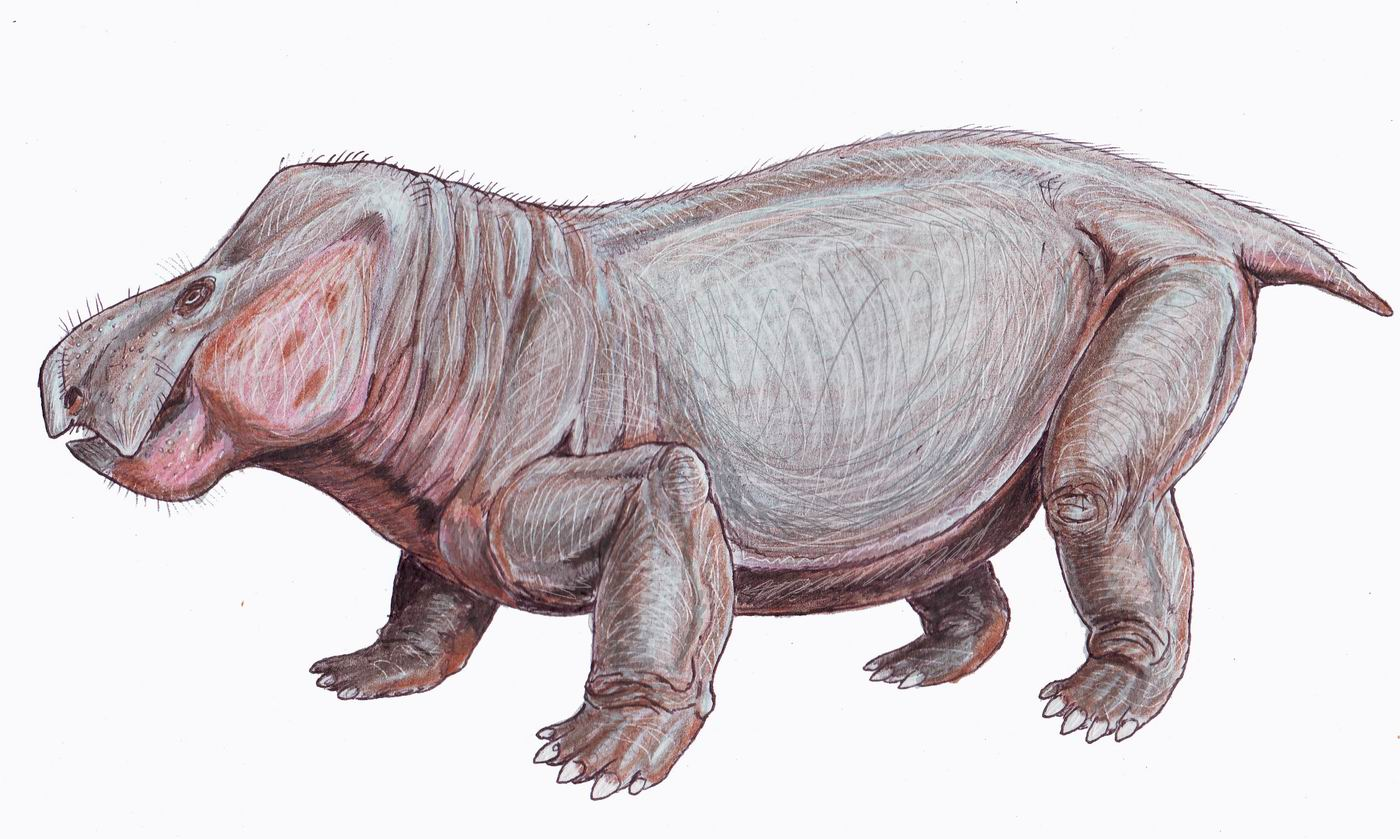
- Restoration of Wadiasaurus indicus

Scientific classification
- Kingdom: Animalia
- Phylum: Chordata
- Clade: Synapsida
- Clade: Therapsida
- Clade: †Anomodontia
- Clade: †Dicynodontia
- Family: †Kannemeyeriidae; Chowdhury, 1970
- Genus: †Wadiasaurus; Chowdhury, 1970

Type species
- †Wadiasaurus indicus Chowdhury, 1970

= Wadiasaurus =

Wadiasaurus Temporal range: Middle Triassic 247.2–242 Ma

Extinct genus of dicynodonts

Wadiasaurus ("Wadia" is in honour of the Professor D. N. Wadia and "sauros" means lizard) is an extinct genus of dicynodont from the family Kannemeyeriidae, that lived in herds from the early to Middle Triassic. Substantial fossorial evidence of W. indicus was recovered from Yerrapalli Formation of the Pranhita-Godavari valley, India, and it is so far the only Kannemeyeriid known for certain from India. The Kannemeyeriiformes underwent a significant diversification during the middle Triassic, with roughly 40 known species distributed worldwide. All Kannemeyeriiformes were medium to large bodied, graviportal herbivores with relatively erect posture and gait. Wadiasaurus indicus is currently the only known species of Wadiasaurus.

== Discovery ==
Wadiasaurus indicus is represented by a collection of well-preserved fossil material recovered from the Yerrapalli formation in India. In a single bone bed, at least 700 cranial and postcranial elements amounting to more than 23 monotypic individuals of varying age were excavated. A taphonomic study of the bone assemblage reveals that a herd of Wadiasaurus, including some juveniles and young animals, were trapped in the soft muds of a floodplain and buried in a small area. The bones were disarticulated and dissociated, which indicates some form of post mortem disturbance, though there was no evidence of any transportation from a great distance (no sign of rolling, abrasion, or maceration). The delicate elements of the skull and iliac elements were preserved, inferring small-scale transportation, likely from weathering of the surrounding region.

== Description ==
Size of Wadiasaurus indicus compared to a human.

=== Skull ===
The skull is moderately large with a length of 400mm and triangular. The skull roof is comparatively narrow and flat but the snout is curved downward anteriorly and descends laterally (almost vertically) to form the maxillary flanges. The external naris is laterally directed and is moderately large. The orbit is elliptical and relatively large, looking mainly outward and slightly forward; it is situated laterally near the mid-length of the skull. The interorbital region is not broad (about 28% of the skull length), and the temporal fenestra is long and narrow. The parietal is high and narrow anteriorly but widens posteriorly almost up to the occipital margin. In the palate the premaxilla is long and narrow; the interpterygoid vacuity (open space on the palate) is wide. The occiput faces sharply downward and backward, thus making an acute angle with the rest of the skull, and is characterized by a broad wing-like squamosal.

=== Pectoral girdle and forelimb ===
==== Scapula ====
The scapular blade of Wadiasaurus is long, narrow, and slender, and with the coracoid plate it form an outward, open-notched glenoid fossa that faces caudolaterally with sharply defined upper and lower lips. The scapular side of the glenoid fossa is slightly concave whereas the coracoid side is slightly convex. Although the pro-coracoid is not preserved in Wadiasaurus, it is small and subtriangular in Lystrosaurus, a related dicynodont. The coracoid's lateral surface in Wadiasaurus is concave and its ventral margin has an unfinished and wavy appearance that suggests a cartilaginous extension of the coracoid to the interclavicle. The ventro-lateral surface of the coracoid was the site of attachment of the muscles M. coracobrachialis and M. biceps. Medially, the cranial edge of the coracoid was the site of M. triceps attachment.

==== Humerus, radius, ulnus, and manus ====
In the humerus, there is a large entepicondylar foramen that obliquely pierces the ventral surface of the humeral shaft, and it has a large, raised, asymmetric area on the ventral humeral surface for articulation with the ulna and radius. A triangular, raised trochlea continues on the dorsal surface which suggests greater ulnar extension compared to related dicynodonts.

The radius is stout and rod-like with expanded proximal and distal ends and a narrow midshaft region. The ulna of Wadiasaurus is also stout but craniocaudally compressed. It is characterized by a prominent wedge-shaped olecranon process, whose cranial face has the site of insertion of M. triceps. In Wadiasaurus, the olecranon is completely ossified and fused with the ulna in contrast to that of Stahleckeriaand, which are other Triassic dicynodonts, where the olecranon process remained as a separate ossified entity from the ulna.

The manus is broad, robust, and short with blunt and stout claws, and exhibits a phalangeal formula of 2-3-3-3-3. The phalanges of Wadiasaurus are short and broad compared with those of Diictodon. The terminal phalanx is a short but broad claw with a ventral curvature and a boss on its plantar side.

=== Pelvic girdle and hindlimb ===
==== Ilium, pubis, and ischium ====
The iliac blade of Wadiasaurus is wide, subtriangular and concave laterally. The dorsal edge of the iliac blade is highly convex, smooth, and asymmetric, and its caudal end is almost at a 45-degree angle to the horizontal plane. The ilium has a short, constricted neck above the acetabulum. The medial iliac surface has connection points for the expanded distal ends of the sacral ribs. At least five facets are distinctly visible in Wadiasaurus.

The small, robust and twisted pubis of Wadiasaurus is similar to that of Stahleckeria. Its craniolateral end has an unfinished, roughened appearance suggesting possible attachment for abdominal fascia or cartilage. Caudally the pubis meets the ischium in a straight suture, which is interrupted dorsally by a median, large, circular obturator foramen. The acetabulum, formed by the ilium and the pubo-ischiadic plate, is deep, large, concave, subcircular, and obliquely elongated.

In Wadiasaurus, the ischium can be subdivided into lateral and medial flanges that meet at roughly 60 degrees. Muscle restoration on the pelvic girdle and hindlimb follows the pattern inferred for other dicynodonts such as Diictodon.

==== Tibia, fibula, and pedals ====
The tibia is rod-like and robust with expanded proximal and distal ends and a prominent cnemial crest. Although the mid shaft region is elliptical in cross-section, the tibia of Wadiasaurus is more flattened than other dicynodonts. The proximal tibial surface for articulation with the femur was composed of two oval and concave sulci separated by a low ridge, whereas the distal surface was circular and convex for articulation with the astragalus. A shallow depression on the cranio-proximal edge of the cnemial crest was the site of insertion of the muscles extensor ilio-tibialis and femoro-tibialis, whereas M. pubo-ischio-tibialis was probably attaching on the proximo-caudal surface of the tibia, as suggested by prominent muscle scars and a shallow depression. The site of origin of M. tibialis anterior was a flat area on the cranial surface of the tibia.

Conversely, the fibula is slender, flattened craniocaudally and has an expanded distal end in comparison with the proximal end. As in the case of the femur and tibia, the midshaft region is more flattened in Wadiasaurus compared to other dicynodonts.

The pedal formula is 2-3-3-3-3, and the pedal phalanges are short and broad; they are similar in morphology to the manual phalanges. The terminal phalanges become short, blunt claws with plantar bosses for the attachment of flexor muscles.

=== Vertebral column ===
There were likely 25 presacral vertebrae in Wadiasaurus, of which roughly seven were cervicals, 18 dorsals, and about five sacral vertebrae, with an indeterminate number of caudal vertebrae. The cervicals had very long neural spines, which supported strong muscle attachment.

The cervical prezygapophyses of the two dicynodonts are slightly concave and form an angle of ~10–20 degrees to the horizontal plane. In contrast, the dorsal prezygapohyses are concave, dish-like, and form an angle of ~ 50–60 degrees to the horizontal. The angle increases towards the sacrum, suggesting that lateral undulation became restricted towards the sacrum. This differs from the condition seen in the Permian digging dicynodonts such as Diictodon and Cistecephalus, which have wide, flat zygapophyses of the presacral vertebrae, allowing them to undulate laterally.

=== Caudal region ===
The shape of the midcaudal centra suggests an abrupt downturning of the tail; the posterior faces of two or three of the centra slope posterior-ventrally at a level much below the anterior faces, and the neural canal also slopes down posteriorly, with small ribs also attached to the centra. Facets for the reception of the chevron bones are present on the posterior faces. The caudal vertebrae suggest that Wadiasaurus had a cylindrically thick but short tail which dropped down and terminated at a point.

=== Functional anatomy ===
The long cervical neural spines of Wadiasaurus provided extensive anchorage for the nuchal ligament and neck muscles as in extant hoofed mammals, such as horses. These muscles were used in supporting, elevating, and moving the large head, which constituted about 20 per cent of the total body length. The angle of the scapular blade and curvature of the dorsal ribs suggest that Wadisaurus had a barrel-like body shape. Wadiasaurus exhibits a more elevated pelvic girdle than pectoral girdle, with overall high elevation from the ground, as inferred by postcranial evidence.

== Paleobiology ==
=== Sociality ===
==== Herd behavior ====
From the number of left femora (23) found in the bone assemblage present at the excavation site in the Yerrapalli formation, there were conclusively at least 23 individuals of Wadiasaurus forming a group, and from bone measurements, it appears that 30% of the individuals within this group were juveniles or young members.

The occurrence of such a large number of both of juvenile and adult individuals of a single species in such a small area raises the possibility of the existence of a herd of animals which were buried in the locality under one catastrophic event. Herding behavior of dicynodonts has already been examined, though there are no definite references to the herding behavior of Triassic dicynodonts except in Placerias and Dinodontosaurus. It is possible that herding was quite common among them. Herding behavior is also indicated by the occurrence of the Chinese Parakannemeyeria brevirostris, when nine young individuals were found in a single locality. More noticeably, modern herbivores also live in herds.

==== Sexual dimorphism ====
Previous excavations of Wadiasaurus have yielded solitary specimens, which had comparatively thicker snout regions and a prominent median ridge on the ventral side of the lower jaw. The presence of large nasal bosses in Aulacephalodon was considered to be sexually dimorphic for mate recognition and/or agnostic display, so the thickened bones of Wadiasaurus might be an explanation for expression of sexual dimorphism. Bandyopadhyay described a tusked specimen of Wadiasaurus indicus (ISI R176), previously known from the tuskless holotype (ISI R38), arguing that these specimens represent the male and female of the species (respectively). In further support of this, some maxillae collected from the group in the Yerrapalli formation had no traces of a tooth bud, which suggests that the tusk of Wadiasaurus was characteristic of males and connected to display and mate recognition.

Considering all the above views as well as field observations, especially on the present monotypic association, it is proposed that Wadiasaurus lived in herds composed of females and perhaps juveniles, whereas the adult male members remained isolated and joined the herds only during the mating seasons.

=== Ontogeny ===
The bone microstructure suggests three distinct ontogenetic stages; the presence of highly vascularized fibrolamellar bone and absence of growth marks in the smaller skeletal elements examined (<30% adult size) suggest sustained rapid growth during the juvenile stage, which was followed by periodic interruptions in growth as suggested by the presence of multiple growth marks in the young adult stage when up to 60% of adult size was attained. Concurrently, the adult stage was marked by the onset of endosteal bone deposition. During the adult stage, growth slowed down considerably as evidenced by the presence of peripheral parallel fibered bone, decrease in vascularity towards the periosteal periphery, and more organized arrangement of the osteocyte lacunnae. All of these growth marks suggest a high degree of developmental plasticity in Wadiasaurus, meaning they had the ability to respond to changes in the environment (temperature fluctuations or resource abundance for example), by evoking different developmental/growth timelines. Adverse environmental conditions were a likely contributing factor to the bone growth patterns seen, since in the Triassic period, the Pranhita-Godavari basin had a hot, semi-arid climate with strongly seasonal rainfall. This ability to stop growth and development during adverse environmental conditions has also been observed in other non-mammalian therapsids, and is considered a plesiomorphic condition for the mammalian lineage.

== Classification ==
In the current topology, Kannemeyeriidae is paraphyletic, with an array of Kannemeyeria-grade taxa leading up to Stahleckeriidae, but a notable recent change is the removal of Wadiasaurus from Stahleckeriidae into Kannemeyeriidae. A comparative study of Wadiasaurus and other kannemeyeriid genera indicates that it might have been most closely related to Kannemeyeria erithrea.

The broad diagnostic features of the Kannemeyeriidae family are: (i) large dicynodonts; (ii) moderately elongated snout with a strong median ridge in some genera; (iii) anteriorly placed jaw articulation; (iv) oblique occiput; and (v) the length of the palate is less than 90% of the dorsal length of the skull. These features specifically place Wadiasaurus in the family Kannemeyeriidae since the snout is about 44% of the skull length (it should not exceed 47% of the skull length); the snout is elongated and tapers anteriorly but does not end in a point as in Kannemeyeria, and of the postcranial characters, the scapula is tall and narrow with an anteriorly directed acromion, and there is a separately ossified olecranon process on the ulna. Both cranial and postcranial features seem to justify the inclusion of Wadiasaurus as a definite member of the family Kannemeyeriidae.

The comparative study of the diagnostic characters of different kannemeyeriid genera with Wadiasaurus clearly distinguishes it as its own genus. However, it does not indicate any particular relationship between Wadiasaurus and any other genus. However, Wadiasaurus does show some resemblances to one or two genera; for example, the snout regions of K. erithrea, Uralokannemeyeria, and Wadiasaurus are tapering and blunt.

In addition, the RBT (a proxy for the thickness of bone) of the forelimb bones of Wadiasaurus (except femur) is comparable with that of the extant megaherbivores such as Ceratotherium, though the femoral thickness is much higher in the latter. The calculated $K_\text{c}$-values (fracture toughness) of the adult limb bones (ranging between 0.3 and 0.6) show that Wadiasaurus is comparable with land animals, where the limb bones were selected for high weight loads, and were able to absorb a certain amount of stress without breaking the bone. Hence, bone cortical thickness and optimal $K_\text{c}$-values suggest that Wadiasaurus may be considered as a generalized terrestrial, herbivorous animal, which is further supported by its skeletal design.

Below is a cladogram from Szczygielski & Sulej (2023):

- Kannemeyeriiformes
  - Shansiodontidae
    - Rhinodicynodon
    - - Tetragonias
      - - Shansiodon
        - Vinceria
  - - Dinodontosaurus
    - - "Kannemeyeriidae"
        - Dolichuranus
        - - - - Acratophorus
              - - Rabidosaurus
                - Wadiasaurus
            - - Sinokannemeyeria
              - - Parakannemeyeria
                - Xiyukannemeyeria
          - - Rhadiodromus
            - - Shaanbeikannemeyeria
              - - Kannemeyeria
                - - Rechnisaurus
                  - Uralokannemeyeria
      - - Angonisaurus
        - - Woznikella
          - Stahleckeriidae

== See also ==
- List of therapsids
- Dicynodonts
- Kannemeyeria
- Stahleckeriidae
- Yerrapalli Formation
