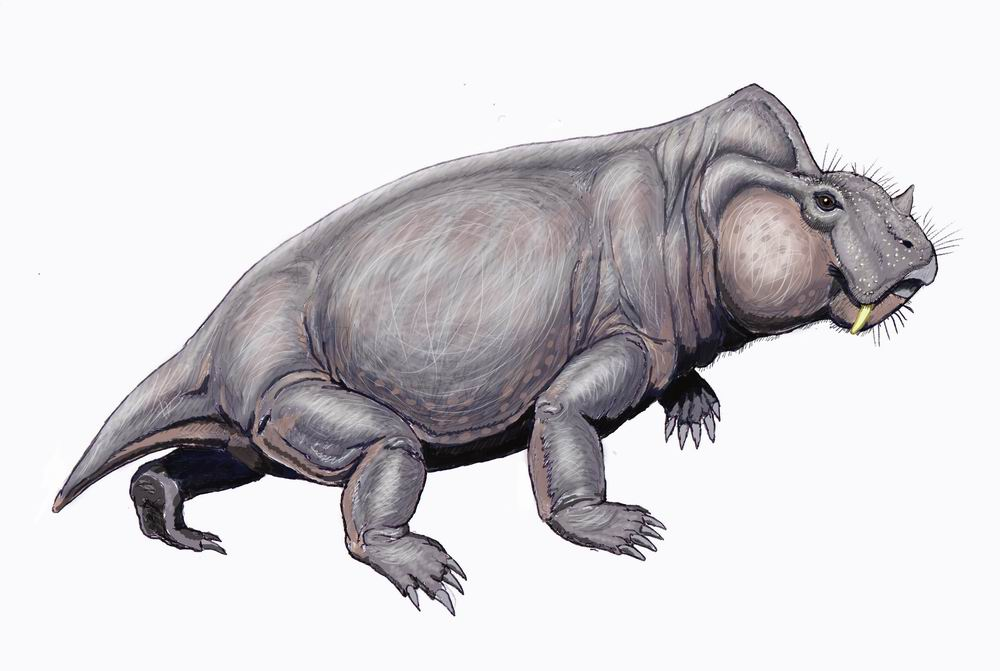

Scientific classification
- Kingdom: Animalia
- Phylum: Chordata
- Clade: Synapsida
- Clade: Therapsida
- Clade: †Anomodontia
- Clade: †Dicynodontia
- Family: †Kannemeyeriidae
- Genus: †Rabidosaurus; Kalandadze, 1970

Type species
- Rabidosaurus cristatus Kalandadze, 1970

= Rabidosaurus =

Rabidosaurus Temporal range: Anisian ~247–242 Ma

Extinct genus of dicynodonts

Rabidosaurus (from the Latin "rabidus", meaning "violent, furious", and the Greek "sauros/σαυρος", meaning "lizard") is an extinct genus of medium-sized herbivorous dicynodont of the family Kannemeyeriidae from the Middle Triassic (Anisian) Donguz Formation in southwestern Russia. The genus is monotypic, and contains only the species Rabidosaurus cristatus.

== Description ==
The holotype of Rabidosaurus (PIN No. 952/100) is a mostly complete skull missing parts of the lower jaws; an additional two fragmentary skulls are attributed to the taxon (PIN 2866/8 and 2866/9, respectively), but have not been described in detail. The skull is estimated to have been approximately 57cm in length when the animal was alive, and is described as tall, narrow, and wedge-shaped. One of the most noteworthy features of Rabidosaurus' skull is the tall, prominent crest formed mainly by the parietal bones, offset from the frontal bone at an angle of approximately 120°. The posteromedial process of the frontal bones features a shallow depression with a steep wall formed by a small, oval preparietal. Similar to the majority of other dicynodonts, Rabidosaurus has a large parietal foramen, which would have housed a photoreceptive parietal eye in life. The occipital condyle is also described as being large. The premaxillary and nasal bones are thickened and flat, which has been interpreted as evidence for a small, keratinous nasal horn in some palaeoartistic reconstructions (see page image). Thickening is also present on the upper edge of the orbits, on the postorbital, the posterolateral edge of the jaw, and on the prefrontal bone. The pterygoid lightly contacts the premaxilla. The septomaxilla is large and rectangular, with a smooth outer surface; this smooth texture extends to the orbit and lacrimal bone. The orbits are relatively large and laterally-placed, suggesting a wide field of vision. The right canine tusk of the holotype was broken when the animal was alive; the tusks are described as long, but not particularly thick. The left tusk also shows signs of wear. Kalandadze notes a resemblance between Rabidosaurus and the related dicynodonts Rhadiodromus, Parakannemeyeria, and Sinokannemeyeria.

== Palaeoecology ==
The Donguz Formation outcrops on the bank of the Donguz River in Orenburg Oblast, and likely represented a lacustrine–deltaic plain during the Middle Triassic. It preserves a number of tetrapod and fish fossils in addition to Rabidosaurus. Archosaurs include Dongusuchus, Jushatyria, and the probable nomen dubium Donguisia. Non-archosaur archisauriformes are also present, including Sarmatosuchus, Vjushkovisaurus, Dorosuchus, and the erythrosuchids Uralosaurus and Garjainia. In addition to Rabidosaurus, the ecosystem supported a great diversity of dicynodonts, such as Calleonasus, Elatosaurus, Rhadiodromus, Rhinodicynodon, and Uralokannemeyeria. Other non-mammalian therapsids include the cynodont Scalenodon, and the therocephalians Dongusaurus, Nothogomphodon, and Antecosuchus. There was an abundance of temnospondyls, including at least three species of Eryosuchus, as well as two species of Plagiorophus, and the genera Plagioscutum, Plagiosternum, and Bukobaja. The only procolophonid described from the locality is Kapes. At least three species of the lungfish Ceratodus have been identified in the formation, as well as an unnamed putative elasmobranch.

== Phylogeny ==
Below is a cladogram from Szczygielski & Sulej (2023):

- Kannemeyeriiformes
  - Shansiodontidae
    - Rhinodicynodon
    - - Tetragonias
      - - Shansiodon
        - Vinceria
  - - Dinodontosaurus
    - - "Kannemeyeriidae"
        - Dolichuranus
        - - - - Acratophorus
              - - Rabidosaurus
                - Wadiasaurus
            - - Sinokannemeyeria
              - - Parakannemeyeria
                - Xiyukannemeyeria
          - - Rhadiodromus
            - - Shaanbeikannemeyeria
              - - Kannemeyeria
                - - Rechnisaurus
                  - Uralokannemeyeria
      - - Angonisaurus
        - - Woznikella
          - Stahleckeriidae

== See also ==
- List of therapsids
