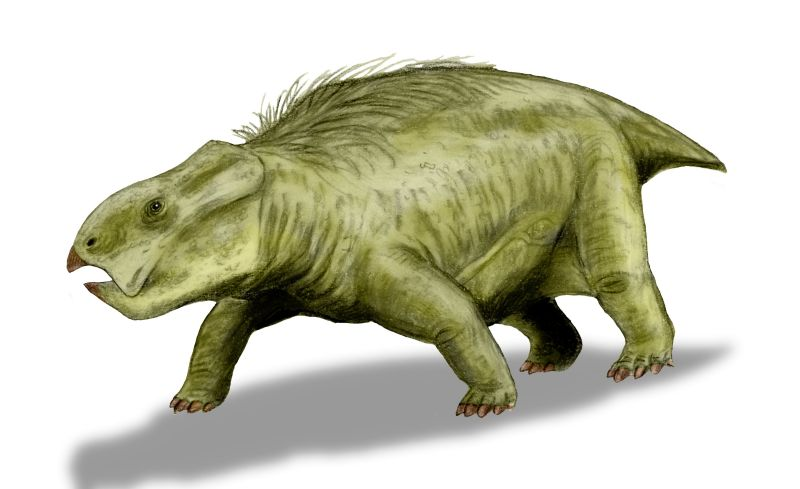
- Life restoration of Dolichuranus primaevus

Scientific classification
- Domain: Eukaryota
- Kingdom: Animalia
- Phylum: Chordata
- Clade: Synapsida
- Clade: Therapsida
- Suborder: †Anomodontia
- Clade: †Dicynodontia
- Clade: †Kannemeyeriiformes
- Genus: †Dolichuranus; Keyser, 1973

Species
- D. primaevus

= Dolichuranus =

Dolichuranus Temporal range: Anisian ~247–242 Ma

Extinct genus of dicynodonts

Dolichuranus is an extinct genus of dicynodont therapsids from the Middle Triassic Omingonde Formation of Namibia and the Ntawere Formation of Zambia.

== Phylogeny ==
Dolichuranus in a cladogram after Szczygielski & Sulej (2023):

- Kannemeyeriiformes
  - Shansiodontidae
    - Rhinodicynodon
    - - Tetragonias
      - - Shansiodon
        - Vinceria
  - - Dinodontosaurus
    - - "Kannemeyeriidae"
        - Dolichuranus
        - - - - Acratophorus
              - - Rabidosaurus
                - Wadiasaurus
            - - Sinokannemeyeria
              - - Parakannemeyeria
                - Xiyukannemeyeria
          - - Rhadiodromus
            - - Shaanbeikannemeyeria
              - - Kannemeyeria
                - - Rechnisaurus
                  - Uralokannemeyeria
      - - Angonisaurus
        - - Woznikella
          - Stahleckeriidae

== See also ==
- List of therapsids
