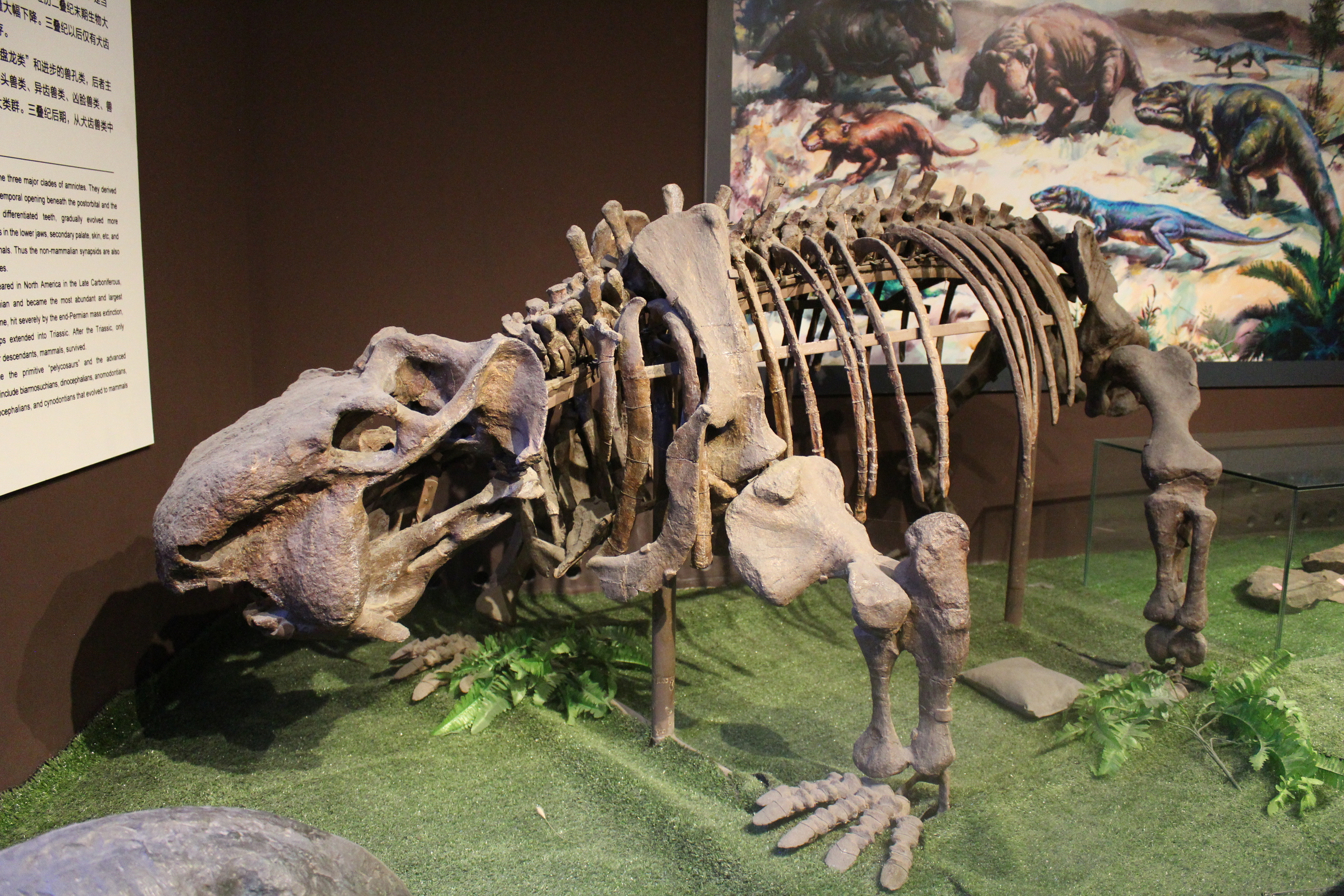
- Mounted skeleton, Paleozoological Museum of China

Scientific classification
- Kingdom: Animalia
- Phylum: Chordata
- Clade: Synapsida
- Clade: Therapsida
- Clade: †Anomodontia
- Clade: †Dicynodontia
- Clade: †Kannemeyeriiformes
- Genus: †Sinokannemeyeria; Young, 1937

Type species
- †Sinokannemeyeria pearsoni Young, 1937

Species
- †S. baidaoyuensis Liu, 2015; †S. pearsoni Young, 1937; †S. sanchuanheensis Cheng, 1980; †S. yingchiaoensis Sun, 1963

= Sinokannemeyeria =

Sinokannemeyeria Temporal range: Middle Triassic, 247.2–242 Ma

Extinct genus of dicynodonts

Sinokannemeyeria is a genus of kannemeyeriiform dicynodont that lived during the Anisian age of Middle Triassic period in what is now Shanxi, China.

== Description ==
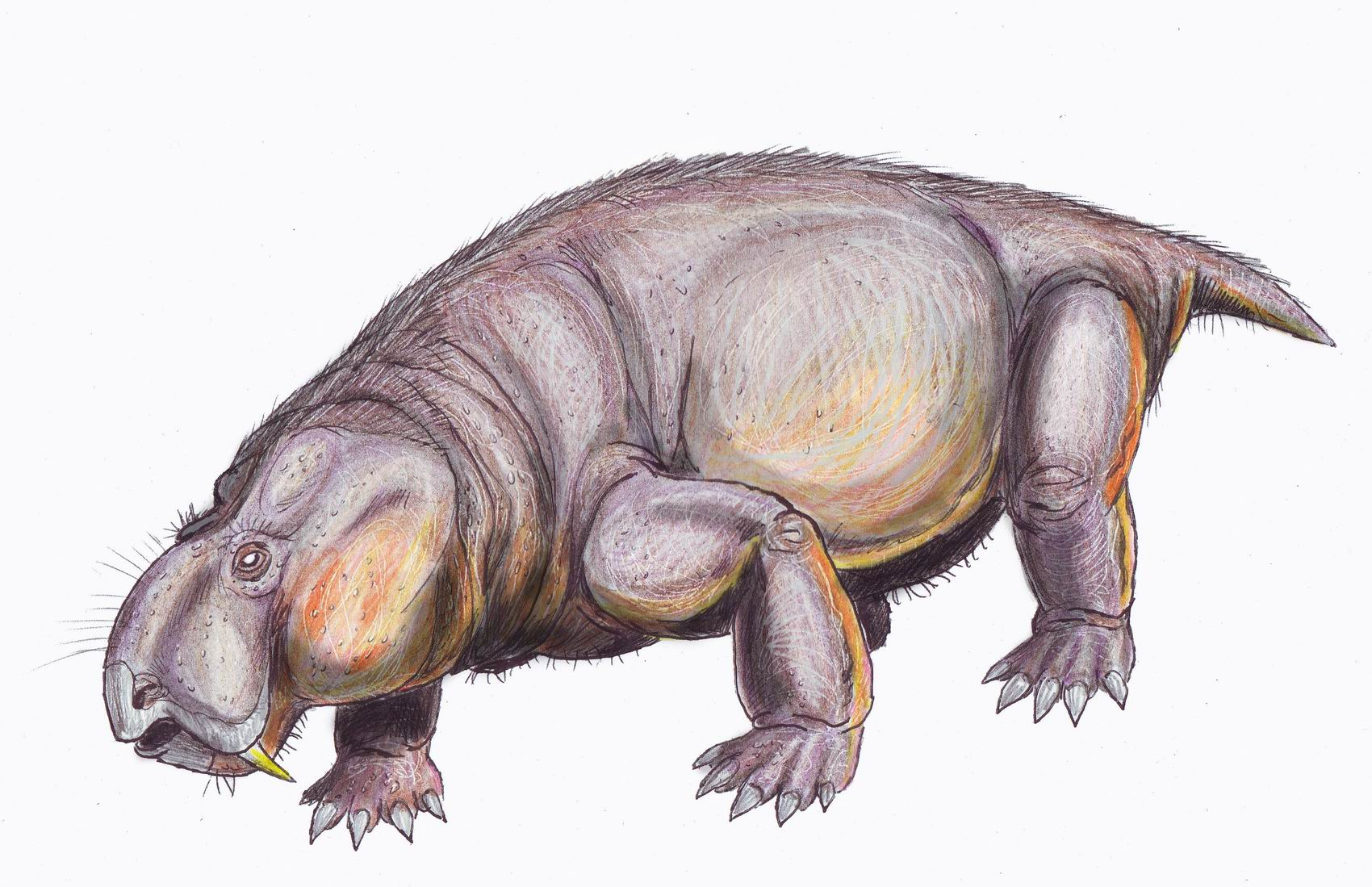
Restoration of Sinokannemeyeria

Sinokannemeyeria was about 1.8 metres (5.9 ft) in length and 100 kilograms (220 lb) in weight. It had relatively short, stumpy legs which were held slightly sprawling gait to the sides of its body. The limb girdles were formed into large, heavy plates of bone to support the weight of the wide, heavily built body. Sinokannemeyeria was probably not a fast or agile animal.

The front of the jaw had a small horn-covered beak, and there were two small tusks growing from bulbous projections on the upper jaw. These tusks could have been used to dig up roots. Compared to Kannemeyeria, it had broader snout, smaller temporal fenestrae and lower temporal crests. Sinokannemeyeria may had rather indiscriminately seized and torn vegetation in contrast to the more selective cropping of Kannemeyeria.

== Classification ==
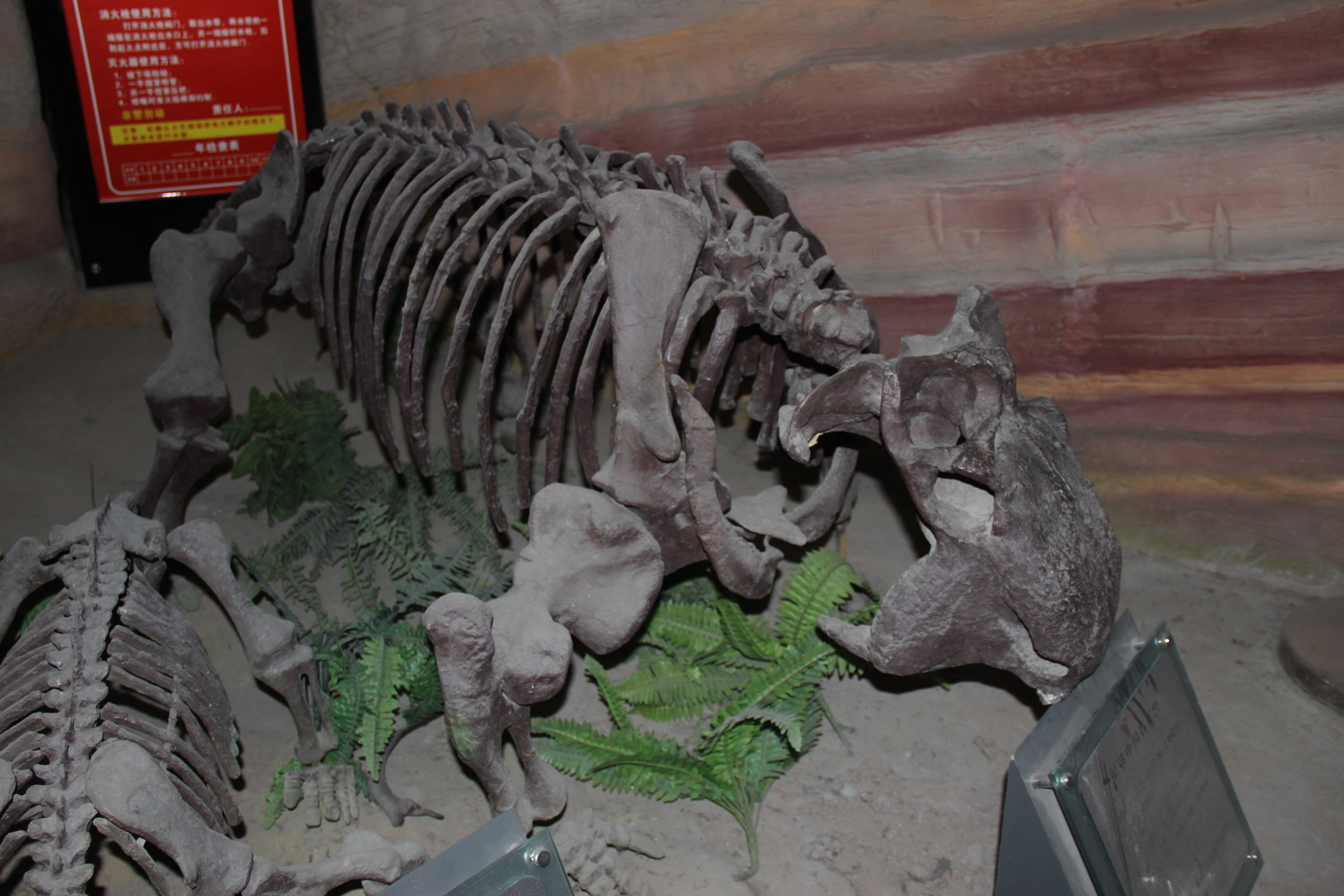
Skeletal mount with a juvenile in the bottom left

Below is a cladogram from Kammerer et al. (2013):

- Kannemeyeriiformes
  - Angonisaurus
  - - Shansiodontidae
      - - Tetragonias
        - Vinceria
      - - Shansiodon
        - Rhinodicynodon
    - - Dinodontosaurus
      - - - Shaanbeikannemeyeria
          - - Kannemeyeria simocephalus
            - Kannemeyeria lophorhinus
        - - - Parakannemeyeria
            - Xiyukannemeyeria
          - - - Dolichuranus
              - - Rechnisaurus
                - Uralokannemeyeria
            - - Rhadiodromus
              - - Sinokannemeyeria
                - - - Rabidosaurus
                    - Wadiasaurus
                  - Stahleckeriidae
                    - Placeriinae
                      - Zambiasaurus
                      - - Placerias
                        - Moghreberia
                    - Stahleckeriinae
                      - Stahleckeria
                      - - - Eubrachiosaurus
                          - Sangusaurus
                        - - Jachaleria
                          - Ischigualastia

== See also ==
- List of therapsids
