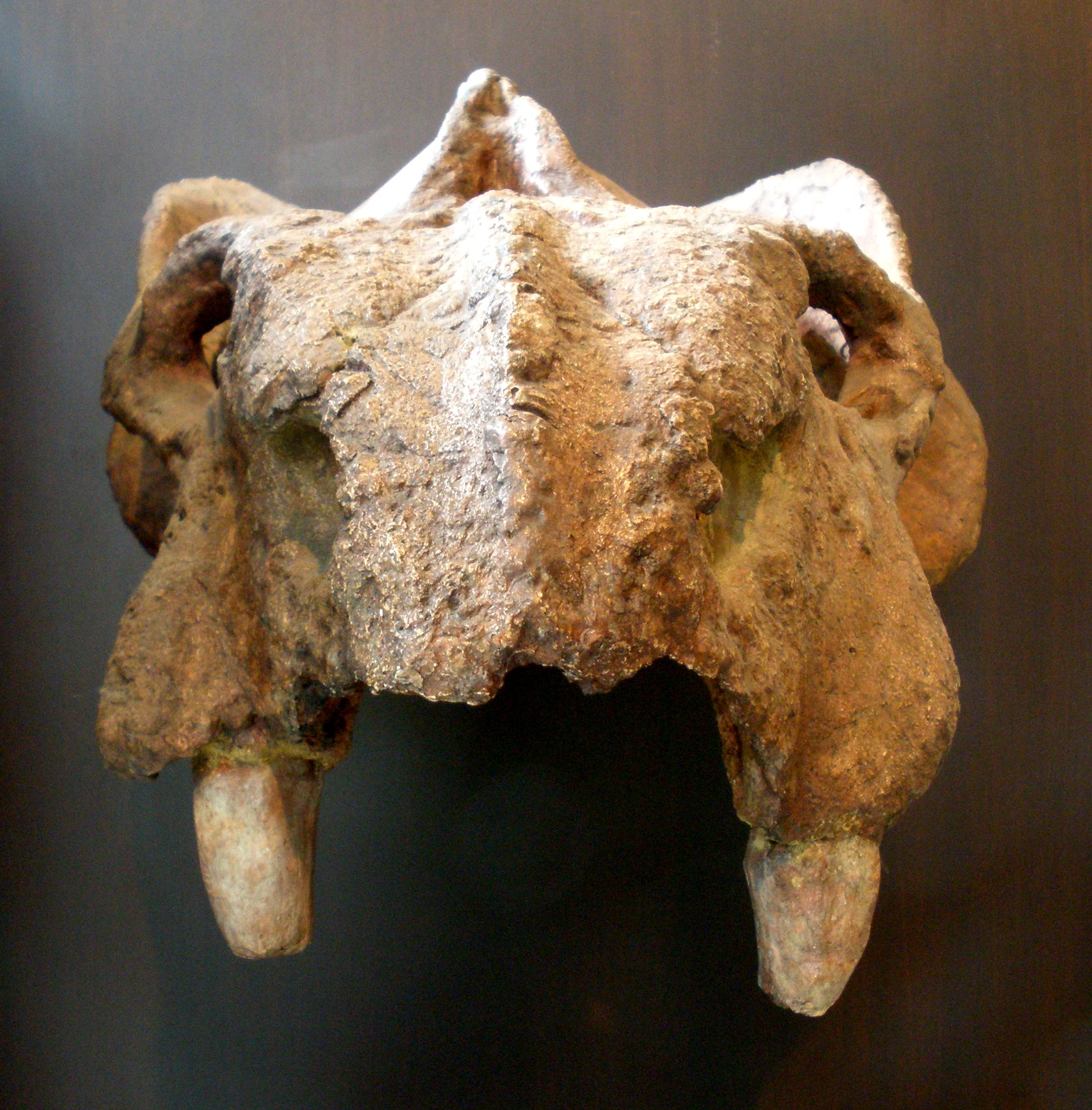
- Skull of Kannemeyeria simocephalus

Scientific classification
- Kingdom: Animalia
- Phylum: Chordata
- Clade: Synapsida
- Clade: Therapsida
- Clade: †Anomodontia
- Clade: †Dicynodontia
- Family: †Kannemeyeriidae
- Genus: †Kannemeyeria; Seeley, 1908

Type species
- †Kannemeyeria proboscoides Seeley, 1908 (Junior synonym of K. simocephalus)

Species
- K. aganosteus Kammerer & Ordoñez, 2021; K. lophorhinus Renaut et al., 2003; K. simocephalus (Weithofer, 1888)

Synonyms
- Genus synonymy: Proplacerias Cruickshank, 1970; ?Ptychocynodon Seeley, 1904 [nomen nudum?]; Sagecephalus Jaekel, 1911; Shaanbeikannemeyeria? Cheng, 1980; Uralokannemeyeria? Danilov, 1971; Species synonymy: Synonyms of K. simocephalus: Dicynodon latifrons Broom, 1889; Kannemeyeria erithrea Haughton, 1915; K. proboscoides Seeley, 1909; K. wilsoni Cruickshank, 1970; Proplacerias vanhoepeni (Camp, 1956); ?Ptychocynodon pentangulatus Seeley, 1904 [nomen nudum?]; Sagecephalus pachyrhynchus Jaekel, 1911

= Kannemeyeria =

Kannemeyeria Temporal range: Anisian ~247–242 Ma

Extinct genus of dicynodonts

Kannemeyeria is a genus of dicynodont that lived during the Anisian age of Middle Triassic period in what is now Africa and South America. The generic name is given in honor of Daniel Rossouw Kannemeyer, the South African fossil collector who discovered the original specimen. It is one of the first representatives of the family, and hence one of the first large herbivores of the Triassic.

== Description ==
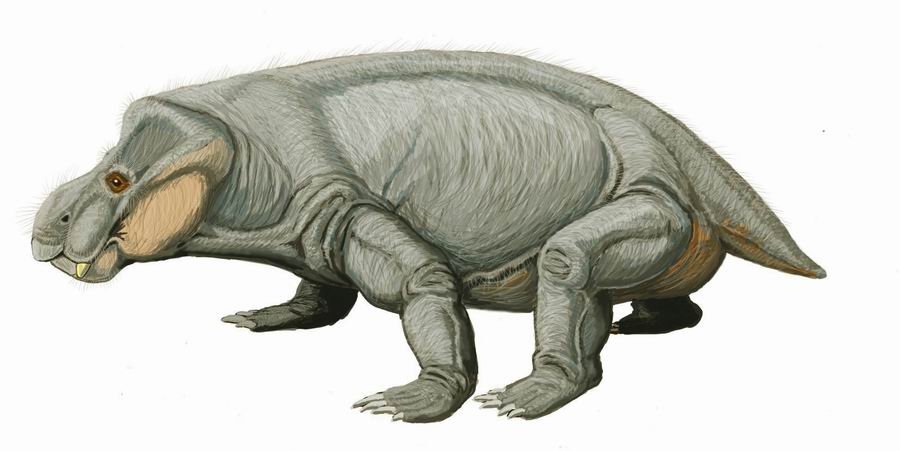
Restoration of Kannemeyeria

Kannemeyeria was about 3 metres (9.8 ft) in length, about the size of an ox. Although it had a large head, it was lightweight due to the size of the eye sockets and nasal cavity. It also had limb girdles which formed massive plates of bone that helped support its heavily built body.

Kannemeyeria was well-adapted to living as a herbivore; it had a powerful beak and strong jaw muscles built for shearing plant material. Kannemeyeria had a massive head with unusually large openings for the eyes, nostrils and jaw muscles. It evidently tore up roots, stripped leaves from the vegetation with its horny beak and ground them up with its toothless jaws.

In a zone of Karoo Supergroup, Kannemeyeria is found alongside large carnivorous archosaur Erythrosuchus.

== Distribution ==
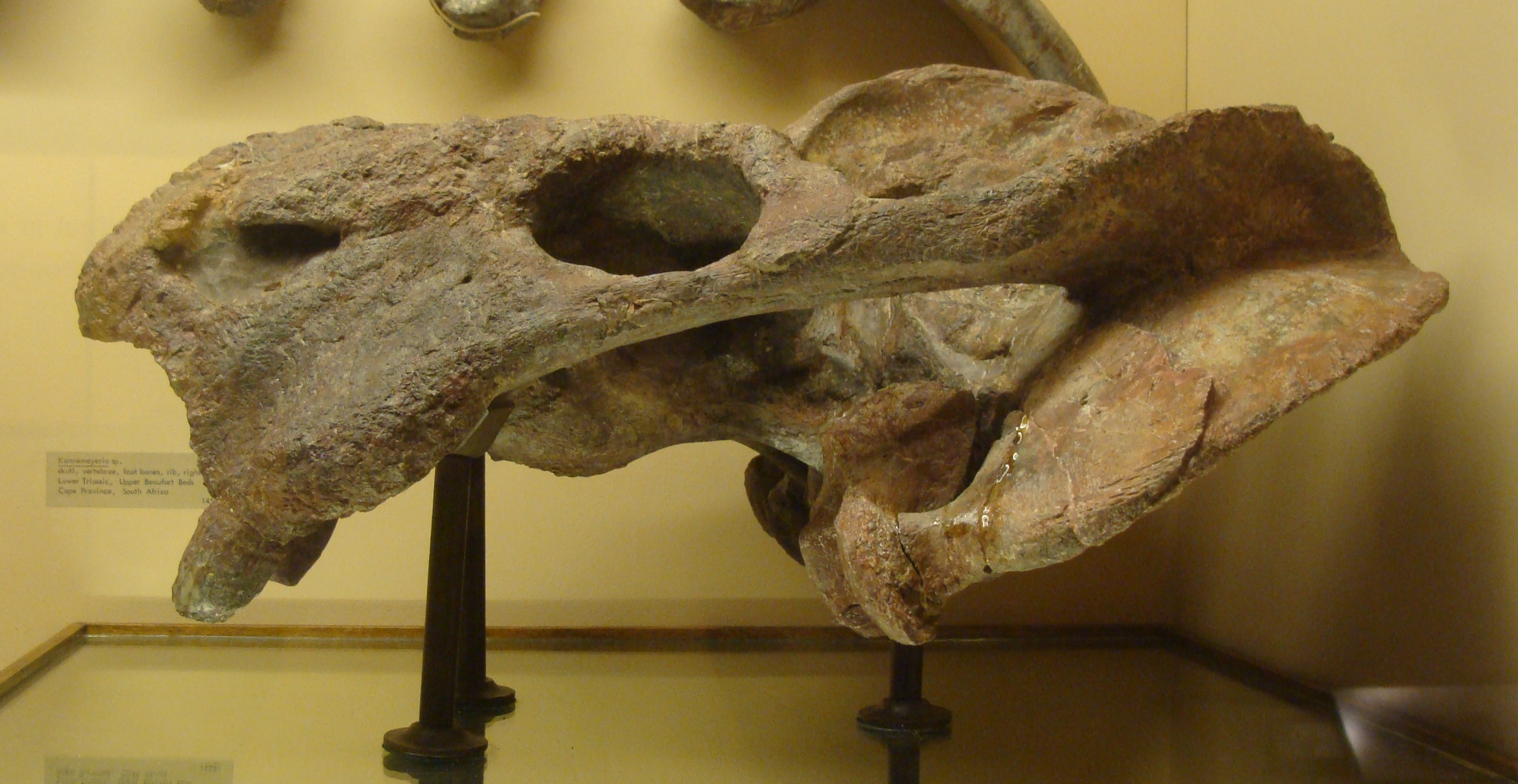
Kannemeyeria skull

Kannemeyeria is known from the Subzone B of Burgersdorp Formation of South Africa, the Ntawere Formation of Zambia, the Omingonde Formation of Namibia, the Lifua member of Manda Formation of Tanzania, and the Quebrada de los Fósiles Formation of Argentina.

== Classification ==
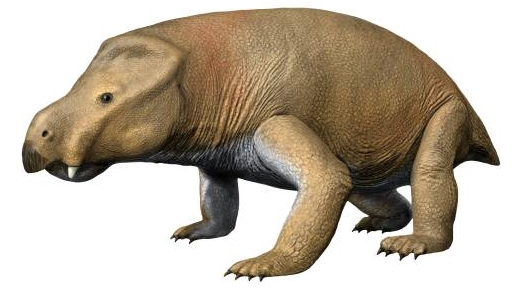
Life reconstruction of K. simocephalus

Below is a cladogram from Kammerer et al. (2013):

- Kannemeyeriiformes
  - Angonisaurus
  - - Shansiodontidae
      - - Tetragonias
        - Vinceria
      - - Shansiodon
        - Rhinodicynodon
    - - Dinodontosaurus
      - - - Shaanbeikannemeyeria
          - - Kannemeyeria simocephalus
            - Kannemeyeria lophorhinus
        - - - Parakannemeyeria
            - Xiyukannemeyeria
          - - - Dolichuranus
              - - Rechnisaurus
                - Uralokannemeyeria
            - - Rhadiodromus
              - - Sinokannemeyeria
                - - - Rabidosaurus
                    - Wadiasaurus
                  - Stahleckeriidae
                    - Placeriinae
                      - Zambiasaurus
                      - - Placerias
                        - Moghreberia
                    - Stahleckeriinae
                      - Stahleckeria
                      - - - Eubrachiosaurus
                          - Sangusaurus
                        - - Jachaleria
                          - Ischigualastia

== See also ==
- List of therapsids
