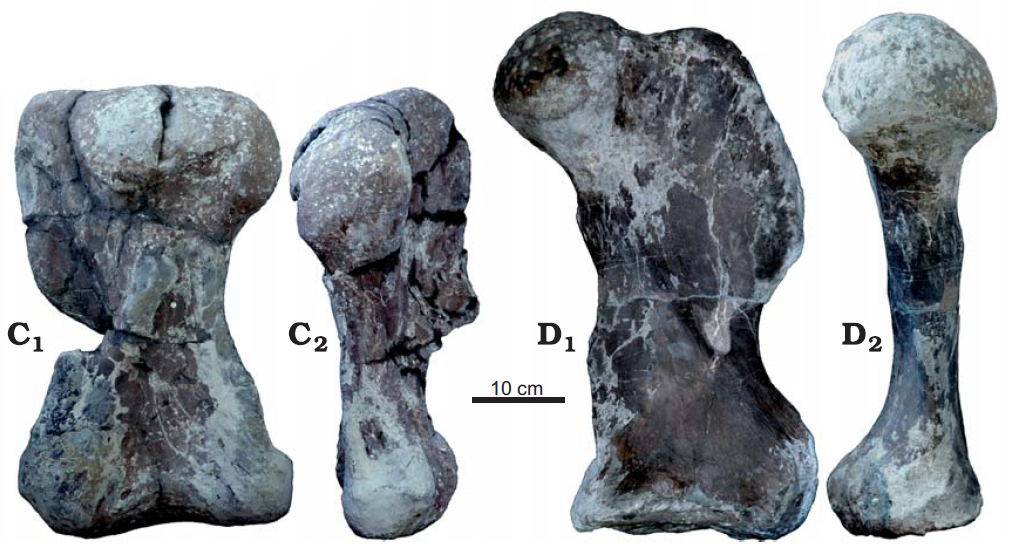
- Left humerus and femur

Scientific classification
- Kingdom: Animalia
- Phylum: Chordata
- Clade: Synapsida
- Clade: Therapsida
- Clade: †Anomodontia
- Clade: †Dicynodontia
- Family: †Stahleckeriidae
- Subfamily: †Placeriinae
- Genus: †Lisowicia; Sulej & Niedźwiedzki, 2019
- Species: †L. bojani

Binomial name
- †Lisowicia bojani Sulej & Niedźwiedzki, 2019

= Lisowicia =

Lisowicia Temporal range: Late Triassic Late Norian to Rhaetian

Genus of giant dicynodont therapsid

Lisowicia is an extinct genus of giant dicynodont synapsid that lived in what is now Poland during the late Norian or earliest Rhaetian age of the Late Triassic Period, about 210–205 million years ago. Lisowicia is the largest known dicynodont, as well as the largest non-mammalian synapsid, reaching about 4.5 metres (15 ft) long, standing up to 2.6 metres (8.5 ft) tall at the hips and weighing around 5–7 metric tons (5.5–7.7 short tons), comparable in size to modern elephants. It was also one of the last dicynodonts, living shortly before their extinction at the end of the Triassic period. Fossils of a giant dicynodont were known from Poland since 2008, but Lisowicia was not named and officially described as a new species until late 2018.

Lisowicia is unique amongst dicynodonts for its erect posture, with all four limbs held upright directly under its body. This is similar to the limbs of living mammals and dinosaurs, but unlike the sprawling and semi-erect postures typical of all other dicynodonts (and indeed all other non-mammalian synapsids), and shares many independently evolved features of its limbs with large mammals. Lisowicia was the largest animal in its environment, and was comparable in size and ecology to the herbivorous "prosauropod" sauropodomorphs, which otherwise occupied the role of large high-browsing herbivores in most Late Triassic ecosystems. Prior to the discovery of Lisowicia, dicynodonts were suggested to have been outcompeted by sauropodomorphs and were incapable of achieving similarly large body sizes. Lisowicia may have evolved its large size in response to the absence of sauropodomorphs in its ecosystem in southern Poland, or alternatively may have acted as a direct competitor to them.

== Description ==
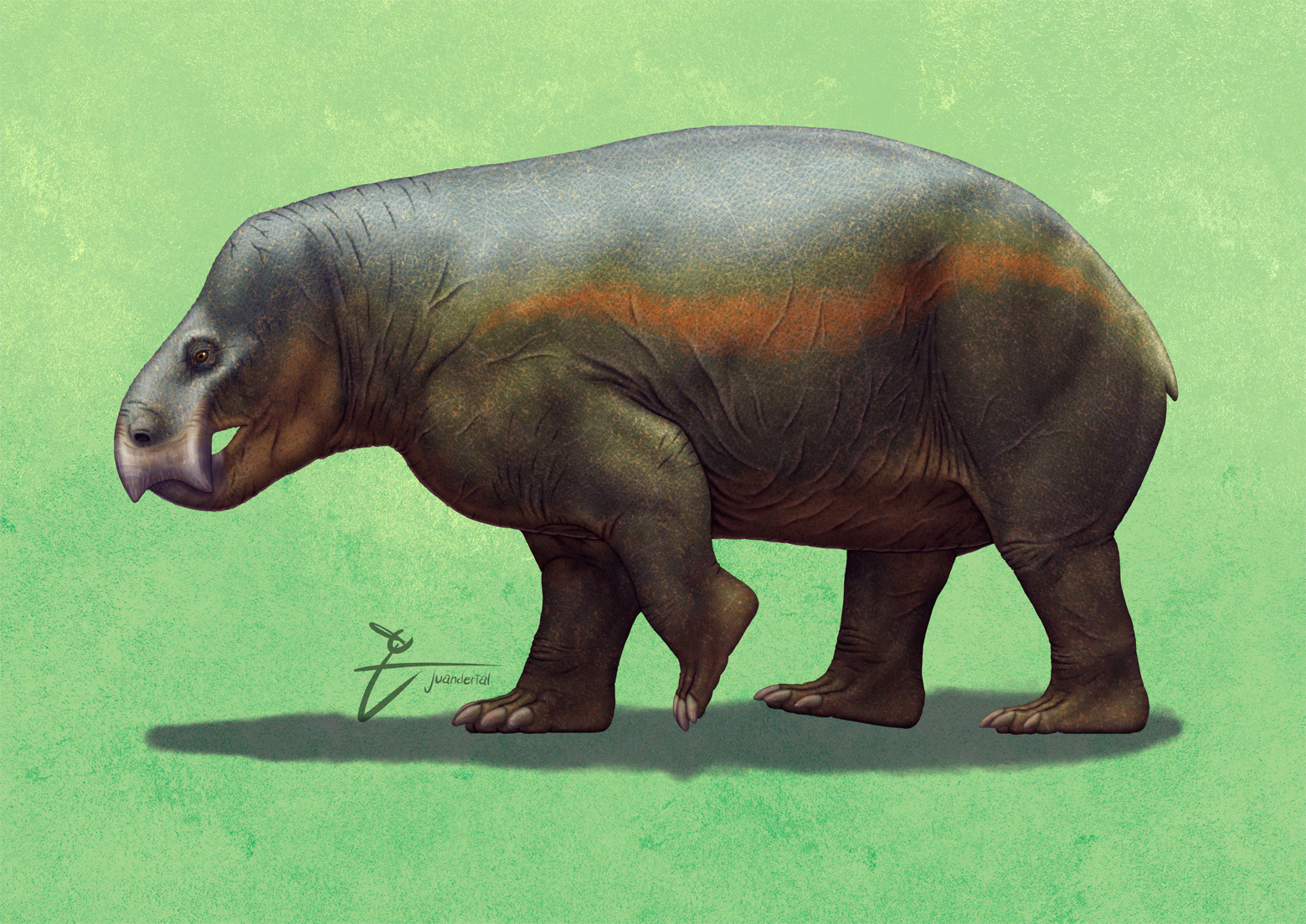
Life restoration

Although very large for a dicynodont, Lisowicia still closely resembles other Triassic stahleckeriids, such as its close relative Placerias from North America. It was a heavily built quadruped with a rotund, barrel-shaped body, a large head with beaked jaws and a short neck, stocky limbs, and a very short tail.

The skull is incomplete and known only from various isolated individual pieces, but they are enough to determine that it had a similar skull to other stahleckeriids. The temporal fenestra were large, and the back of the skull was drawn into a high crest between them, providing extensive jaw muscle attachment at the back of the skull. The snout was relatively elongate like in other stahleckeriids, and had a toothless tortoise-like beak at the front. Like some other Triassic dicynodonts, Lisowicia was completely toothless and lacked even the tusks typical of most dicynodonts. Instead, it had a pair of short and thick triangular projections from the maxillary jaw bone behind the beak called caniniform processes, similar to those of the related Ischigualastia and other stahleckeriids. Likewise, comparing the proportions of the quadrate bone at the back of the skull to those of Ischigualastia suggests that Lisowicia had a broad skull that was roughly 43 centimetres (17 in) wide between each quadrate at the jaw joints.

Its backbone and ribs are typical for dicynodonts, however, the cervical vertebrae of the neck are notable for having unusual hollows excavated into their sides. This is similar to the holes in some dinosaur vertebrae that are associated with a system of air sacs and a bird-like respiratory system. However, unlike dinosaurs Lisowicia lacks openings in its vertebrae (pleurocoels) for air sacs and the interior of the vertebra is solid. This trait is unique to Lisowicia amongst dicynodonts, and its function is unclear. The bones of the pelvis and hind limb are very robust compared to other dicynodonts due to the massive size of the animal (e.g. the largest known femur is 80 centimetres (31 in) long), but are otherwise similar to those of other stahleckeriids. Like other stahleckeriids, the hind legs were also held upright beneath the body.

=== Forelimbs ===
The forelimbs of Lisowicia are very distinctive amongst dicynodonts. Indeed, their construction is unique to not only the group, but to non-mammalian synapsids as a whole and shares features with the limbs of mammals and dinosaurs. The forelimbs of Lisowicia are held completely erect under the body, with an elbow joint that is directed backwards and so only allows the forearm to swing forwards and backwards in a parasagittal gait. This arrangement is found in the hindlimbs of various other large Triassic kannemeyeriiforms, but they all retain sprawling forelimbs with elbows bowed outwards and joints that allow the radius and ulna to rotate during each step in a sprawled posture.

To achieve this posture, the forelimbs of Lisowicia had to undergo several prominent anatomical changes compared to the normal condition in dicynodonts. On the humerus, the shoulder joint and the elbow are parallel to each other, unlike the rotated humerus of sprawling dicynodonts, and so the humerus is held upright beneath the shoulder and directly above the radius and the ulna. The forearm itself is also unusually short compared to other dicynodonts since the elbow is now positioned further down directly below the body and closer to the ground. The musculature of the forelimb has also been rearranged to facilitate its upright posture and gait, now functioning to draw the limb forwards and backwards and losing the ability to rotate the upper arm as it would in a sprawling stride.

=== Size ===
Size comparison of Lisowicia with a human

Although the skeleton is incomplete, the massive size of various elements of its skeleton indicates that Lisowicia was a very large animal, larger than any other dicynodont. From comparing its bones to other dicynodonts, its body length was estimated to be around 4.5 metres (15 ft) long and with a hip height of 2.6 metres (8.5 ft). This upper estimate corresponds to the largest preserved partial humerus, which when complete is estimated to be 61.5 centimetres (24.2 in) long based on the proportions of complete humeri. Its body weight was initially calculated to be approximately 9.3 metric tons (10.3 short tons) from the circumference of its femur and humerus—a proxy for estimating how much weight the limbs needed to support. However, the shafts of these bones are disproportionately robust and thick in Lisowicia, even for its size, and so its body weight was likely overestimated.

Its body weight was later more reliably estimated by modelling its mass from the estimated total volume of its body (volumetric modelling). These estimates varied depending on the girth of its rib cage and the amount of soft tissue modelled around the skeleton, with an overall average weight of 5.9 metric tons (6.5 short tons), and a lowermost estimate with minimal body fat and other tissues at 4.9 metric tons (5.4 short tons) and a maximum of 7 metric tons (7.7 short tons) at its bulkiest. This range is comparable to those of modern African elephants, comfortably making Lisowicia the largest known non-mammalian synapsid and the biggest synapsid prior to the appearance of large mammals in the Eocene (such as the brontotheres). By comparison, the large dinocephalian Tapinocaninus was estimated to weigh only 892 kilograms (1,967 lb) on average using the same methods.

== History of discovery ==
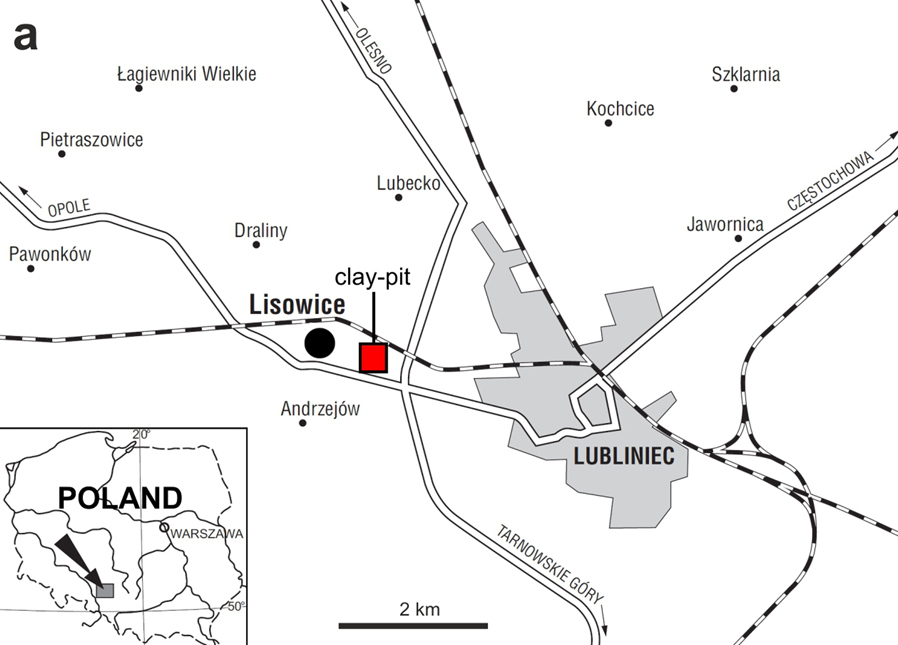
Map of the Lisowice site

Remains of Lisowicia have been discovered in the Lipie Śląskie clay pit in Lisowice, a village in southern Poland near the town of Lubliniec, Silesia. The fossil bearing beds of Lipie Śląskie consist mostly of green mudstones. The age of the Lipie Śląskie clay pit has been difficult to determine, with different biostratigraphic methods of dating providing varying results. The site has typically been dated to the Rhaetian, which would make Lisowicia one of the youngest dicynodonts in the world. However, palaeontologists Grzegorz Racki and Spencer Lucas have claimed the site to be older and dated to the middle Norian stage based on biostratigraphy of large vertebrates, including Lisowicia. They instead suggested Lisowicia was not significantly younger than other dicynodonts and was similar in age to the last known genera elsewhere in the world.

A sample of detrital zircons from the Lipie Śląskie clay pit was radiometrically dated to determine the maximum age of deposition for the fossil beds. The youngest zircon grain recorded an age of approximately 211 ± 3 million years old in the late Norian, however due to the discrepancy between the formation of the zircon crystals and deposition as sediment it is likely that Lipie Śląskie is younger than this, corroborating the late Norian to early Rhaetian estimates.

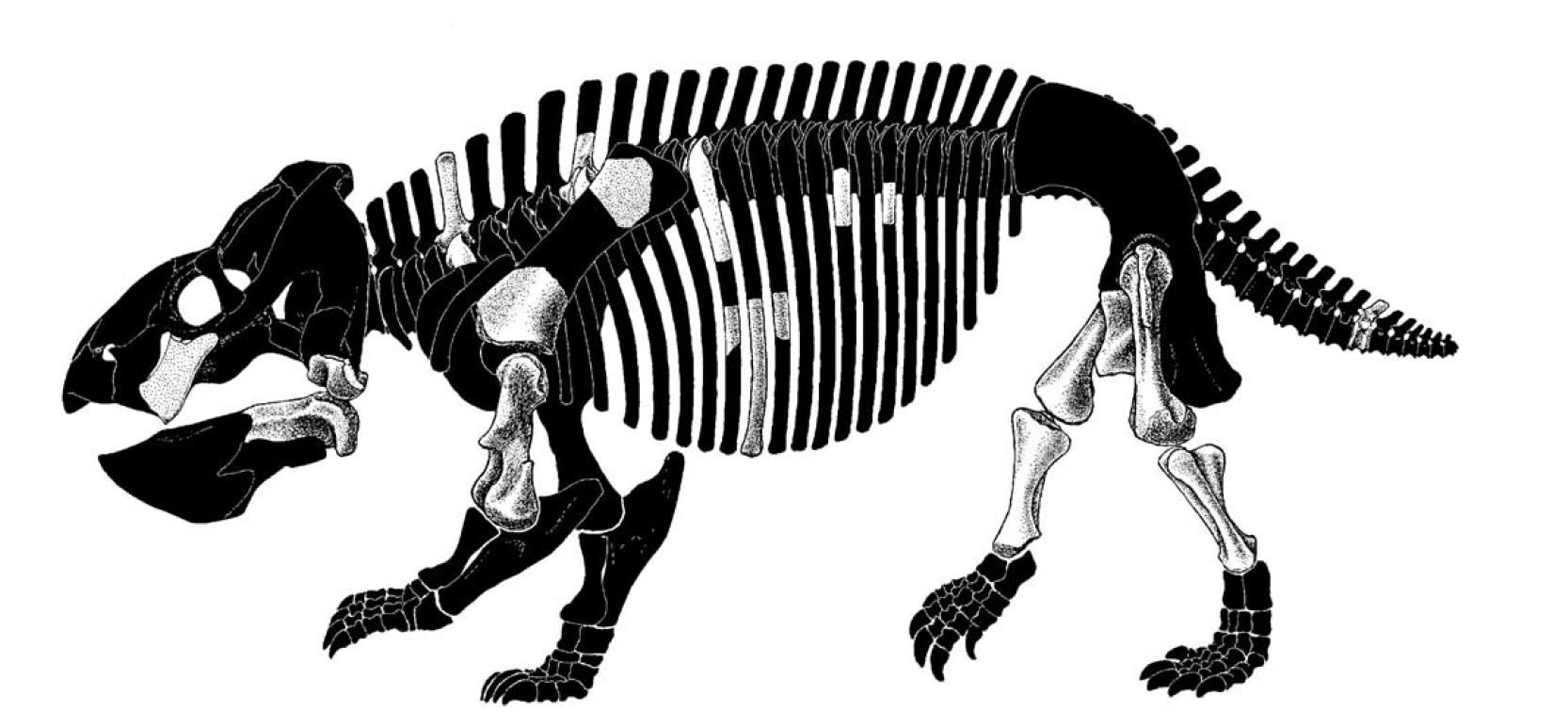
Outdated skeletal reconstruction based on the original 2008 interpretation of the skeleton

Remains of Lisowicia were first discovered in 2006 by palaeontologists Jerzy Dzik, Tomasz Sulej and Grzegorz Niedźwiedzki, who initially mistook them for the bones of a sauropodomorph dinosaur due to their massive size. They later recognised the fossils as those of a giant dicynodont in 2008, by then known from a partially articulated skeleton and various isolated bones from at least two individuals. Between 2007—2014, over 1,000 bones of Lisowicia were collected from the clay pit.

Lisowicia would not be officially named and published as a new taxon until January 2019, although the name and the description were released online in November 2018 prior to the official publication date. The genus is named after the village Lisowice where the original specimens were found, while the specific name bojani honours Ludwig Heinrich Bojanus (1776–1827), a German physician and naturalist who did pioneering work in comparative anatomy and paleontology. The known fossils of Lisowicia are held in the collections of the Institute of Paleobiology at the Polish Academy of Sciences and the Department of Paleobiology and Evolution at the University of Warsaw, Poland.

== Classification ==
Lisowicia is a kannemeyeriiform, the group to which most Triassic dicynodonts belong to, and is a member of the family Stahleckeriidae, the only remaining lineage of dicynodonts present in the Late Triassic. In particular, phylogenetic analyses by Sulej & Niedźwiedzki (2019) using two separate datasets both found Lisowicia to be closely related to the well-known North American genus Placerias in the subfamily Placeriinae, together with the Moroccan Moghreberia. A similar result was recovered by Szczygielski & Sulej (2023) in their description of the Polish dicynodont Woznikella, which also recovered the South African Pentasaurus at the base of Placeriinae, while Woznikella itself was found in a more distant position outside Stahleckeriidae.

The cladogram below is modified and simplified from Szczygielski & Sulej (2023) to focus on the relationships of stahleckeriids and their closest relatives, depicting the strict consensus of the three shortest (most parsimonious) trees:

- Kannemeyeriiformes
  - Shansiodontidae
  - - Dinodontosaurus
    - - "Kannemeyeriidae"
      - - Angonisaurus
        - - Woznikella
          - Stahleckeriidae
            - Placeriinae
              - Pentasaurus
              - - Lisowicia
                - - Placerias
                  - Moghreberia
            - Stahleckeriinae
              - Stahleckeria
              - - Eubrachiosaurus
                - Sangusaurus parringtoni
                - Sangusaurus sp.
                - - Ischigualastia
                  - Jachaleria

An alternative non-cladistic phylogeny for kannemeyeriiforms was proposed by Tomasz Sulej in 2024 in his osteological description of Lisowicia. Rather than determining relationships based only on morphology, as in most cladistic analyses, Sulej also used stratigraphic and biogeographic information to hypothesise ancestor-descendent relationships in space and time. This approach in palaeontology has been termed "chronophyletics" by Polish palaeontologist Jerzy Dzik. These results differ noticeably from conventional cladistics-based phylogenies, such as the tree shown above. Sulej identified Lisowicia as the last member of a Laurasian kannemeyeriiform lineage, beginning with the "kannemeyeriid" Shaanbeikannemeyeria in the Middle Triassic, through Rabidosaurus, Woznikella (in contrast to its more distant position recovered cladistically) to Placerias before culminating in Lisowicia. Unlike the cladistic tree above, he proposed that most stahleckeriines did not share close common ancestry with placeriines but instead emerged from a distinct lineage of Middle Triassic "kannemeyeriids" that migrated into Gondwana descending from the Laurasian Rhadiodromus and Parakannemeyeria.

Sulej argued that the shape of the frontals and parietals, particularly their cross-section along the midline where they surround the braincase, was one of the key distinctions separating these lines of descent. In Lisowicia and members of the Laurasian lineage, the parietals are vertically elongated and triangular, tapering down to a point. By contrast, stahleckeriines and members of their lineage have shorter parietals that have broader, more rounded bottom edges. On the surface the parietal foramen is also positioned closer to the rear of the skull in the Laurasian lineage, and the frontals are longer and participate in the margin of the orbit. A single articulation surface for the shoulder and ribs on the sternum was also identified as a characteristic of this lineage.

=== Dicynodont gigantism and evolution ===
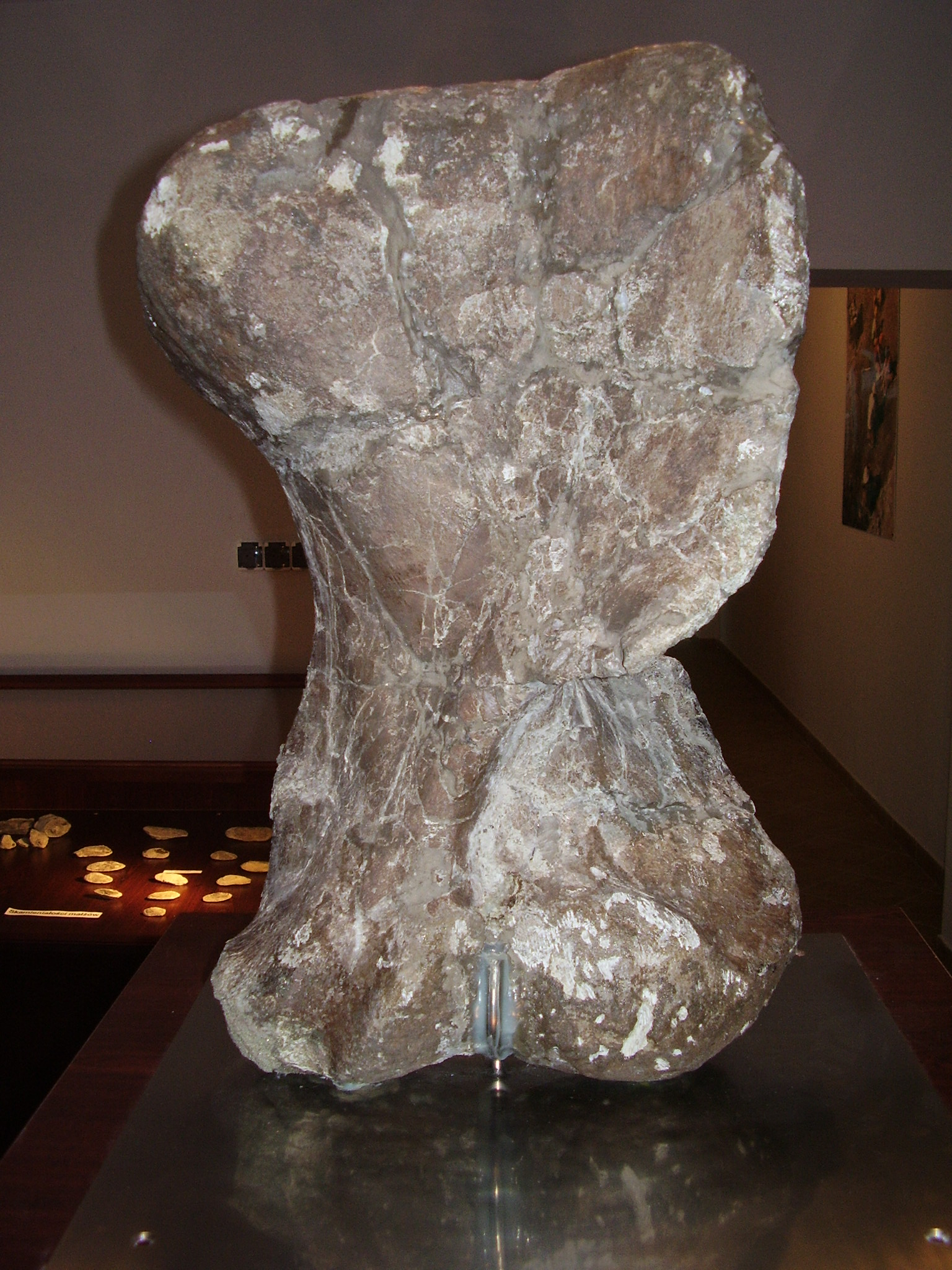
Mounted fossil humerus of Lisowicia

Prior to the discovery of Lisowicia, the evolution of giant body sizes in Triassic sauropodomorphs was thought to be an exclusive trait of dinosaurs, as other large herbivores—including the dicynodonts—were not thought to have achieved similar sizes. The elephantine size of Lisowicia demonstrates that gigantism also evolved in dicynodonts, and analysis of their body size as they evolved over the course of the Late Triassic demonstrates that, like sauropodomorphs, Triassic dicynodonts were also increasing in body size, culminating in Lisowicia. In fact, dicynodonts were consistently larger than sauropodomorphs during the Carnian stage, and both achieved similar gigantic sizes in the Norian to the Rhaetian with Lisowicia. The evolution of gigantism in both sauropodomorphs and Lisowicia at similar time periods suggests that ecological factors may have allowed and encouraged both lineages to grow to giant sizes, as opposed to specific traits inherent to sauropodomorph dinosaurs as had previously been suggested.

The evolution of gigantism in dicynodonts was a gradual process, occurring over approximately 20 million years, and acquired major restructuring of the musculo-skeletal system to achieve the size and posture of Lisowicia. It's possible that gigantism in Lisowicia was driven by increasing body size in predators, or as a metabolic adaptation for getting more nutrition out of their food by increasing the size of their gut. It also highlights that dicynodont evolution in the Late Triassic is still poorly understood. Previously considered to be geographically restricted and in decline, Lisowicia demonstrates that dicynodonts were both still geographically widespread and continuing to diversify in the Late Triassic, particularly evolving traits to support massive body sizes.

== Palaeobiology ==
=== Feeding and diet ===
Lisowicia was a herbivore, like most other dicynodonts, using its relatively long beak to crop and chew, although its large size implies it was feeding on higher levels of vegetation than was typical for the group. On the other hand, Sulej (2024) proposed that Lisowicia was a "grazer" that fed on low-lying vegetation. This suggestion was based on the orientation of the orbits and the low position of the occipital condyles (where the skull joins the neck), interpreted as indicating that its head was habitually held tilted down towards the ground. In this position, the slightly upward-directed orbits would now face the eyes forwards towards the horizon as it fed.

Coprolites attributed to Lisowicia indicate that it mostly ate soft vegetation and conifers. However, some coprolites contain large portions of woody material, a trait observed in some other dicynodont coprolites. This has been suggested to represent seasonal variation in its diet, possibly when their preferred diet of soft vegetation was out of season.

=== Predation ===
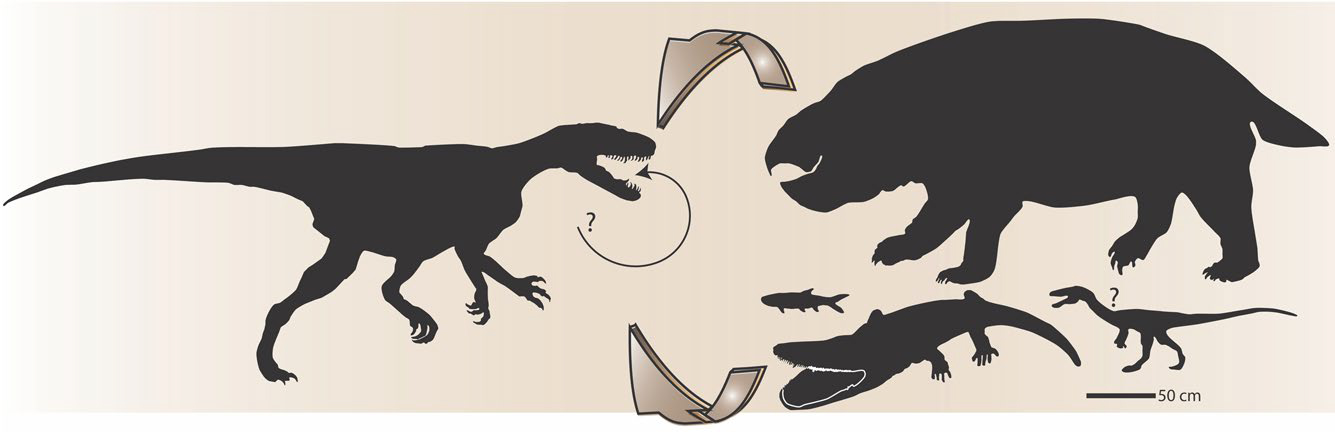
Smok (far left) with prey animals, including the dicynodont (far right), as inferred from coprolite contents and bones with bite marks

Numerous bite marks have been found on the bones of juvenile dicynodonts from the same locality where the dicynodont Lisowicia and the predatory archosaur Smok were found, indicating that juvenile dicynodonts were preferentially and actively hunted by Smok. Dicynodont bone fragments have also been identified in the proposed coprolites of Smok, implying that dicynodonts like Lisowicia were a major component in the predator's diet. Based on the absence of nasals and rarity of other snout bones, Sulej (2024) suggested that the snout of Lisowicia may have been structurally weak, and so preferentially targeted by predators like Smok either during predation or by disarticulating the snout first from the carcass.

=== Growth ===
Histological studies from the limb bones of Lisowicia showed features characteristic of a rapid growth rate as juveniles, similar to other large dicynodonts. However, while the growth rate of other dicynodonts slowed down as they grew, the studied bones of Lisowicia showed no such signs of slowing their growth. The possibility that the bones belonged to juveniles with an even larger adult body size than estimated was ruled out partly on the basis of their already massive size, but also because the bones were well ossified and developmentally mature. Instead, it's more likely that Lisowicia grew very rapidly without any interruptions until reaching their adult body size, as there were no clear lines of arrested growth (LAGs) that otherwise indicate periods of slower, reduced growth. LAGs may have been truly absent, or were possibly erased by extensive remodelling of the bone into adulthood, both of which would support permanently rapid growth in Lisowicia, similar to mammals and some dinosaurs.

=== Latrines ===
Coprolites attributed to Lisowicia have been discovered in abundant accumulations in areas believed to have been around standing water. These assemblages are similar to discoveries in Brazil believed to represent communal latrines made by the dicynodont Dinodontosaurus, and it's possible that Lisowicia may have performed a similar behaviour. Communal latrines are documented in modern gregarious mammals, and support the idea that dicynodonts like Lisowicia lived in herds and even suggest that they had complex social behaviours like modern large mammals.

== Palaeoecology ==
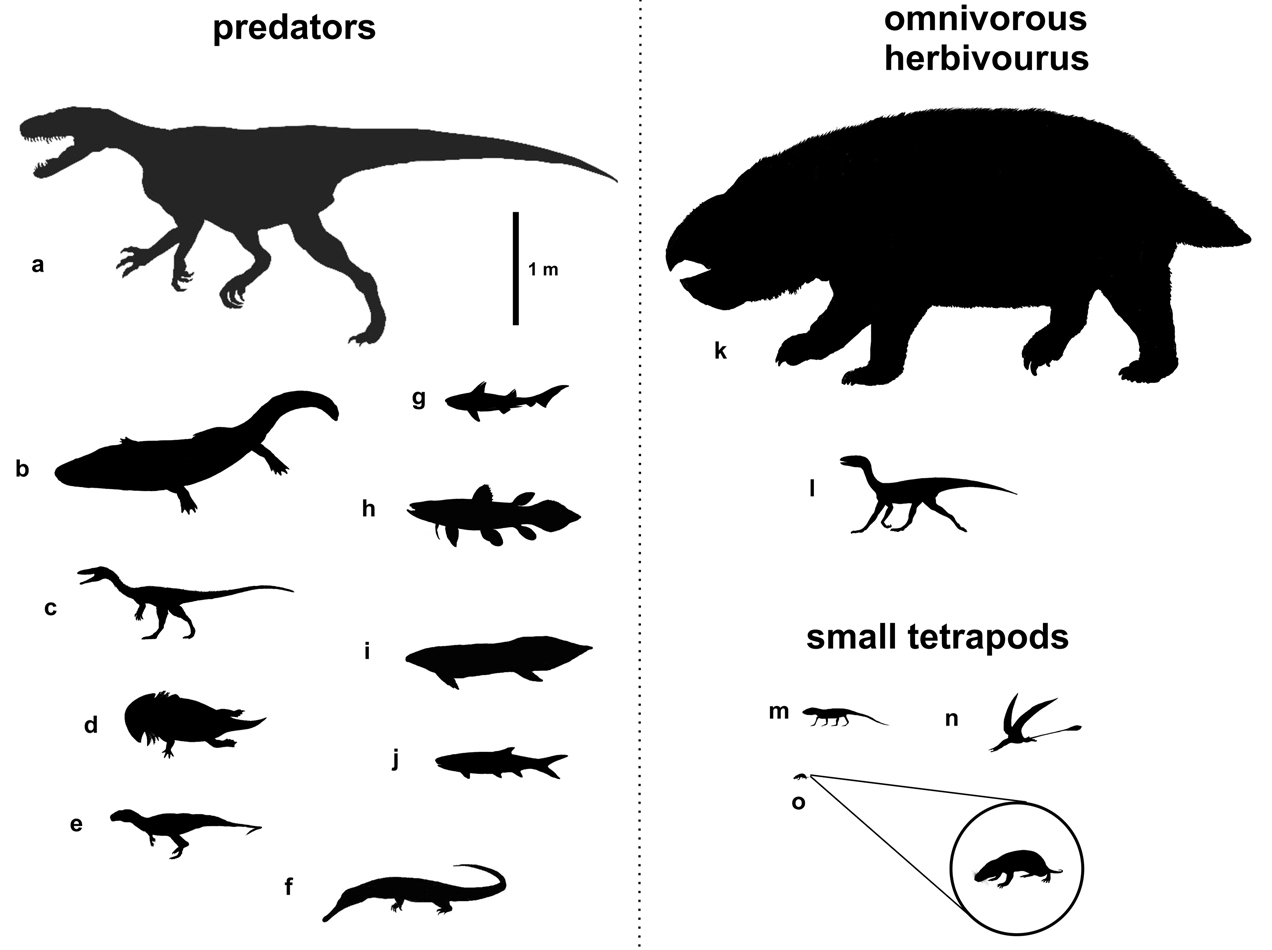
Drawing of the vertebrate faunal assemblage of the Lisowice site

Lisowicia coexisted with a broad variety of Late Triassic animals in Lipie Śląskie. The majority of these animals were archosaurs, including the large predatory archosaur Smok, small dinosauromorphs including a silesaurid and a Coelophysis-like neotheropod, pterosaurs, and a small crocodylomorph (previously believed to be a poposauroid). Other small reptiles include a sphenodont, an indeterminate archosauromorph and a possible choristodere. The only other synapsid known to coexist with Lisowicia was Hallautherium, a small morganucodont mammaliaform closely related to modern mammals and many orders of magnitude smaller than Lisowicia. The wet, freshwater environment supported temnospondyl amphibians (a capitosaur and smaller plagiosaurid) as well as an abundance of fish including lungfish, coelacanths and hybodontid sharks.

The environment at Lipie Śląskie was wet and swampy, comparable to the modern-day everglades, with slow-moving meandering rivers and oxbow lakes, surrounded by abundant vegetation that included Cheirolepidiaceae conifers and ginkgoales, seed ferns such as Lepidopteris and the cycads Androstrobus and Beania. By contrast, neighbouring environments may have been dry and arid, suggested by remains of the possibly xerophytic conifer Hirmeriella and charcoal fragments from fires being transported by rivers to the locality.

The absence of any large sauropodomorph herbivores is curious, as they are present in many other Late Triassic ecosystems, including in nearby localities in Europe, such as Plateosaurus in Germany. It's possible that giant dicynodonts like Lisowicia competed directly with sauropodomorphs, however, it was also possible that their absence was unrelated, and instead Lisowicia grew to its massive size to fill the ecological role of large browsing herbivores otherwise occupied by sauropodomorphs in other ecosystems.
