= Ermaying Formation =

Geological formation in China

- Stratigraphic range: Anisian; ~247–242 Ma
- Type: Geological formation
- Sub-units: Two Members
- Underlies: Tongchuan Formation
- Overlies: Heshanggou Formation
- Thickness: Up to 600 metres (2,000 ft)

Lithology
- Primary: Mudstone, sandstone
- Other: Tuff

Location
- Coordinates: 37°26′15″N 110°39′06″E
- Approximate paleocoordinates: 38.2°N 90.5°E
- Region: Shaanxi, Shanxi, Inner Mongolia
- Country: China
- Ermaying Formation (China) Ermaying Formation (Shanxi)

The Ermaying Formation is a geological formation of Anisian (Middle Triassic) age in north-central China. It is found across much of the Ordos Basin, at outcrops within the provinces of Shaanxi, Shanxi, and Inner Mongolia. It is composed of up to 600 m thick sequence of mudstone and sandstone, overlying the Heshanggou Formation and underlying the Tongchuan Formation. In the southern part of the Ordos Basin, the Zhifang Formation is equivalent to the Ermaying Formation.

The Ermaying Formation is divided into two members, each with a distinctive assemblage of tetrapod fossils. A 2013 study used SHRIMP U-Pb radiometric dating to assign an imprecise age of 245.9 ± 3.2 Ma for the upper member. A 2018 study assigned a more precise age of around 243.53 Ma based on three ash samples near the base of the upper member. This would indicate that the Upper Ermaying Formation is no older than the late Anisian stage.

A few studies apply the name "Ermaying Formation" to a sedimentary unit in the Yanshan belt, a fold-thrust belt northeast of Beijing. In the Yanshan belt, reported exposures of the formation are dated to the Late Triassic, lying below the Early Jurassic Xingshikou Formation. The Yanshan belt exposures are also known as the Huzhangzi Formation, an alternative name proposed to reflect their chronological and geographic divergence from exposures in the Ordos Basin.

== Paleobiota ==
The Ermaying Formation is notable for its diversity of well-preserved tetrapods.

The upper member occupies most of a biozone historically known as the Sinokannemeyeria fauna. This fossil assemblage has more recently been termed the Sinokannemeyeria-Shansisuchus Assemblage Zone, including approximately coeval sediments of the Kelamayi Formation in Xinjiang. The biozone also extends up to the early part of the Tongchuan Formation.

Tetrapod burrows are known from the formation, occupying both large and small size classes. The larger burrow is reniform (kidney-shaped) in cross section, about 13 centimetres (5.1 in) in height and 30 centimetres (12 in) in width. It shallowly slopes down when seen from the side and smoothly undulates when seen from above. Scatches and grooves are readily visible on the inside. The burrow-maker was medium-sized animal, likely a juvenile dicynodont. The smaller burrows are low tapered chambers with incomplete or collapsed entry ramps. They may have been dug out by procolophonids or juvenile cynodonts.

Color key: Taxon / Reclassified taxon / Taxon falsely reported as present / Dubious taxon or junior synonym / Ichnotaxon / Ootaxon / Morphotaxon	Notes; Uncertain or tentative taxa are in small text; ~~crossed out~~ taxa are discredited.

=== Synapsids ===
Apart from the taxa listed here, fossils of an unnamed genus of kannemeyeriiform dicynodont have been found in the Upper Ermaying Formation at the Sanjiao site in Shanxi Province. Not counting Shansiodon, this unnamed form is the third "kannemeyeriid" genus known from the Upper Member, as it is distinct from both Parakannemeyeria and Sinokannemeyeria.

==== Cynodonts ====
Cynodonts of the Ermaying Formation
Taxa	Species	Material	Member	Notes	Images
Sinognathus	S. gracilis	A skull	Upper	A sinognathine trirachodontid cynodont.	

==== Dicynodonts ====
Dicynodonts of the Ermaying Formation
Taxa	Species	Material	Member	Notes	Images
Parakannemeyeria	P. dolicocephala	A skull and partial skeleton.	Upper	A "kannemeyeriid" dicynodont, the type species of Parakannemeyeria.	
Parakannemeyeria	P. ningwuensis	Skulls and partial skeletons.	Upper	A "kannemeyeriid" dicynodont.	
Parakannemeyeria	P. shenmuensis	A skull	Upper	A "kannemeyeriid" dicynodont.	
Parakannemeyeria	P. xingxianensis	A skull and postcrania.	Lower	A "kannemeyeriid" dicynodont. Sometimes considered a junior synonym of P. ningwuensis.	
Parakannemeyeria	P. youngi	Multiple partial skeletons.	Lower?, Upper	A "kannemeyeriid" dicynodont.	
Shaanbeikannemeyeria	S. buerdongia	A skull and postcrania.	Lower	A "kannemeyeriid" dicynodont. Sometimes considered a species of Kannemeyeria or Rechnisaurus, and more recently as a junior synonym of S. xilougouensis.	
Shaanbeikannemeyeria	S. xilougouensis	Multiple partial skeletons.	Lower	A "kannemeyeriid" dicynodont, the type species of Shaanbeikannemeyeria. Sometimes considered a species of Kannemeyeria or Rechnisaurus, though its validity was strongly supported by a 2022 redescription.	
Shansiodon	S. shaabeiensis	A skull	Upper	A shansiodontid dicynodont.	
Shansiodon	S. wangi	A nearly complete skeleton with skull.	Upper	A shansiodontid dicynodont, the type species of Shansiodon.	
Shansiodon	S. wuhsiangensis	Skulls and postcrania.	Upper	A shansiodontid dicynodont.	
Shansiodon	S. wupuensis	A skull	Upper	A shansiodontid dicynodont.	
Sinokannemeyeria	S. pearsoni	Multiple partial skeletons.	Upper	A "kannemeyeriid" dicynodont, the type species of Sinokannemeyeria.	
Sinokannemeyeria	S. sanchuanheensis	A skull	Upper	A "kannemeyeriid" dicynodont, sometimes considered a species of Kannemeyeria.	
Sinokannemeyeria	S. yingchiaoensis	Skulls and partial skeletons.	Upper	A "kannemeyeriid" dicynodont.	

==== Therocephalians ====
Therocephalians of the Ermaying Formation
Taxa	Species	Material	Member	Notes	Images
Nothogomphodon	N. sanjiaoensis	A partial jaw.	Upper	A baurioid therocephalian.	
Ordosia	O. youngi	A partial skull and postcrania.	Lower	A baurioid therocephalian, sometimes considered a species of Ordosiodon.	
Ordosiodon	O. lincheyuensis	A partial jaw.	Lower	A baurioid therocephalian, initially misidentified as a diademodontid cynodont.	
Traversodontoides	T. wangwuensis	A skull and postcrania.	Upper	A traversodontid cynodont or baurioid therocephalian.	
Yikezhaogia	Y. megafenestrala	A skull and postcrania.	Lower	A therocephalian of uncertain affinities, potentially a "scaloposaur".	

=== Reptiles ===
Reptiles of the Ermaying Formation
Genus / Taxon	Species	Material	Member	Notes	Images
"Chasmatosuchus"	"C. ultimus"	A partial skull preserving the snout, jaw, and palate.	Upper	A dubious (crown)-archosaur previously misidentified as the proterosuchid Chasmatosuchus.	
Eumetabolodon	E. bathycephalus	An incomplete skull.	Lower	A procolophonid which is much more common in the Heshanggou Formation.	
Fenhosuchus	F. cristatus	Fragmentary skeletons.	Upper	A dubious archosauriform, possibly a chimera of fossils from Shansisuchus and paracrocodylomorph archosaurs.	
Guchengosuchus	G. shiguaiensis	A partial skeleton consisting of an incomplete skull, vertebrae, ribs, and (now missing) forelimb material.	Lower	A basal erythrosuchid archosauriform.	
Halazhaisuchus	H. qiaoensis	A partial skeleton consisting of forelimb and shoulder material, vertebrae, ribs, and osteoderms.	Lower	A euparkeriid archosauriform.	
Neoprocolophon	N. asiaticus	A skull.	Upper	A procolophonid.	
Paoteodon	P. huanghoensis	A maxilla fragment.	Lower	A dubious procolophonid.	
Shansisuchus	S. heiyuekouensis	Fragmentary skeletons.	Upper	An erythrosuchid archosauriform of uncertain validity.	
Shansisuchus	S. kuyeheensis	A partial skeleton consisting of an incomplete skull, vertebrae, humerus, and shoulder material	Upper	An erythrosuchid archosauriform of uncertain validity.	
Shansisuchus	S. shansisuchus	Multiple partial skeletons.	Upper	A large erythrosuchid archosauriform, the type species of Shansisuchus.	
Taihangosuchus	T. wuxiangensis	Two partial skeletons, one including a skull	Upper	A gracilisuchid pseudosuchian	
"Turfanosuchus"	"T. shageduensis"	A partial skeleton consisting of limb and shoulder material, vertebrae, and a mandible.	Lower	A dubious archosauriform, presumably a euparkeriid unrelated to Turfanosuchus dabanensis.	
"Wangisuchus"	"W. tzeyii"	Maxillae.	Upper	A dubious archosauriform.	
