= Ntawere Formation =

Middle Triassic geological formation in Zambia

- Stratigraphic range: Anisian; ~247–242 Ma
- Type: Geological formation
- Sub-units: Lower Ntawere, Upper Ntawere
- Underlies: Red Marls
- Overlies: Escarpment Grit

Lithology
- Primary: Mudstone
- Other: Sandstone, marl

Location
- Coordinates: 10.8°S 33.1°E
- Approximate paleocoordinates: 53.6°S 20.6°E
- Region: Eastern Province
- Country: Zambia
- Extent: Luangwa Basin
- Ntawere Formation (Zambia)

The Ntawere Formation is a Middle Triassic (Anisian) geological formation in Zambia, preserving fossils of synapsids, archosaurs, and temnospondyls.

== Geology ==
Several different facies are present in the Ntawere Formation, reconstructing a floodplain environment. The coarsest facies are trough cross-bedded conglomeratic sandstone full of mineral concretions. These coarse deposits formed in ancient channels such as riverbeds. Another type of facies involves thick beds of mudstone interbedding with thinner layers of fine-grained sandstone, indicating alternating low- and high-energy water flow within the channels. Graded sandstone to mudstone overbank deposits (complete with ripple marks) occur near channel deposits. Extensive successions of laminated or massive mudstone are common, often containing slickensides, calcareous nodules or layers (marls), and/or hematite nodules. These types of thick mud/marl layers likely formed in more quiet parts of the floodplain isolated from turbulent channels.

The floodplain was seemingly more active during the deposition of the Lower Ntaware Formation, as coarser sandstone channel fills are prevalent in that section while extensive mudstone layers are more common in the Upper Ntaware Formation. Fossils are typically found preserved in calcareous nodules in the mudstone of the Upper Ntaware, although they occur in some parts of the Lower Ntaware as well. The Ntaware Formation is an example of red beds, which are typically deposited in warm environments with seasonal ponds and rivers tied to wet and dry seasons.

== Paleobiota ==
=== Invertebrates ===
Invertebrates of the Ntawere Formation
Taxon	Member	Material	Notes
Unio karooensis	Upper Ntaware	Shells	A freshwater unionid bivalve

=== Fish ===
Fish of the Ntawere Formation
Taxon	Member	Material	Notes
Hybodontoidei indet.	Upper Ntaware	Fin spines	An indeterminate non-hybodontid hybodontoid shark, similar to Lissodus and Lonchidion
Ptycoceratodontidae indet.	Lower Ntaware, Upper Ntawere	Tooth plates	An indeterminate lungfish, similar to Ptychoceratodus

=== Amphibians ===
Amphibians of the Ntawere Formation
Taxon	Member	Material	Notes	Images
Batrachosuchus concordi	Upper Ntaware	A skull and forelimbs	A brachyopid stereospondyl	
Cherninia megarhina	Upper Ntaware	A partial skull	A mastodonsaurid stereospondyl	
"Stanocephalosaurus" pronus	Upper Ntaware	A skull	A new species of capitosauroid, likely not part of the genus Stanocephalosaurus	
Stereospondyli indet.	Upper Ntaware	Vertebrae and part of a jaw	Indeterminate stereospondyl material. The jaw fragment may belong to a rhinesuchid, lydekkerinid, or rhytidosteid	

=== Synapsids ===
Synapsids of the Ntawere Formation
Taxon	Member	Material	Notes	Images
Cricodon metabolus	Upper Ntaware	A partial skeleton	A trirachodontid cynodont	
Cynognathus crateronotus	Lower Ntaware	Teeth, vertebrae, partial humerus, ilium	A cynognathian cynodont	
Diademodon tetragonus	Lower Ntaware	A skull	A diademodontid cynodont	
"Kannemeyeria" latirostris	Lower Ntaware	A skull	A kannemeyeriiform dicynodont, possibly a species of Kannemeyeria or Dolichuranus	
Kannemeyeria lophorhinus	Lower Ntaware	A skull	A kannemeyeriid dicynodont	
Luangwa drysdalli	Upper Ntaware	Skulls and postcranial material	A traversodontid cynodont	
Sangusaurus edentatus	Upper Ntaware	A partial skull	A stahleckeriid dicynodont	
Traversodontidae sp.	Upper Ntaware	Skulls and postcranial material	An unnamed species of gomphodont-like traversodontid cynodont	
Zambiasaurus submersus	Upper Ntaware	A skull fragment	A stahleckeriid dicynodont	

=== Archosauromorphs ===
Archosauromorphs of the Ntawere Formation
Taxon	Member	Material	Notes	Images
Archosauriformes indet.	Upper Ntaware	Teeth	Various indeterminate large carnivorous archosauriforms, likely loricatans	
Archosauromorpha indet.	Upper Ntaware	A neck vertebra	An indeterminate archosauromorph, possibly an allokotosaur	
Dinosauriformes indet.	Upper Ntaware	A partial fibula	A large dracohortian, likely a silesaurid	
Loricata indet.	Upper Ntaware	Vertebrae	An indeterminate large archosaur, similar to Stagonosuchus	
Lutungutali sitwensis	Upper Ntaware	An ilium	A basal silesaurid	
Shuvosauridae indet.	Upper Ntaware	Part of a femur	An indeterminate shuvosaurid archosaur similar to Shuvosaurus and the indeterminate "Moenkopi poposauroid"	
Silesauridae indet.	Upper Ntaware	A maxilla, femurs, and material from the hip, ankle, and foot	Indeterminate basal silesaurid material comparable to Asilisaurus and Lutungutali	

== See also ==
- Donguz Formation, contemporaneous fossiliferous formation of Russia
- Ermaying Formation, contemporaneous fossiliferous formation of China
- Manda Formation, contemporaneous fossiliferous formation of Tanzania
- Omingonde Formation, contemporaneous fossiliferous formation of Namibia
- Río Seco de la Quebrada Formation, contemporaneous fossiliferous formation of Argentina
- Yerrapalli Formation, contemporaneous fossiliferous formation of India
