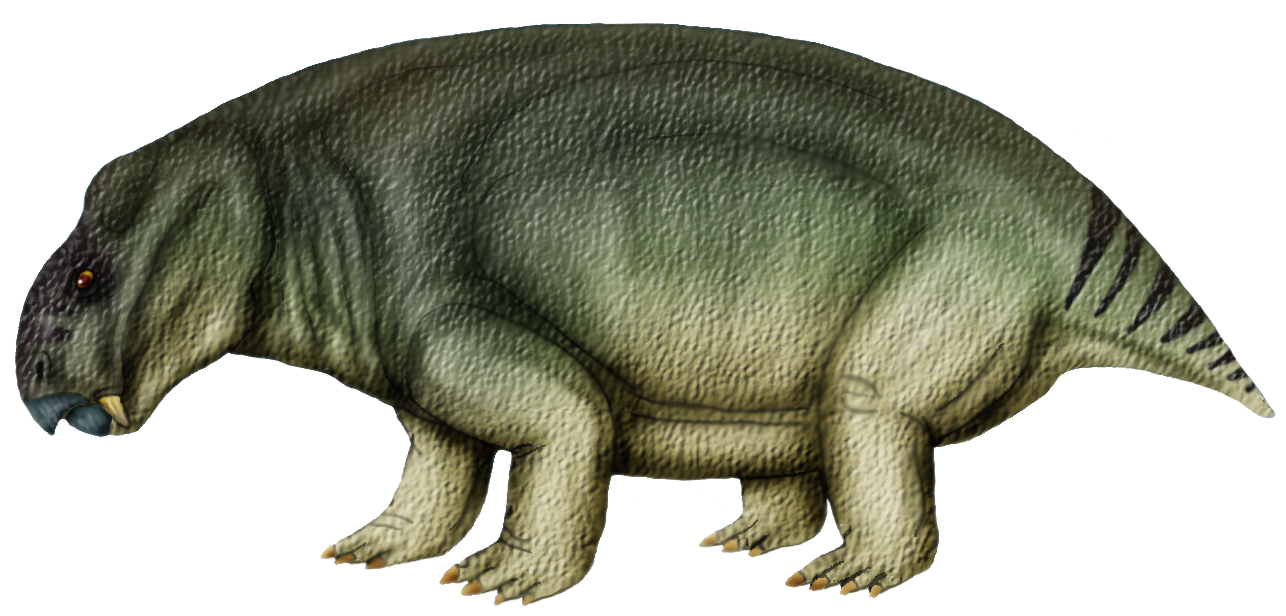
- Life restoration of Acratophorus

Scientific classification
- Kingdom: Animalia
- Phylum: Chordata
- Clade: Synapsida
- Clade: Therapsida
- Clade: †Anomodontia
- Clade: †Dicynodontia
- Infraorder: †Dicynodontoidea
- Clade: †Kannemeyeriiformes
- Genus: †Acratophorus; Kammerer & Ordoñez, 2021
- Species: †A. argentinensis

Binomial name
- †Acratophorus argentinensis (Bonaparte, 1966)

Synonyms
- Kannemeyeria argentinensis Bonaparte, 1966; "Vinceria argentinensis" Fröbisch, 2009; Vinceria vieja Domnanovich & Marsicano, 2012

= Acratophorus argentinensis =

Acratophorus argentinensis Temporal range: Middle Triassic, Anisian

Extinct species of dicynodont

Acratophorus is an extinct genus of dicynodont that lived during the Anisian age of the Middle Triassic-aged Río Seco de la Quebrada Formation in what is now Argentina. The type species, A. argentinensis, was originally placed in the genus Kannemeyeria by Jose Bonaparte in 1966, and later sometimes referred to Vinceria, before being transferred to a new, distinct genus, Acratophorus, in 2021 by Christian Kammerer and Angi Ordoñez. The species Vinceria vieja was also made a synonym of A. argentinensis in 2021. The holotype is PVL 3645, a partial skeleton discovered probably between the 1930s and the early 1960s near a farm house in Puesto Viejo.
