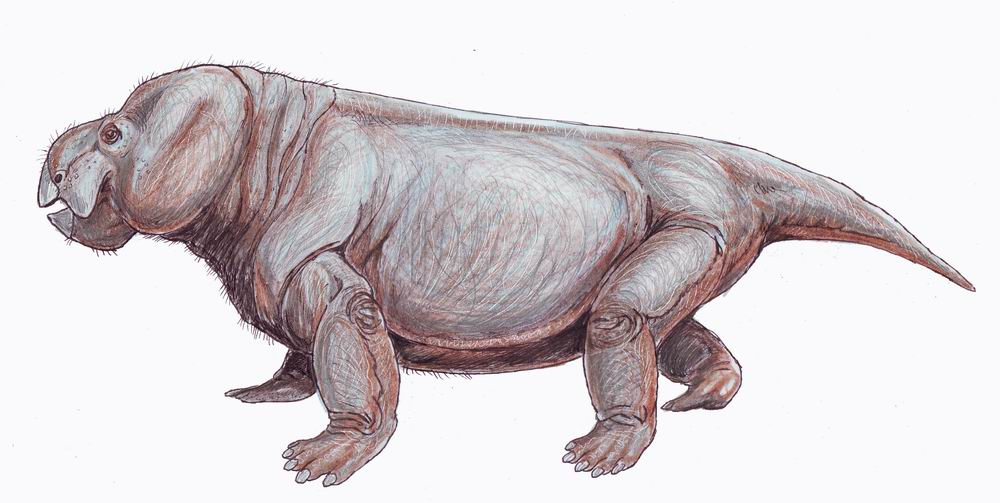
- Restoration of Stahleckeria potens

Scientific classification
- Kingdom: Animalia
- Phylum: Chordata
- Clade: Synapsida
- Clade: Therapsida
- Clade: †Anomodontia
- Clade: †Dicynodontia
- Infraorder: †Dicynodontoidea
- Clade: †Kannemeyeriiformes von Huene, 1948

Subgroups
- †Acratophorus; †Angonisaurus; †Dinodontosaurus; †Dolichuranus; †Kannemeyeria; †Parakannemeyeria; †Rabidosaurus; †Rechnisaurus; †Repelinosaurus?; †Rhadiodromus; †Shaanbeikannemeyeria; †Sinokannemeyeria; †Uralokannemeyeria; †Wadiasaurus; †Xiyukannemeyeria; †Shansiodontidae; †Stahleckeriidae

= Kannemeyeriiformes =

Kannemeyeriiforms Temporal range: Triassic, 251.3–201.4 Ma

Extinct clade of dicynodonts

Kannemeyeriiformes is a group of large-bodied Triassic dicynodonts. As a clade, Kannemeyeriiformes has been defined to include the species Kannemeyeria simocephalus and all dicynodonts more closely related to it than to the species Lystrosaurus murrayi.

== Evolutionary history ==
Despite being the most species-rich group of dicynodonts in the Triassic Period, kannemeyeriiforms exhibit much less diversity in terms of their anatomy and ecological roles than the dicynodonts from the Permian Period.

Lystrosauridae is thought to be the most closely related group (sister taxon) to Kannemeyeriiformes, and since the earliest lystrosaurids are known from the Late Permian, the divergence of these two groups must have occurred at least as far back as this time, implying that a long ghost lineage must exist. Although no kannemeyeriiforms have been found in the Late Permian yet, the recent discovery of Sungeodon helps fill a gap in the early fossil record of the group by showing that kannemeyeriiforms diversified right after the Permian-Triassic extinction event.

== Classification ==
Four families have been included in the group: Kannemeyeriidae, Shansiodontidae, Stahleckeriidae, and Dinodontosauridae. Occasionally some of these families are not recognized, with most kannemeyeriiforms being placed in Kannemeyeriidae. Recent phylogenetic analyses suggest that these families represent similar body plans or morphotypes rather than true evolutionary groupings.

=== Phylogeny ===
Below is a cladogram from Szczygielski & Sulej (2023):

- Kannemeyeriiformes
  - Shansiodontidae
    - Rhinodicynodon
    - - Tetragonias
      - - Shansiodon
        - Vinceria
  - - Dinodontosaurus
    - - "Kannemeyeriidae"
        - Dolichuranus
        - - - - Acratophorus
              - - Rabidosaurus
                - Wadiasaurus
            - - Sinokannemeyeria
              - - Parakannemeyeria
                - Xiyukannemeyeria
          - - Rhadiodromus
            - - Shaanbeikannemeyeria
              - - Kannemeyeria
                - - Rechnisaurus
                  - Uralokannemeyeria
      - - Angonisaurus
        - - Woznikella
          - Stahleckeriidae
