= Puesto Viejo =

Coordinates: 22°28′S 65°25′W

- Municipality and town
- Interactive map of Puesto Viejo
- Country: Argentina
- Province: Jujuy Province
- Time zone: UTC−3 (ART)

For the mountain pass between Chile and Argentina, see Pampa Alta Pass (Puesto Viejo).

Puesto Viejo is a town and municipality in Jujuy Province in Argentina.
