= Fenhosuchus =

Fenhosuchus Temporal range: Middle Triassic, Anisian

Scientific classification
- Domain: Eukaryota
- Kingdom: Animalia
- Phylum: Chordata
- Class: Reptilia
- Clade: Archosauromorpha
- Clade: Archosauriformes
- Genus: †Fenhosuchus; Young, 1964

Type species
- †Fenhosuchus cristatus Young, 1964

Extinct genus of reptiles

Fenhosuchus is an extinct genus of archosauriform. The holotype, IVPP V 2697, and referred materials have been found in the Hsishihwa locality at Wuhsiang, China, from the Upper Ermaying Formation (also Ehrmaying). The locality dates back to the Anisian stage of the Middle Triassic. The genus was named after the Fen River in Shanxi Province from which specimens were found. It may prove to be a chimera being composed of material from several different animals. Some material were believed to represent a rauisuchid. The calcaneum of Fenhosuchus seems to belong to an erythrosuchid or other basal archosauriform. Much of the material of the tarsal bones seem to be similar to those of the genus Shansisuchus. According to Nesbitt (2009) the assessment of Gower (2000) was correct, the holotype is a mix of Shansisuchus remains and a possible fragment from a paracrocodylomorph or a dinosauriform. Thus, Fenhosuchus cannot be considered a rauisuchian.
