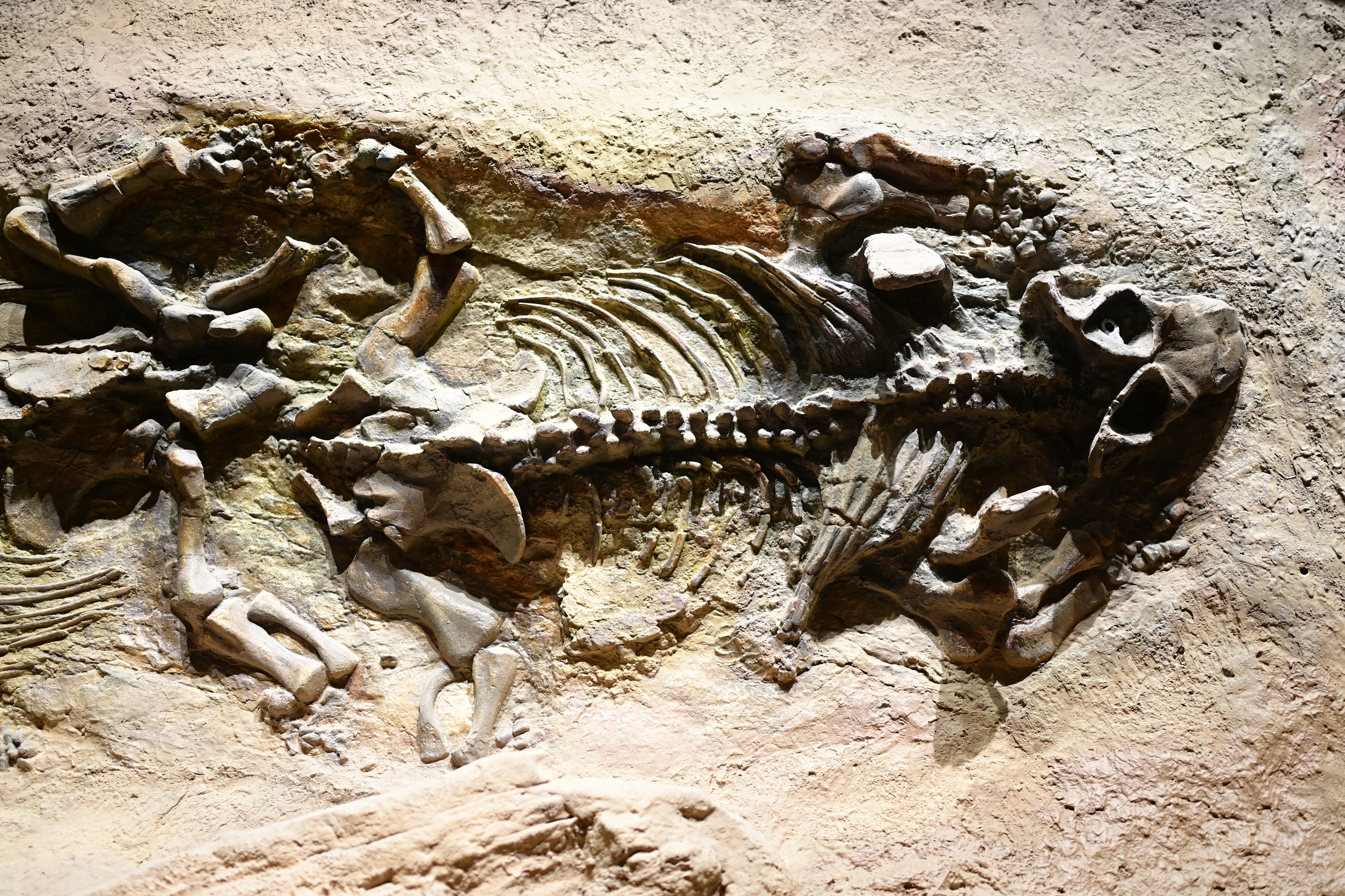
- Reconstructed skeleton, Baoding Natural History Museum

Scientific classification
- Kingdom: Animalia
- Phylum: Chordata
- Clade: Synapsida
- Clade: Therapsida
- Clade: †Anomodontia
- Clade: †Dicynodontia
- Clade: †Kannemeyeriiformes
- Genus: †Xiyukannemeyeria; Liu & Li, 2003

Species
- †X. brevirostris (Sun, 1978)

= Xiyukannemeyeria =

Xiyukannemeyeria Temporal range: Anisian ~247–242 Ma

Extinct genus of dicynodonts

Xiyukannemeyeria is a genus of dicynodont from Middle Triassic (Anisian) Kelamayi Formation of China. Originally was named as Parakannemeyeria brevirostris by Sun in 1978. But if included in Parakannemeyeria, this genus will not be a monophyletic group.

== Gallery ==
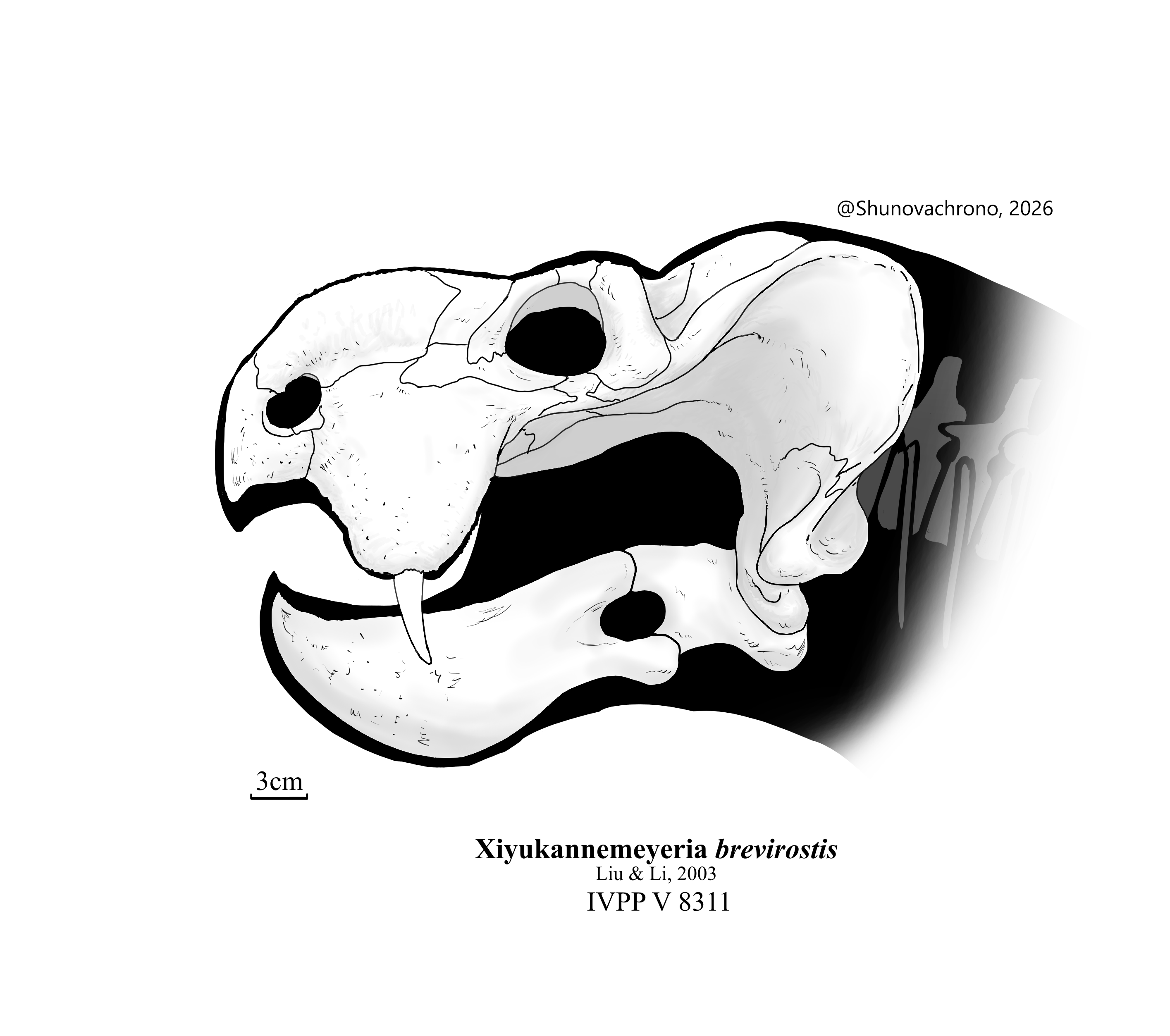
Xiyukannemeyeria brevirostris cranial reconstruction

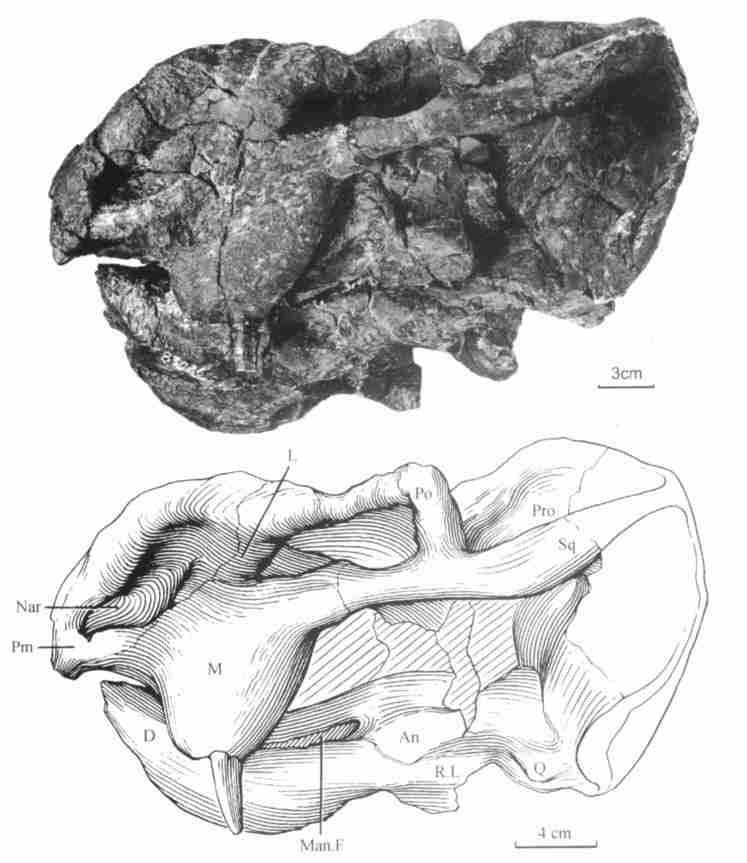
Xiyukannemeyeria brevirostris skull
