= Shaanbeikannemeyeria =

Shaanbeikannemeyeria Temporal range: Anisian

Scientific classification
- Kingdom: Animalia
- Phylum: Chordata
- Clade: Synapsida
- Clade: Therapsida
- Clade: †Anomodontia
- Clade: †Dicynodontia
- Clade: †Kannemeyeriiformes
- Genus: †Shaanbeikannemeyeria; Cheng, 1980

Species
- †S. xilougoensis Cheng, 1980 (type species)

Extinct genus of dicynodonts

Shaanbeikannemeyeria is an extinct genus of dicynodont known from the Early to Middle Triassic of China. It contains a single species, S. xilougoensis, which was described in 1980 by Zheng-Wu Cheng from a skull catalogued as IGCAGS V315. The specimen was lost, and a neotype skull IVPP V 11674 was later designated. A second species, S. buergondia, was named by Jin-Lin Li in 1980 from a partial skeleton, but it has since been regarded as a synonym of S. xilougoensis. In 2026, a paper by Wenwei Guo et al. identified material from Shaanbeikannemeyeria in the Heshanggou Formation, which dates to the earlier Olenekian stage of the Early Triassic.

== Paleobiology ==
Shaanbeikannemeyeria hails from the Ermaying Formation, which also yields the genera Fenhosuchus, Eumetabolodon, Halazhaisuchus, Guchengosuchus, Neoprocolophon, Ordosiodon, Wangisuchus and Shansisuchus.

== See also ==
- List of therapsids
