= Vinceria =

Vinceria Temporal range: Mid-Late Triassic ~242–222 Ma

Scientific classification
- Kingdom: Animalia
- Phylum: Chordata
- Clade: Synapsida
- Clade: Therapsida
- Clade: †Anomodontia
- Clade: †Dicynodontia
- Family: †Shansiodontidae
- Genus: †Vinceria; Bonaparte, 1969
- Species: †V. andina

Binomial name
- †Vinceria andina Bonaparte, 1969

Extinct genus of dicynodonts

Vinceria is an extinct genus of kannemeyeriiform dicynodont in the family Shansiodontidae. Fossils of the genus have been found in the Anisian Cerro de las Cabras Formation and Carnian Río Seco de la Quebrada Formation of Argentina. One species, V. argentinensis, named in 1966, was moved to its own genus, Acratophorus, in 2021. Another species, V. vieja, was merged with Acratophorus argentinensis in 2021, leaving V. andina as the only species in the genus.
