= Uralokannemeyeria =

Uralokannemeyeria Temporal range: Middle Triassic

Scientific classification
- Kingdom: Animalia
- Phylum: Chordata
- Clade: Synapsida
- Clade: Therapsida
- Clade: †Anomodontia
- Clade: †Dicynodontia
- Genus: †Uralokannemeyeria; Danilov, 1971
- Species: †U. vjuschkovi

Binomial name
- †Uralokannemeyeria vjuschkovi Danilov, 1971

Synonyms
- Edaxosaurus; ?Cristonasus

Extinct genus of dicynodonts

Uralokannemeyeria is an extinct genus of kannemeyeriiform dicynodont known from the Middle Triassic Donguz Formation of Bashkortostan, Russia.
