= Rhinodicynodon =

Rhinodicynodon Temporal range: Anisian ~247–242 Ma

Scientific classification
- Domain: Eukaryota
- Kingdom: Animalia
- Phylum: Chordata
- Clade: Synapsida
- Clade: Therapsida
- Suborder: †Anomodontia
- Clade: †Dicynodontia
- Family: †Shansiodontidae
- Genus: †Rhinodicynodon; Kalandadze 1970

Type species
- Rhinodicynodon gracile Kalandadze 1970

Extinct genus of dicynodonts

Rhinodicynodon is an extinct genus of dicynodont therapsid of the Middle Triassic (Anisian) Donguz Formation of Russia.

== See also ==
- List of therapsids
