= Rhadiodromus =

Rhadiodromus Temporal range: Anisian ~247–242 Ma

Scientific classification
- Domain: Eukaryota
- Kingdom: Animalia
- Phylum: Chordata
- Clade: Synapsida
- Clade: Therapsida
- Suborder: †Anomodontia
- Clade: †Dicynodontia
- Family: †Kannemeyeriidae
- Genus: †Rhadiodromus; Efremov, 1951

Species
- R. klimovi; R. mariae

Extinct genus of dicynodonts

Rhadiodromus is a genus of dicynodont from Middle Triassic (Anisian) Donguz Formation of Russia.
