= Angonisaurus =

Angonisaurus Temporal range: Anisian ~247–242 Ma

Scientific classification
- Domain: Eukaryota
- Kingdom: Animalia
- Phylum: Chordata
- Clade: Synapsida
- Clade: Therapsida
- Suborder: †Anomodontia
- Clade: †Dicynodontia
- Genus: †Angonisaurus; Cox & Li, 1983
- Species: †A. cruickshanki

Binomial name
- †Angonisaurus cruickshanki Cox and Li, 1983

Extinct genus of dicynodonts

Angonisaurus is an extinct genus of kannemeyeriiform dicynodont from the Middle Triassic of Africa between 247 and 242 million years ago. Only one species, Angonisaurus cruickshanki has been assigned to this genus. This genus is thought to have been widely spread but rare in southern Gondwana. Though few in number, the fossil record of Angonisaurus cruickshanki contains multiple specimens giving it a measurable stratigraphic range. Sexually dimorphic features are found in Angonisaurus which include presence or absence of tusks and difference is size and robustness of the temporal arch and the rostral.

== Discovery and naming ==
Angonisaurus was discovered in the African Karoo Basin in 1983. Because of the lack of good lithostratigraphic marker beds, biostratigraphy has proven to be the most reliable aid for stratigraphic subdivision of this Lower–Middle Triassic succession. Angonisaurus was found in the present day locations of the towns of Sterkstroom and the Molteno. Within the area, there are three subzones, Angonisaurus are biostratigraphically constrained to the uppermost Cynognathus Assemblage Zone (subzone C).

Gondwana and Laurasia during the Triassic

Angonisaurus was named by its discoverers Cox and Li in 1983. In the name Angonisaurus, "an" means without, and "gon" means angle(d) or knee, which refers to the erect hind limbs with forelimbs that bend at the elbow.

== Description ==
=== Specimens ===
Autapomorphies of Angonisaurus have not been identified, but the taxon can be differentiated from all other Triassic dicynodonts by the combination of characters displayed by the intertemporal bar (no strong break in slope between intertemporal bar and frontals; postorbitals do not extend the full length of the intertemporal bar to reach the squamosals; parietals widely exposed in dorsal view with well-developed midline groove; interparietal makes a moderate contribution to skull roof and meets the parietals along an interdigitated suture). There are 7 localities in South Africa in which Angonisaurus fossils were uncovered in the Cynognathus assemblage zone.

=== Characteristics ===
Kannemeyeriiform dicynodont are characterized by the following combination of characters: skull tall; caniniform process triangular in lateral view; tusks absent; interorbital skull roof wide; preparietal absent; pineal foramen located at the base of a deep, conical pit; no strong break in slope between the interorbital skull roof and the intertemporal bar; postorbitals do not extend the entire length of the intertemporal bar and do not contact the squamosals posteriorly; parietals have broad exposure on the dorsal surface of the intertemporal bar; midline groove with raised edges present on dorsal surface of parietals for at least part of the length of the intertemporal bar; interparietal makes a moderate contribution to the posterior end of the intertemporal bar and meets the parietal along an interdigitated suture; occiput broad; temporal fenestra roughly rectangular in shape; margins of squamosal robust and thickened; fossa for the origin of the M. adductor mandibulae externus lateralis relatively vertically oriented; median wall of posterior dentary sulcus raised and thickened. Autapomorphies of Angonisaurus have not been identified, but the taxon can be differentiated from all other Triassic dicynodonts by the combination of characters displayed by the intertemporal bar (no strong break in slope between intertemporal bar and frontals; postorbitals do not extend the full length of the intertemporal bar to reach the squamosals; parietals widely exposed in dorsal view with well-developed midline groove; interparietal makes a moderate contribution to skull roof and meets the parietals along an interdigitated suture); raised and thickened.

== Classification ==
Identification was based on a number of characters shared by the South African specimens and the holotype of Angonisaurus cruickshanki, including the broad occipital bone; robust squamosal; interparietal contribution to the skull roof; postorbitals that do not contact the squamosals on the skull roof, such that the parietals form a significant portion of the temporal bar; pineal foramen located within a deep conical depression; wide interorbital bar; and the triangular, tuskless caniniform process. However, there are marked differences between the South African specimens and the Tanzanian holotype, including the absence of a midline groove that extends along the entire length of the temporal bar, the absence of a dorsal margin of the occiput that overhangs the remainder of the occipital plate, and the more gracile caniniform processes in the South African specimens. Because the type of A. crucikshanki was the only known specimen of Angonisaurus at the time, Hancox and Rubidge expressed uncertainty as to whether these differences reflected a species-level distinction between South African and Tanzanian Angonisaurus, or if they stemmed from intraspecific variation, and they did not offer a species-level identification for BP/1/5530 and BP/1/5531.

== Paleobiology ==
Not much is known about Angonisaurus that distinguishes it functionally different from other herbivorous dicynodont relatives. The dicynodont skull is highly specialised, light but strong, with the synapsid temporal openings at the rear of the skull greatly enlarged to accommodate larger jaw muscles. The front of the skull and the lower jaw are generally narrow and, in all but a number of primitive forms, toothless. Instead, the front of the mouth is equipped with a horny beak, as in turtles and ceratopsian dinosaurs. Food was processed by the retraction of the lower jaw when the mouth closed, producing a powerful shearing action, which would have enabled dicynodonts to cope with tough plant material.

== See also ==
- List of therapsids
