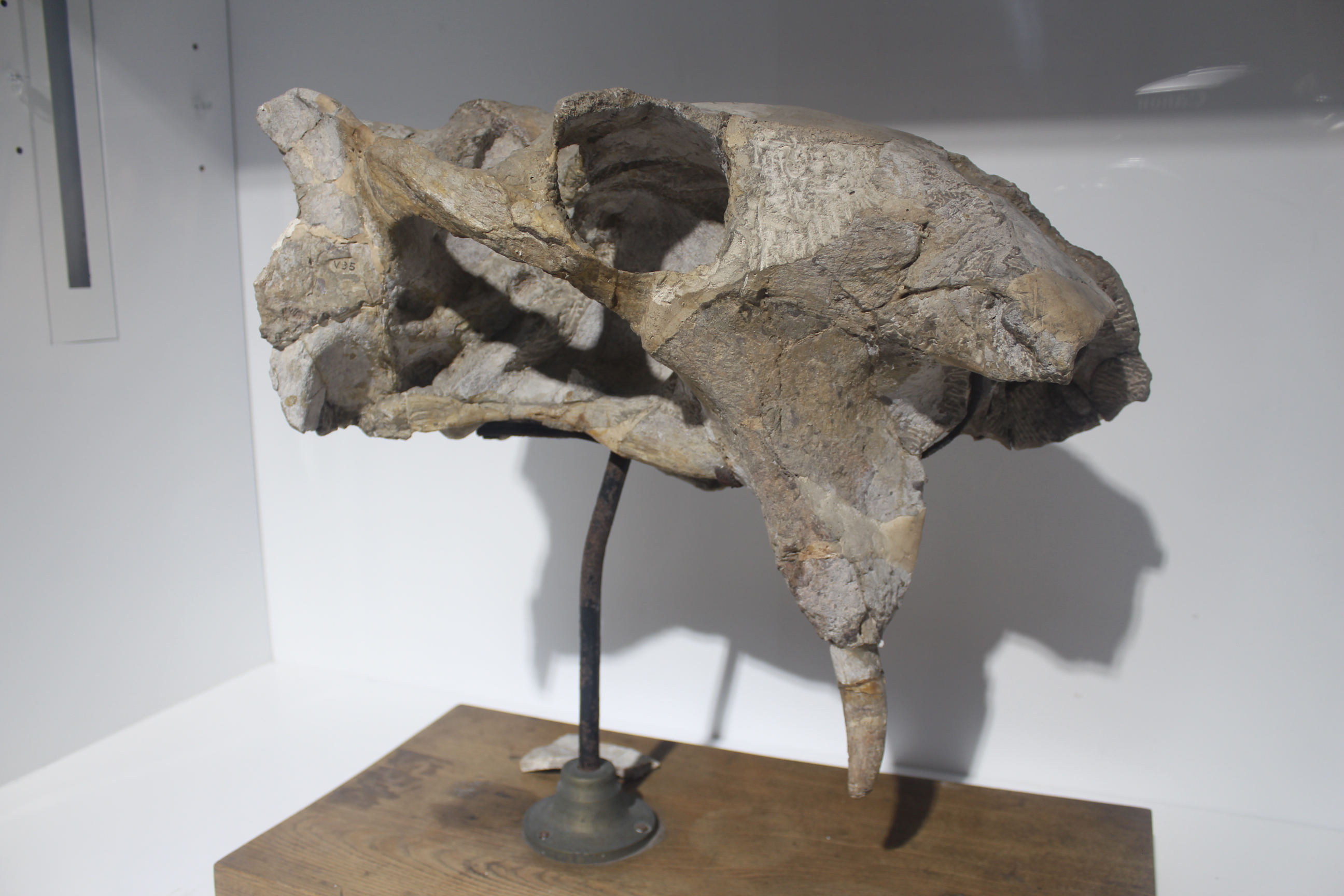
- Skull of P. youngi, Geological Museum of China

Scientific classification
- Domain: Eukaryota
- Kingdom: Animalia
- Phylum: Chordata
- Clade: Synapsida
- Clade: Therapsida
- Suborder: †Anomodontia
- Clade: †Dicynodontia
- Clade: †Kannemeyeriiformes
- Genus: †Parakannemeyeria

Type species
- Parakannemeyeria youngi

= Parakannemeyeria =

Parakannemeyeria Temporal range: Anisian ~247–242 Ma

Extinct genus of dicynodonts

Parakannemeyeria is an extinct genus of dicynodont. Fossils of the genus have been found in the Ermaying, Tongchuan and Kelamayi Formations of China.

== Gallery ==
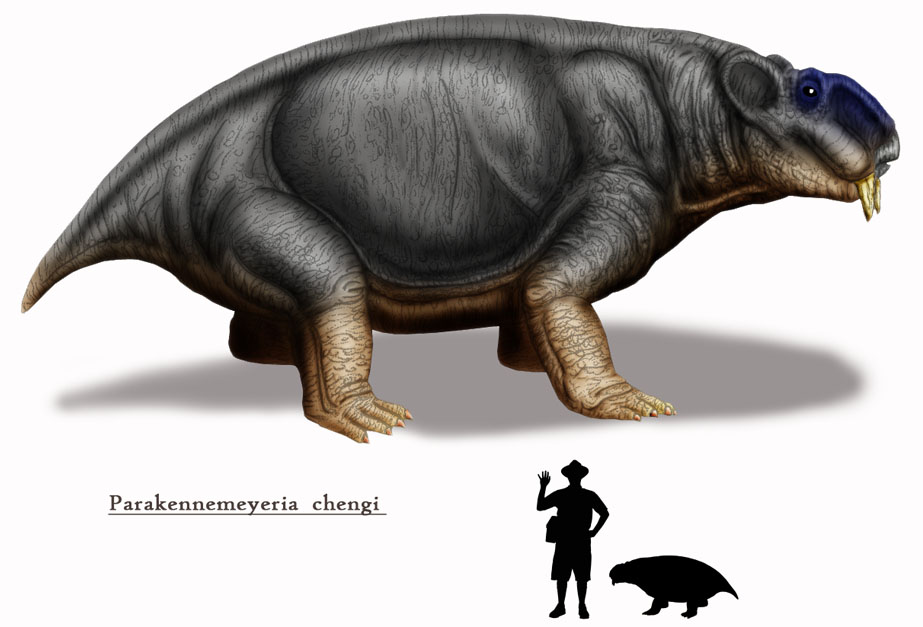
Life restoration
