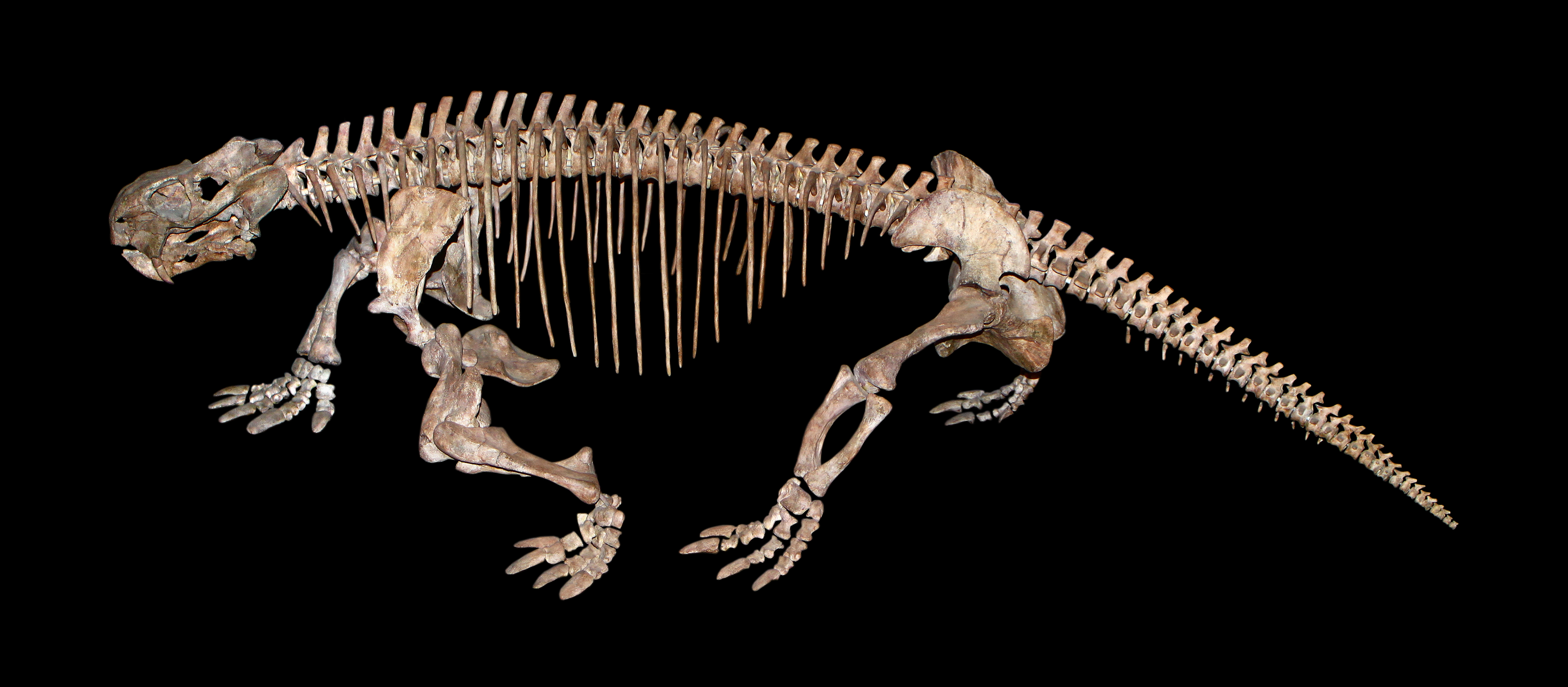
- Mounted skeleton of Tetragonias njalilus

Scientific classification
- Kingdom: Animalia
- Phylum: Chordata
- Clade: Synapsida
- Clade: Therapsida
- Clade: †Anomodontia
- Clade: †Dicynodontia
- Clade: †Kannemeyeriiformes
- Family: †Shansiodontidae; Cox, 1965

Genera
- †Rhinodicynodon; †Shansiodon; †Tetragonias; †Vinceria

= Shansiodontidae =

Shansiodontidae Temporal range: Anisian-Norian Anisian–Norian

Extinct family of dicynodonts

Shansiodontidae is a family of dicynodont therapsids.
