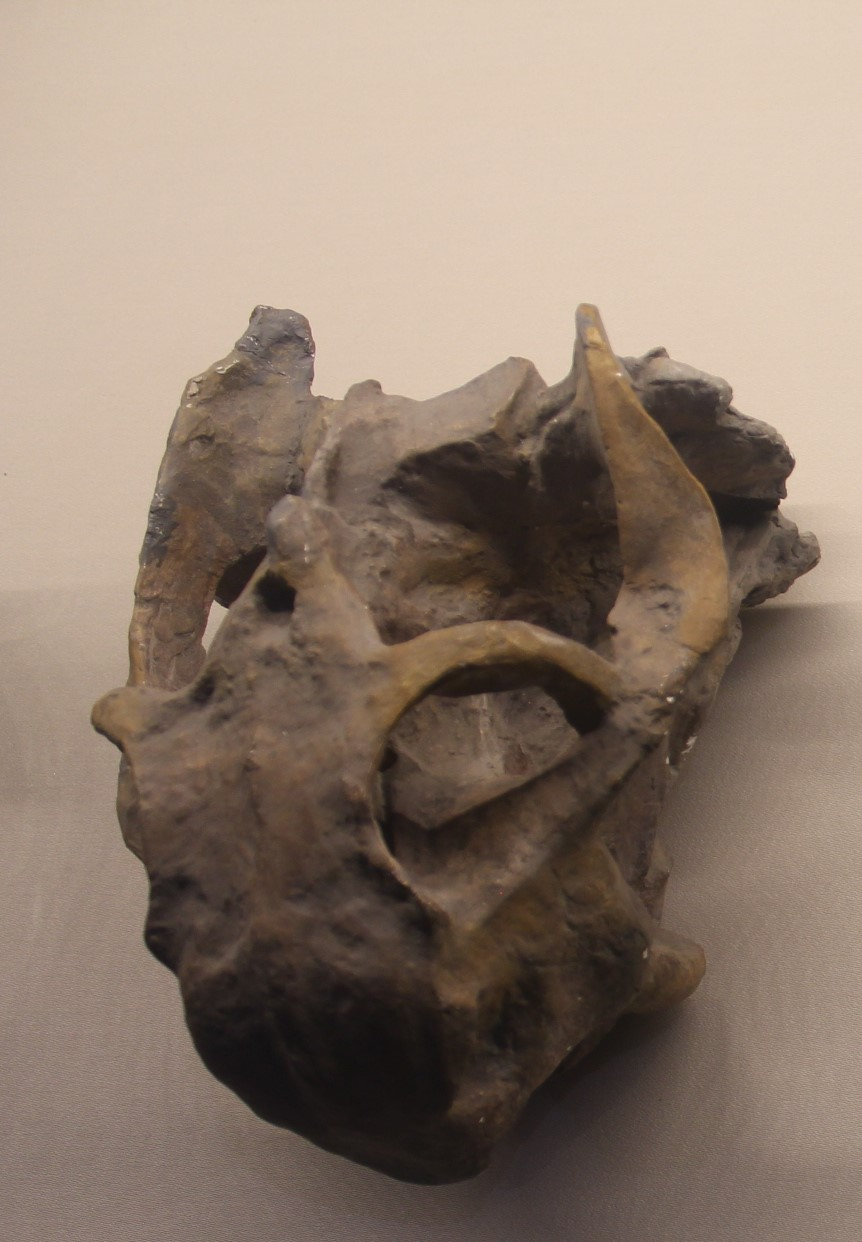
- Skull cast, Tianjin Natural History Museum

Scientific classification
- Domain: Eukaryota
- Kingdom: Animalia
- Phylum: Chordata
- Clade: Synapsida
- Clade: Therapsida
- Suborder: †Anomodontia
- Clade: †Dicynodontia
- Family: †Shansiodontidae
- Genus: †Shansiodon; Yeh, 1959

Species
- Shansiodon shaanbeiensis; Shansiodon wangi; Shansiodon wuhsiangensis; Shansiodon wupuensis

= Shansiodon =

Shansiodon Temporal range: Anisian ~247–242 Ma

Extinct genus of dicynodonts

Shansiodon is a genus of dicynodont from Middle Triassic (Anisian and Ladinian) of China and South Africa (sp. indet.).
