= Vicentino Prestes de Almeida =

Brazilian paleontologist

- Born: 1900; Chiniquá, São Pedro do Sul
- Died: October 28, 1954 (aged 53-54); São Pedro do Sul
- Scientific career
- Fields: paleontologist

Vicentino Prestes de Almeida (1900 - October 28, 1954) was a Brazilian paleontologist.

== Biography ==
Prestes was born in1900 in Chiniquá, Rio Grande do Sul, Brazil, and was a self-taught paleontologist. Beginning in 1925, he worked with many visiting paleontologists in both Santa Maria and São Pedro do Sul in the Brazilian state of Rio Grande do Sul.

Many of the fossils collected by Prestes are in museums in Porto Alegre, such as the Júlio de Castilhos Museum, the Zoobotanical Natural History Museum of Rio Grande do Sul, the Museum of Science and Technology (PUCRS) and the Museum of Paleontology Irajá Damiani Pinto.

Friedrich von Huene named the carnivorous Triassic reptile Prestosuchus chiniquensis in Prestes's honor (from Prestes and Chiniquá, his birthplace).

Prestes organized and arranged the fossils for the Instituto de Educação General Flores da Cunha and contributed considerably to the Paleorrota Geopark.

He died on October 28, 1954, in São Pedro do Sul, Brazil, aged 53 or 54.
