= Paleontological Site Chiniquá =

Chiniquá Paleontological Site
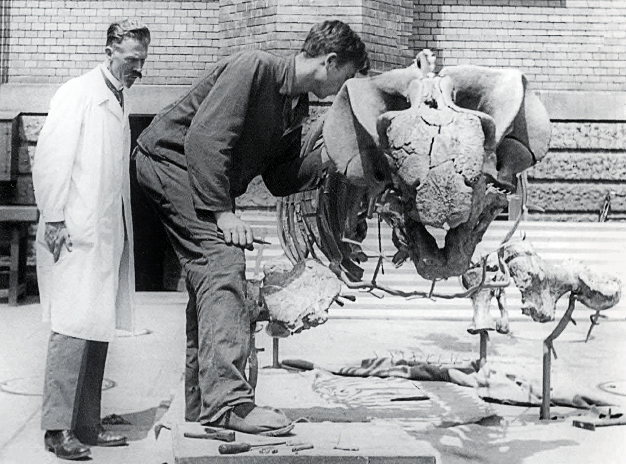
- Mounted skeleton of Stahleckeria, a dicynodont therapsid recovered from Chiniquá in the 1920s by German paleontologists, in the University of Tübingen (1935).
- Interactive map of Chiniquá; Paleontological Site
- Location: Paleorrota Geopark; São Pedro do Sul, Rio Grande do Sul, Brazil
- Coordinates: 29°39′21″S 54°25′38″W

The Palaeontological Site Chiniquá is located in the Brazilian municipality of São Pedro do Sul, Rio Grande do Sul, along highway BR-287, about 70 kilometers west of the city of Santa Maria. The site occupies an area of about 250 hectares and is part of the geopark of paleorrota. It yielded fossils of Middle Triassic (Ladinian) age.

== History ==
The Paleontological Site Chiniquá was discovered in the early 20th century, by researcher Antero de Almeida.

Historically Chiniquá is one of the most important paleontological sites in Brazil. Researchers collected fossil in the local, that drew the attention of international researchers who later visited the region. These local researchers shaped the paleontological research in the region and Brazil. For all these contributions and historical factors, Chiniquá is now known internationally.

In 1925, the German paleontologist Dr. Bruno von Freyberg, University of Halle-Wittenberg, visited the site and ended up influencing Vicentino Prestes de Almeida, a surveyor who would learn how to collect fossils. In 1910, Vincentino, was born in Chiniquá, when the site was then a district of Santa Maria, became self-taught on the subject and their findings had great influence at the coming of Von Huene for the region. Prestosuchus is named after a Vicentino Prestes de Almeida given by Von Huene.

In 1927, the Geologist Löfgren Alex would come to Chiniquá, who is assisted by Atílio Munari.

In 1928 comes the German Friedrich von Huene, accompanied by Dr. Rudolf Stahlecker. They visited the site for two months, then had to travel 70 kilometers to Santa Maria taking tons of fossils, in carts drawn by oxen. Many fossils collected, stay at the University of Tübingen, Germany. During this period had been staying at the home of Abel Luiz da Silva Flores (Belo Flores).

In 1965, Romeu Beltrão visited Chiniquá, and talked with Gomercindo Ilha Flores and José Francisco Flores, local residents, who had helped in the collection of Stahleckeria potens by Von Huene.

In 1959, an expedition formed by Llewellyn Ivor Price, Edwin Harris Colbert, Carlos de Paula Couto, Fausto Luís de Souza Cunha and Theodore, they collected fossils in Chiniquá.

From 1976 to 1984, priest Daniel Cargnin, was pastor of Mata City and began collecting fossils in the region.

== Researchers who were at the site ==
- Antero de Almeida, (1901).
- Vicentino Prestes de Almeida
- Friedrich von Huene (1928).
- Rudolf Stahlecker (1928).
- Atílio Munari
- Llewellyn Ivor Price
- Edwin Harris Colbert
- Daniel Cargnin.
- Carlos de Paula Couto
- Romeu Beltrão
- Theodore E. White
- Bruno von Freyberg
- Alex Löfgren
- Fausto Luís de Souza Cunha

== Fauna found ==
- Prestosuchus chiniquensis
- Dinodontosaurus
- Chiniquodon
- Stahleckeria

== Tourism paleontological ==

Historically this is the second location where fossils were found in the Rio Grande do Sul, in the Geopark Paleorrota. Great researchers have gone through this site and helped form the Brazilian paleontology.

The place is abandoned, no signs, no panels telling the history of the site, without replication of the animals found there and no statues of the researchers. The site is known internationally for its outstanding contributions and is in a rural area on the edge of the highway BR-287, with great handling car. There is no project to make the place a tourist spot. Lack of responsibility and political involvement are on the part of municipal and state authorities.

== See also ==
- Paleontology
