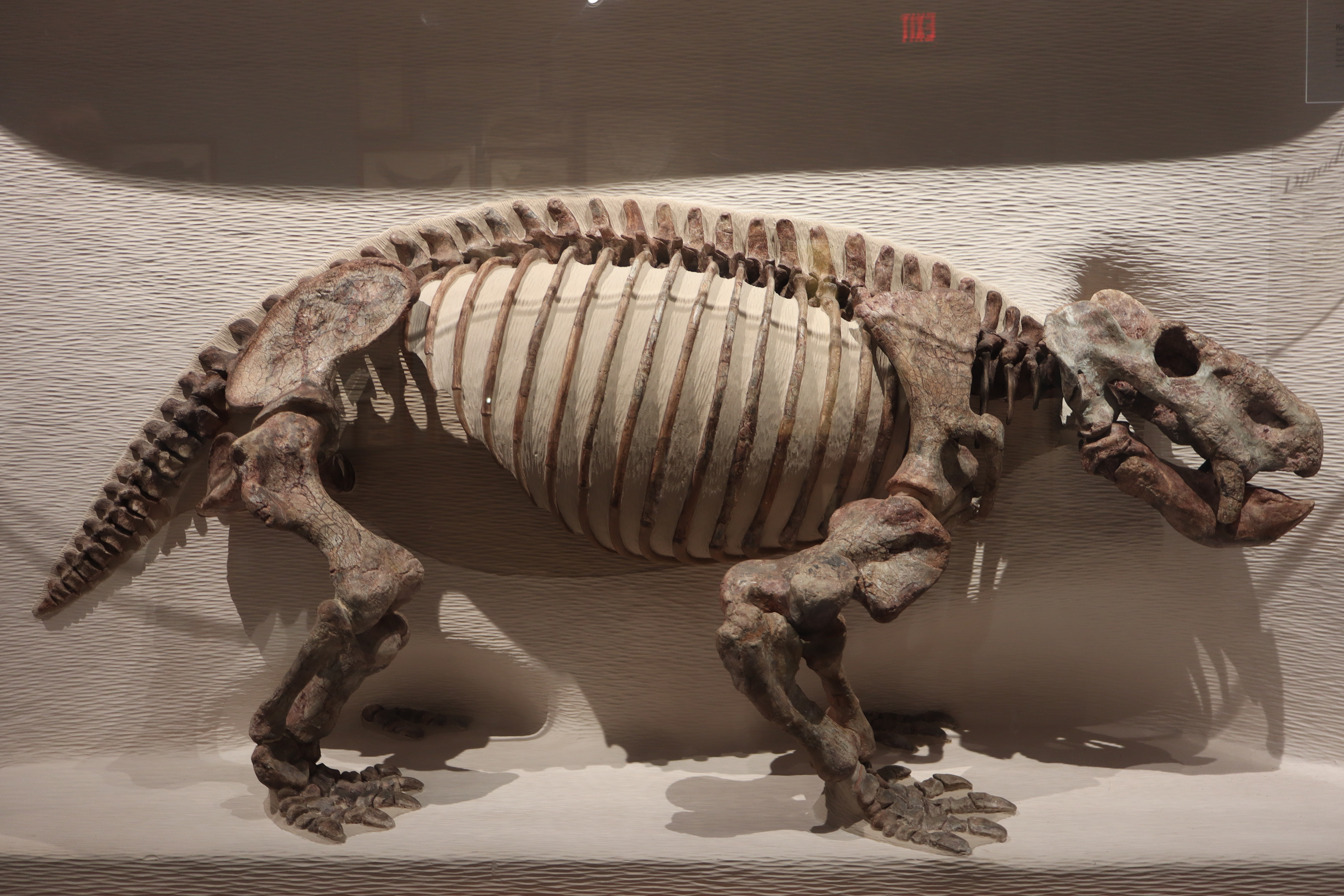
- Mounted Dinodontosaurus tener skeleton
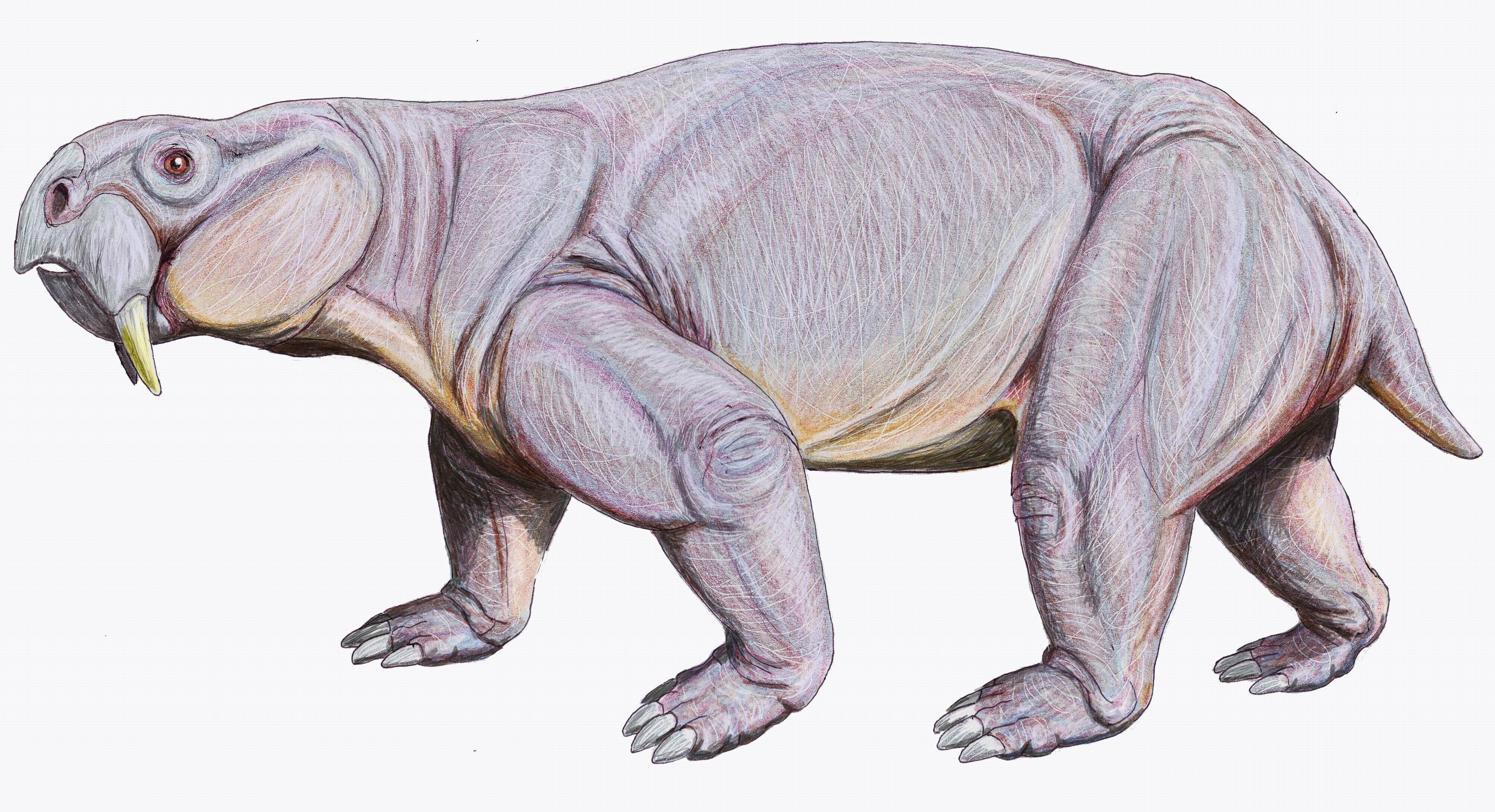
- D. tener illustration

Scientific classification
- Kingdom: Animalia
- Phylum: Chordata
- Clade: Synapsida
- Clade: Therapsida
- Clade: †Anomodontia
- Clade: †Dicynodontia
- Clade: †Kannemeyeriiformes
- Genus: †Dinodontosaurus; Romer, 1943

Type species
- †Dinodontosaurus oliveirai Romer, 1943 [Junior synonym]

Species
- D. brevirostris Cox, 1968; D. isiyavamanda George et al., 2026; D. tener (Huene, 1935); D. turpior (Huene, 1935) [nomen dubium]

Synonyms
- Genus synonymy: Chanaria Cox, 1968; Diodontosaurus Tupí-Caldas, 1936 [nomen suppressum]; Species synonymy: Synonyms of D. brevirostris: Chanaria platyceps Cox, 1968; D. platygnathus Cox, 1968; Synonyms of D. tener: Diodontosaurus pedroanum Tupí-Caldas, 1936; D. oliveirai Romer, 1943

= Dinodontosaurus =

Dinodontosaurus Temporal range: Mid-Late Triassic ~242–229 Ma

Extinct genus of dicynodonts

Dinodontosaurus (meaning "terrible-toothed lizard") is a genus of dicynodont therapsid which lived in South America (Brazil and Argentina) and Southern Africa (Tanzania) from the Middle Triassic to the Upper Triassic. It was medium to large sized dicynodont with a skull up to 40 centimetres (16 in) long and had a beak corneum. At least three species belong to this genus: D. brevirostris, D. tener, and D. isiyavamanda. There is a fourth species that is a nomen dubium, D. turpior.

== Taxonomy ==
=== Species ===
- Dinodontosaurus tener is the most common species of dicynodont that existed in the Middle Triassic, and more common in the fossil layers that age in Rio Grande do Sul, in Rota Paleontológica. They are found mainly in the Paleontological Site Chiniquá in São Pedro do Sul and Candelária, where a group of ten pups were found together, demonstrating that these animals had strategies for coexistence in a group and caring for their offspring. Diodontosaurus pedroanum Tupi-Caldas, 1936 and Dinodontosaurus oliveirai, Romer 1943 are synonyms.
- Dinodontosaurus brevirostris is known from skeleton remains and coprolites representing a shared latrine found in Argentina. Chanaria platyceps Cox, 1968 and Dinodontosaurus platygnathus are synonyms.
- Dinodontosaurus isiyavamanda is known from fossils found in the Manda Beds of Tanzania, particularly a large partial skeleton. The species name translates to "country of the Wamanda", honoring the unrecorded Wamanda people who helped to recover the original skeleton. This fossil was first named as "Ruhuhuungualasaurus croucheri" in a master's thesis by Larkin (1994), though this name is a nomen nudum, since it was never formally published in a scientific journal. It would finally be named as a new species of Dinodontosaurus by George et al. (2026).

=== Phylogeny ===
Dinodontosaurus in a cladogram from Szczygielski & Sulej (2023):

- Kannemeyeriiformes
  - Shansiodontidae
    - Rhinodicynodon
    - - Tetragonias
      - - Shansiodon
        - Vinceria
  - - Dinodontosaurus
    - - "Kannemeyeriidae"
        - Dolichuranus
        - - - - Acratophorus
              - - Rabidosaurus
                - Wadiasaurus
            - - Sinokannemeyeria
              - - Parakannemeyeria
                - Xiyukannemeyeria
          - - Rhadiodromus
            - - Shaanbeikannemeyeria
              - - Kannemeyeria
                - - Rechnisaurus
                  - Uralokannemeyeria
      - - Angonisaurus
        - - Woznikella
          - Stahleckeriidae

== Description ==
Life restoration of D. isiyavamanda by Gabriel Ugueto

Dinodontosaurus was a medium to larger sized dicynodont. It has a skull length of up to 40 centimetres (16 in). It possessed both tusks that were notably elongated and curved and beak corneum. Specimens of Dinodontosaurus tener has a high amount of morphological variability among known specimens. While some of this variation is partially due to taphonomic alterations to the skeletons, this variation is potentially due to intraspecific or even interspecific variation.

== Paleoecology ==
Dinodontosaurus is one of the most common tetrapod taxon that lived during the Middle Triassic being more common in fossil layers from the Rio Grande do Sul and Santa Maria Supersequence.

Coprolites (fossilized dung) from the Chañares Formation that have been attributed to Dinodontosaurus suggest that it had a broad diet of low-lying plants.

Dinodontosaurus tener bonebeds in Brazil appear to show evidence of gregariousness (group-living) and age segregation, since each bonebed accumulated quickly and preserves individuals of the same age and taphonomic condition.

== Gallery ==
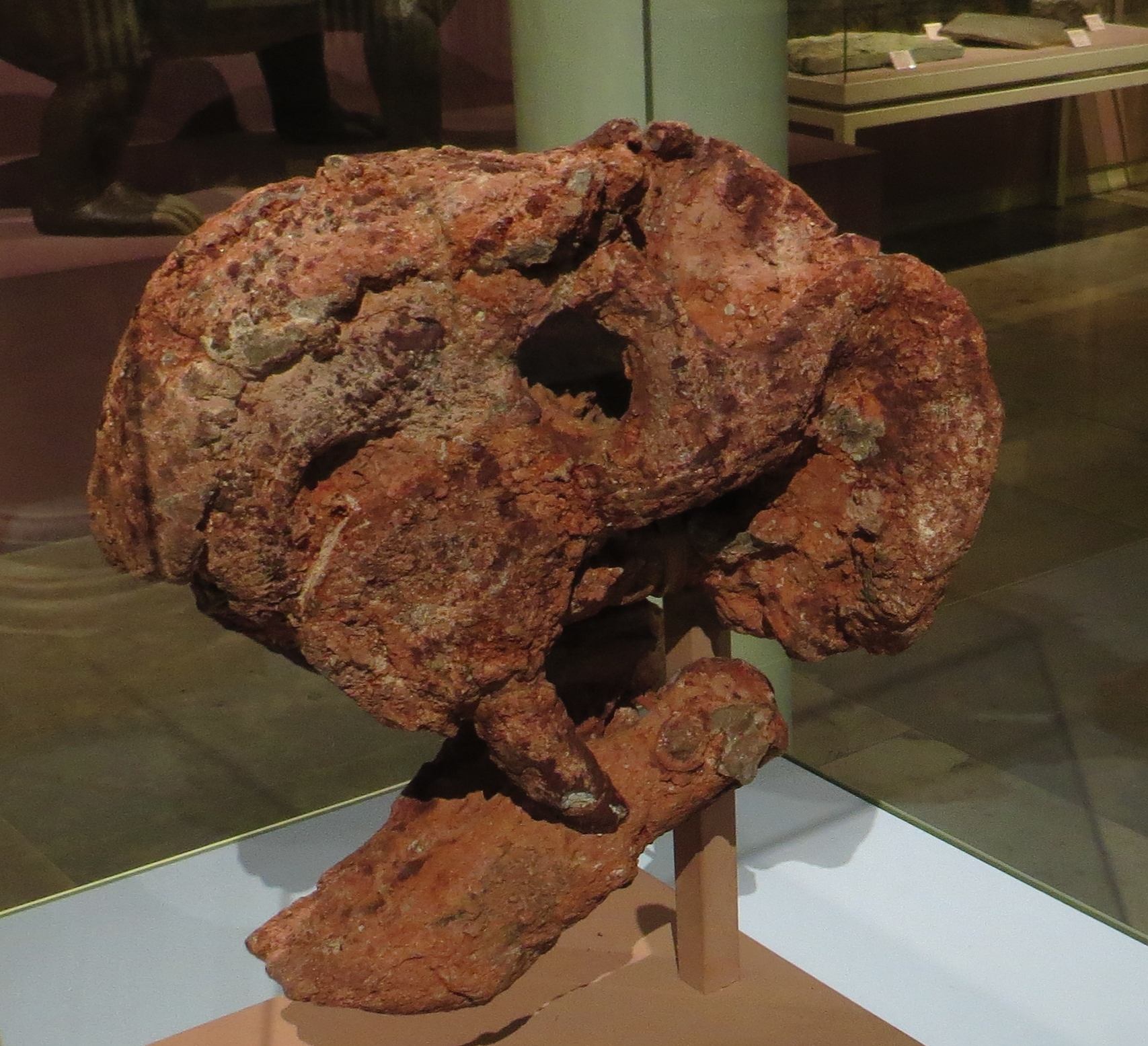
Skull (side)

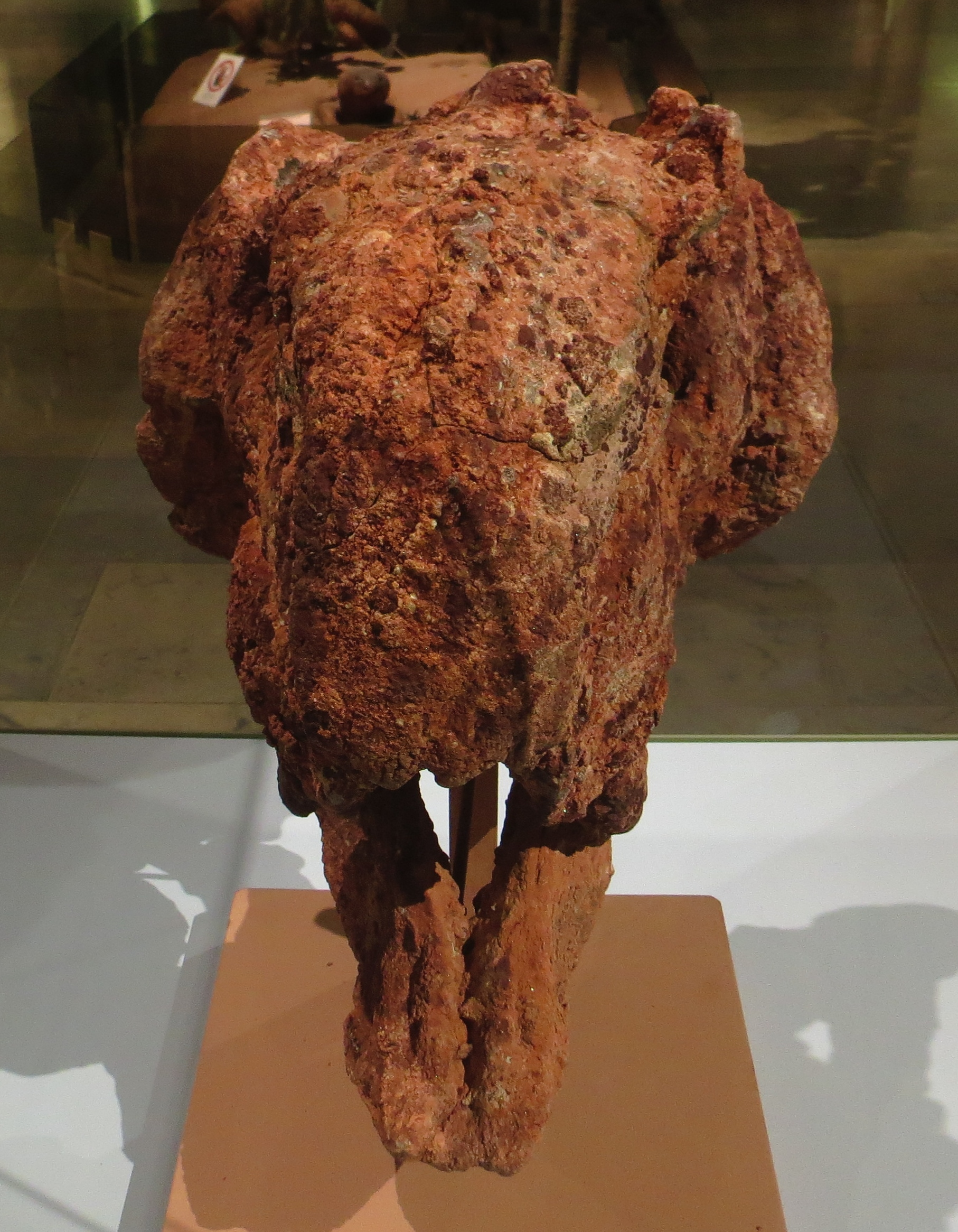
Skull (front)

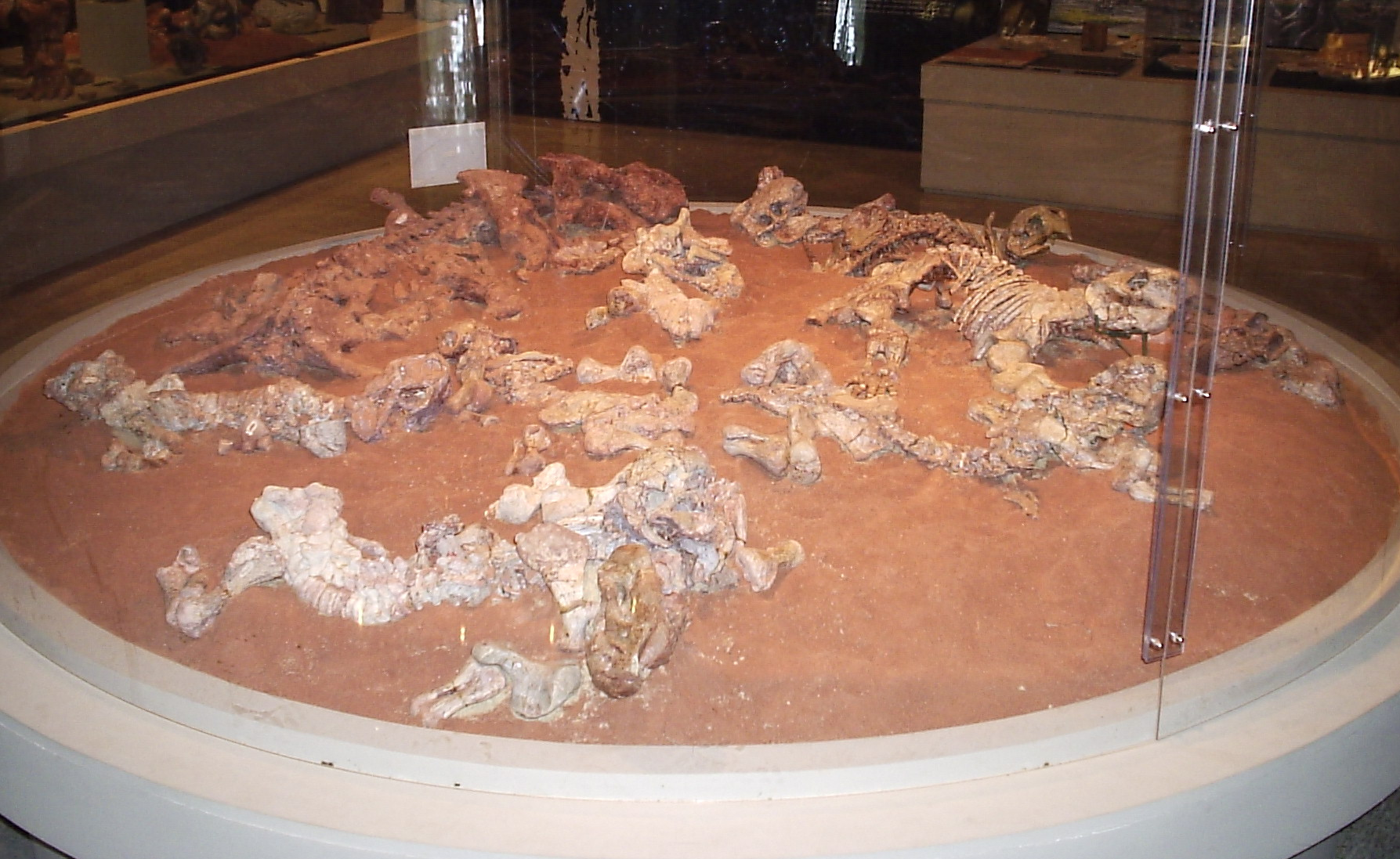
D. tener juveniles

Partial cranium of D. isiyavamanda

Mandible of D. isiyavamanda
