= Sanctipaulus mendesi =

Sanctipaulus mendesi Temporal range: Triassic

Scientific classification
- Kingdom: Animalia
- Phylum: Arthropoda
- Class: Insecta
- Order: Trichoptera
- Family: incertae sedis
- Genus: Sanctipaulus Pinto, 1956
- Species: S. mendesi

Binomial name
- Sanctipaulus mendesi Pinto, 1956

Species of caddisfly

Sanctipaulus mendesi is a species of fossil caddisfly, known from a single specimen. It was found in the Geopark of Paleorrota in Santa Maria Formation in rocks dating from the Triassic. It was found in 1955 in a shipment made by Irajá Damiani Pinto.

== Morphology ==
The specimen consists of only one wing. It was initially classified as Derbidae (Auchenorrhyncha), but was subsequently reclassified.
