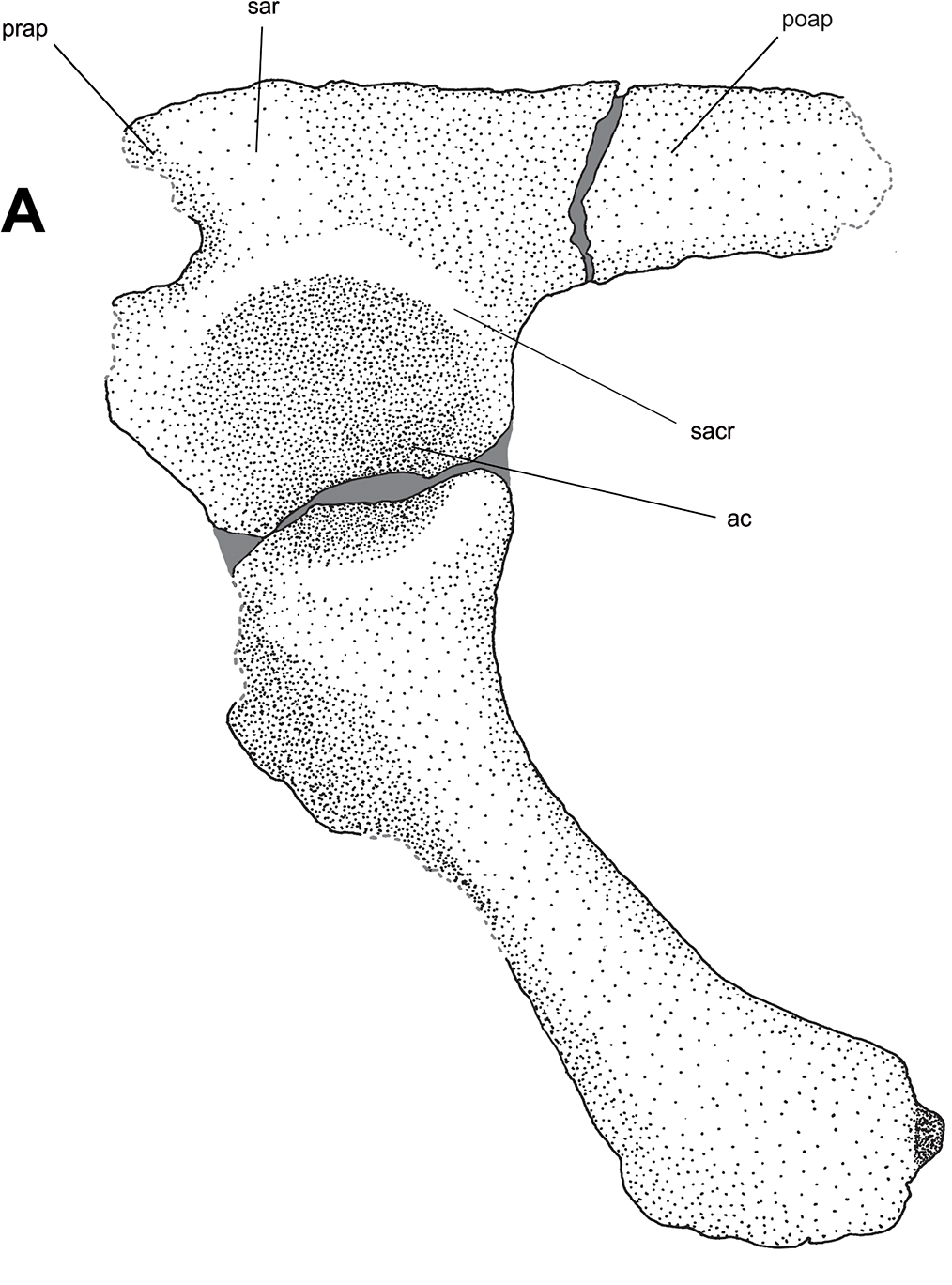
- Holotype pelvis of D. santacruzensis
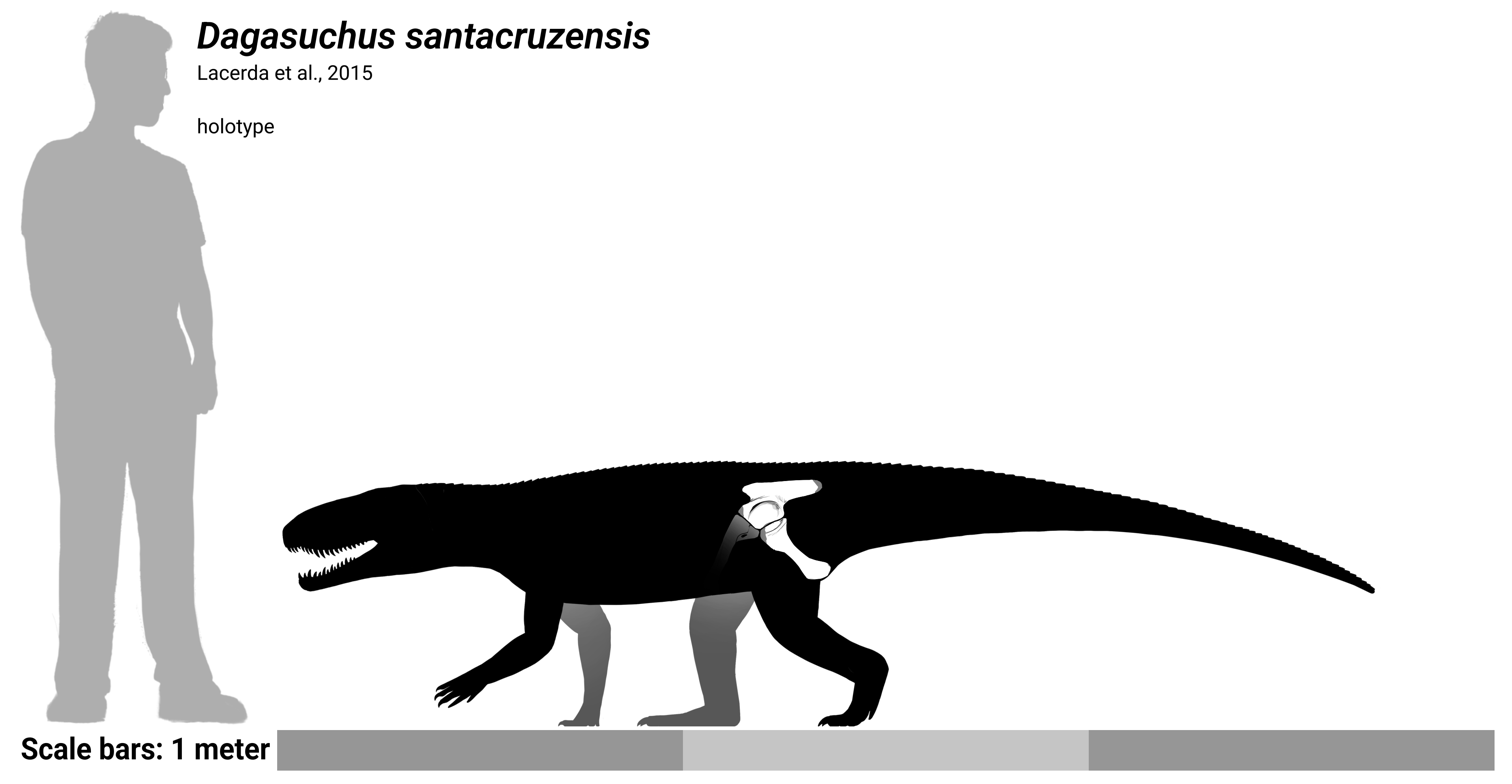
- Size comparison

Scientific classification
- Kingdom: Animalia
- Phylum: Chordata
- Class: Reptilia
- Clade: Pseudosuchia
- Clade: Loricata
- Genus: †Dagasuchus; Lacerda et al., 2015

Type species
- †Dagasuchus santacruzensis Lacerda et al., 2015

= Dagasuchus =

Dagasuchus Temporal range: Carnian ~236–233 Ma

Extinct genus of reptiles

Dagasuchus is an extinct genus of pseudosuchian archosaur from the Late Triassic (Carnian) of Rio Grande do Sul, Brazil, represented by the type species Dagasuchus santacruzensis. D. santacruzensis was named in 2015 on the basis of specimen UFRGS-PV-1244-T and UFRGS-PV-1245-T, a partial hip (one ilium and a pair of ischia) found in an exposure of the Santa Maria Formation in the Paraná Basin, near the city of Santa Cruz do Sul. Dagasuchus is an early member of a large evolutionary group called Loricata, which originated in the Triassic and includes modern crocodylians and their ancestors. Features of its hip closely resemble those of other early loricatans such as Stagonosuchus and Saurosuchus. Dagasuchus is notable for being the first loricatan found in the Santacruzodon assemblage zone of the Santa Maria Formation; previously loricatans were only known from the older Dinodontosaurus assemblage zone and the younger Hyperodapedon assemblage zone within the Santa Maria Formation, meaning that Dagasuchus fills in a gap in the fossil record of the group.
