= Romeu Beltrão =

Brazilian physician, educator, historian and paleontologist

- Born: 1913; Santa Maria, Rio Grande do Sul
- Died: 1977 (aged 63–64); Santa Maria, Rio Grande do Sul
- Scientific career
- Fields: Paleontologist, Botany and Medical
- Workplaces: Universidade Federal de Santa Maria

Romeu Beltrão (1913–1977), was a Brazilian physician, educator, historian and paleontologist. He was born and died in Santa Maria, Rio Grande do Sul, Brazil.

== Biography ==
In 1920, at the age of seven, Beltrão entered the gymnasium (secondary school) at the College of Santa Maria. At fifteen, went to study at the Medical School of Porto Alegre. After graduating in medicine in December 1934, he returned home to Santa Maria. But by February 1935, he had moved to São Pedro do Sul, to practice medicine. While there he courted and married his wife, Nilza Niederauer Alvares, as well as writing opinion pieces for the local newspaper. But he missed the intellectual and cultural life of Santa Maria, so in 1937 he again returned home, where he devoted himself to medicine and teaching. In 1938 he became a Professor of Pharmaceutical Botany at the Universidade Federal de Santa Maria.

Beltrão was strongly influenced by Llewellyn Ivor Price, and he undertook an intense survey of the paleontological finds from in and around Santa Maria. By 1951, he himself was actively engaged in paleontological excavations in the region. And in 1958, he published the book Cronologia Histórica de Santa Maria e do extinto município de São Martinho which included the history of paleontology in the Paleorrota area from 1787 to 1930. He abandoned his planned second volume which would have brought the history up to about 1960, and instead published his translation of Friedrich von Huene's paleontological work about Santa Maria, as well as a biography of Colonel João Niederauer Sobrinho (1827–1868) a hero of the Paraguayan War. He continued to write for the local newspaper and compiled a geographical dictionary of the Santa Maria municipality, which was never published.

== Honors ==
A residential street in Canoas was named "Rua Romeu Beltrão" in his honor.
