= São Pedro do Sul =

São Pedro do Sul may refer to:

- São Pedro do Sul, Portugal
- São Pedro do Sul, Rio Grande do Sul, Brazil
