= Candelária Formation, Paraná Basin =

Sedimentary formation in Brazil

Candelária Formation
- Stratigraphic range: Late Carnian (Tuvalian); ~231.4–222 Ma
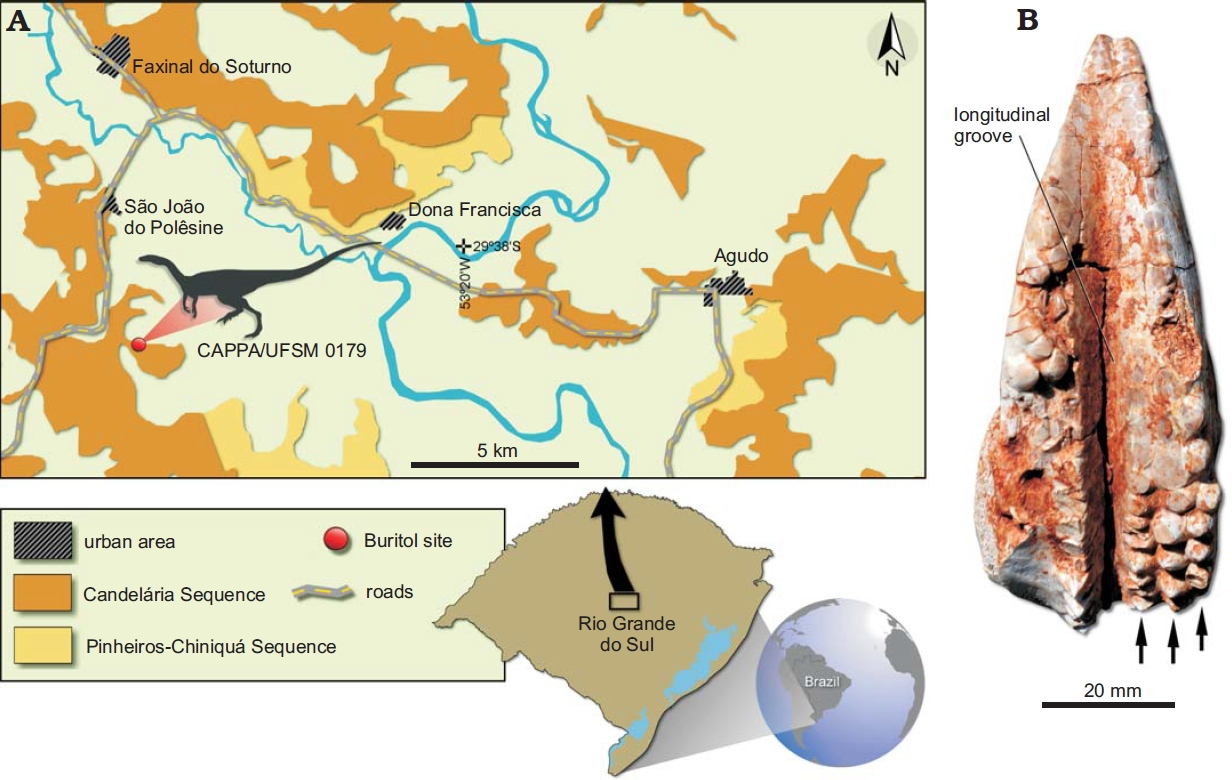
- Outcrop map of the Candelária Formation
- Type: Geological formation
- Unit of: Santa Maria Group
- Sub-units: Hyperodapedon & Riograndia Assemblage Zones
- Underlies: Caturrita Formation
- Overlies: Santa Maria Formation

Lithology
- Primary: Mudstone
- Other: Sandstone

Location
- Coordinates: 29.6°S 53.5°W
- Approximate paleocoordinates: 42.4°S 14.7°W
- Region: Rio Grande do Sul
- Country: Brazil
- Extent: Paraná Basin

Type section
- Named for: Candelária
- Candelária Formation, Paraná Basin (Brazil)

The Candelária Formation, in other literature also referred to as Candelária Sequence, is a sedimentary formation of the Santa Maria Group (also called Santa Maria Supersequence) in the Paraná Basin in Rio Grande do Sul, southeastern Brazil. The formation dates to the Carnian of the Late Triassic, locally referred to as Tuvalian, from 231.4 to approximately 222 Ma.

The Candelária Formation is composed of mudstones and sandstones deposited in a lacustrine to deltaic (distal floodplain) environment. It overlies the Santa Maria Formation and is partly overlain by and partly laterally equivalent to the Caturrita Formation. The formation comprises two Assemblage zones; the older Hyperodapedon and the younger Riograndia Assemblage Zones. Several cynodonts and other therapsids as well as early dinosaurs were found in the formation in the vicinity of Agudo.

== Description ==
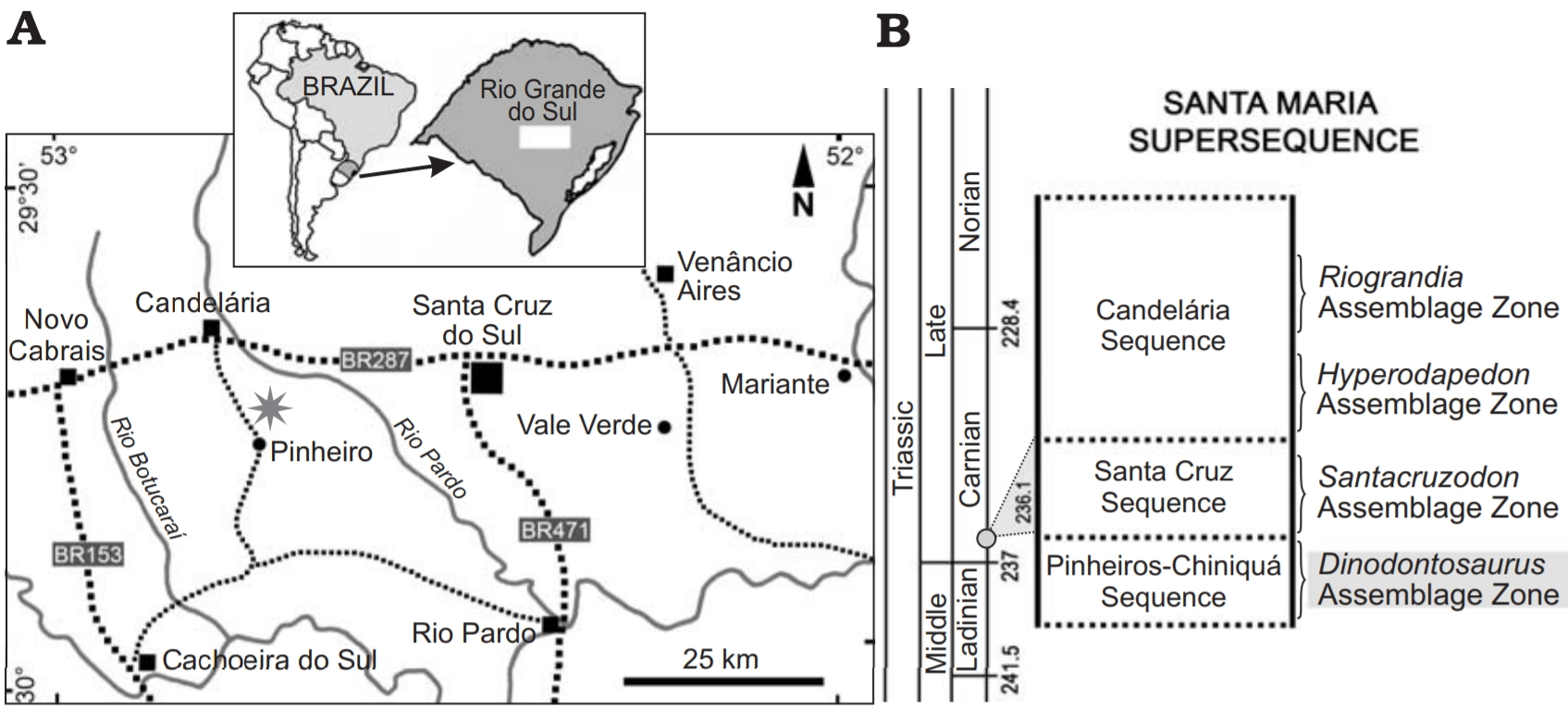
Candelária Sequence in the Paraná Basin

The Candelária Formation or Sequence corresponds to a third-order sequence placed in the Santa Maria Supersequence. The basal portion of the formation consists of a coarsening-upward succession that begins with red mudstones, interbedded with small-scale trough cross-bedded sandstone lenses. Rhythmites and sigmoidal massive to climbing cross-laminated sandstone bodies are also present. This facies association is interpreted as a lacustrine to deltaic (distal floodplain) depositional environment in a humid climate. The formation contains the Hyperodapedon and Riograndia Assemblage Zones.

The red beds are divided into a non-fossiliferous portion at the base, and an upper fossiliferous unit. Coprolites and putative rhizoliths are present. A light-colored cross-bedded sandstone also occurs at the top of the formation and represents a river channel. It is delimited by an erosive contact with the underlying red beds.

The Candelária Formation is considered a local equivalent of the Caturrita Formation, which it partly underlies. It overlies the Santa Maria Formation. The formation is correlated with the Ischigualasto Formation of the Ischigualasto-Villa Unión Basin in northwestern Argentina.

== Basin history ==
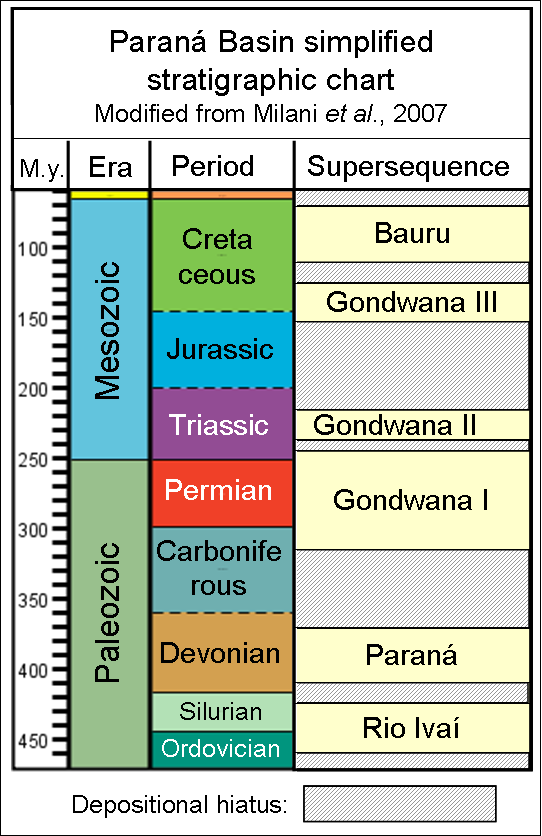
Stratigraphic chart of the Paraná Basin, with the Candelária Formation belonging to the Gondwana II Supersequence

The megaregional Paraná Basin, covering an approximate area of 1,500,000 square kilometres (580,000 sq mi) in southeastern South America, was in the late Paleozoic and early Mesozoic part of Gondwana, the southern latitude area of Pangea. Before the opening of the South Atlantic, a rifting phase that started in the Jurassic, the basin was connected to the basins of present-day southern Africa. The Candelária Formation forms part of the Gondwana II Supersequence representing the onset of continental deposition in the Paraná Basin. The Triassic paleofauna of the Paraná Basin is correlated with the African faunas of the Omingonde Formation of the Waterberg Basin in Namibia, the Molteno Formation of the Karoo Basin in South Africa and the Fremouw Formation of present-day Antarctica.

== Fossil content ==
The formation has provided fossils of therapsids characteristic of the Late Triassic, as well as early dinosaurs.

Group	Fossils	Assemblage zone	Image	Notes
Dinosaurs	Erythrovenator jacuiensis			
Dinosaurs	Macrocollum itaquii			
Dinosaurs	Dinosauria indet.			
Dinosaurs	Archosauromorpha indet.			
Therapsids	Brasilitherium riograndensis	Riograndia AZ	Brasilitherium riograndensis	
Therapsids	Brasilodon quadrangularis	Riograndia AZ		
Therapsids	Botucaraitherium belarminoi	Riograndia AZ		
Therapsids	Irajatherium hernandezi	Riograndia AZ		
Therapsids	Prozostrodon brasiliensis	Hyperodapedon AZ		
Therapsids	Siriusgnathus niemeyerorum			
Therapsids	Probainognathia indet.			
Rhynchocephalians	Lanceirosphenodon ferigoloi	Riograndia AZ		
Rhynchosaurs	Hyperodapedon sp.	Hyperodapedon AZ		

== See also ==
- List of dinosaur-bearing rock formations
- Chañares Formation, fossiliferous formation of the Ischigualasto-Villa Unión Basin, Argentina
- Santa Juana Formation, contemporaneous fossiliferous formation of south-central Chile
- Molteno Formation, contemporaneous fossiliferous formation of Lesotho and South Africa
- Pebbly Arkose Formation, contemporaneous fossiliferous formation of Botswana, Zambia and Zimbabwe
- Denmark Hill Insect Bed, contemporaneous fossiliferous unit of Queensland, Australia
- Madygen Formation, contemporaneous Lagerstätte of Kyrgyzstan

== Bibliography ==
- Botha-Brink, Jennifer; Bento Soares, Marina; Martinelli, Agustín G. (2018), "Osteohistology of Late Triassic prozostrodontian cynodonts from Brazil" (PDF), PeerJ, 5029: 1–26
- Martinelli, Agustín G.; Soares, Marina Bento; De Oliveira, Téo Veiga; Rodrigues, Pablo G.; Schultz, Cesar L. (2017), "The Triassic eucynodont Candelariodon barberenai revisited and the early diversity of stem prozostrodontians" (PDF), Acta Palaeontologica Polonica, 62: 527–542, doi:10.4202/app.00344.2017
- Milani, E.J.; Melo, J.H.G.; Souza, P.A.; Fernandes, L.A.; França, A.B. (2007), "Bacia do Paraná", Cartas Estratigráficas - Boletim de Geociências da Petrobras, Rio de Janeiro, 15: 265–287
- Müller, Rodrigo T.; Pretto, Flávio A.; Stefanello, Micheli; Silva Neves, Eduardo; Dias da Silva, S. (2017), "On a dinosaur axis from one of the oldest dinosaur-bearing sites worldwide" (PDF), Acta Palaeontologica Polonica, 62: 543–548, doi:10.4202/app.00369.2017
- Pacheco, C.P.; Martinelli, A.G.; Pavanatto, A.E.B.; Soares, M.B.; Dias da Silva, S. (2018), "Prozostrodon brasiliensis, a probainognathian cynodont from the Late Triassic of Brazil: second record and improvements on its dental anatomy", Historical Biology, 30 (4): 475–485, doi:10.1080/08912963.2017.1292423, hdl:11336/94044
- Pretto, Flávio A.; Schultz, Cesar L.; Langer, Max C. (2015), "New dinosaur remains from the Late Triassic of southern Brazil (Candelária Sequence, Hyperodapedon Assemblage Zone)" (PDF), Alcheringa, 39 (2): 1–10, doi:10.1080/03115518.2015.994114
- Romo de Vivar, Paulo R.; Martinelli, Agustín G.; Schmaltz Hsiou, Annie; Bento Soares, Marina (2020), "A new rhynchocephalian from the Late Triassic of southern Brazil enhances eusphenodontian diversity", Journal of Systematic Palaeontology, 18 (13): 1103–1126, doi:10.1080/14772019.2020.1732488
- Da Rosa, Átila Augusto Stock; Faccini, Ubiratan Ferrucio (2005), "Delimitação de blocos estruturais de diferentes escalas em seqüências mezosóicas do Estado do Rio Grande do Sul: implicações bioestratigraficas", Gaea, 1: 16–25
- Soares, Marina B.; Martinelli, Agustín G.; De Oliveira, Téo V. (2014), "A new prozostrodontian cynodont (Therapsida) from the Late Triassic Riograndia Assemblage Zone (Santa Maria Supersequence) of Southern Brazil", Anais da Academia Brasileira de Ciências, 86 (4): 1673–1691, doi:10.1590/0001-3765201420140455, hdl:10183/119079, PMID 25590707
