= Institute of Geosciences of the Universidade Federal do Rio Grande do Sul =

Unit of a Brazilian university

Coordinates: 30°04′26″S 51°07′14″W

The Institute of Geosciences is a unit of instruction of the Federal University of Rio Grande do Sul (UFRGS). It includes the undergraduate courses of Geography, Geomatics Engineering, Geology. It has a department of study of vertebrate paleontology which has made great contributions to the geopark of Paleorrota.

The unit is also responsible for the maintenance of three museums, the Journal of Research in Geosciences, and post-graduate education and research.

== Departments ==
The Institute of Geosciences is composed into five departments:

- Department of Geography
- Department of Geology
- Department of Mineralogy and Petrology
- Department of Paleontology and Stratigraphy
- Department of Geodesy

== Undergraduate programs ==
The Institute of Geosciences includes three undergraduate courses: Geography, Geomatics Engineering and Geology.

== Graduate programs ==
The Institute of Geosciences maintains two graduate programs: the Graduate Program in Geography (POSGea) and in Geosciences (PPGGEO).

=== Graduate Program in Geosciences ===
The PPGEO includes four areas of focus: Stratigraphy, Marine Geology, Geochemistry and Paleontology. In total it has 275 enrolled students, of which 137 are PhD (Doctor of Philosophy) candidates and 138 Master' candidates. The program has already graduated more than 698 Master and 302 Doctors of philosophy.

== Academics and faculty ==
Both graduate programs (PPGEA and PPGEO) have achieved high standards (6 and 7 grades out of 7) according to the Brazilian Coordination of Improvement of Higher Level Personnel (CAPES).

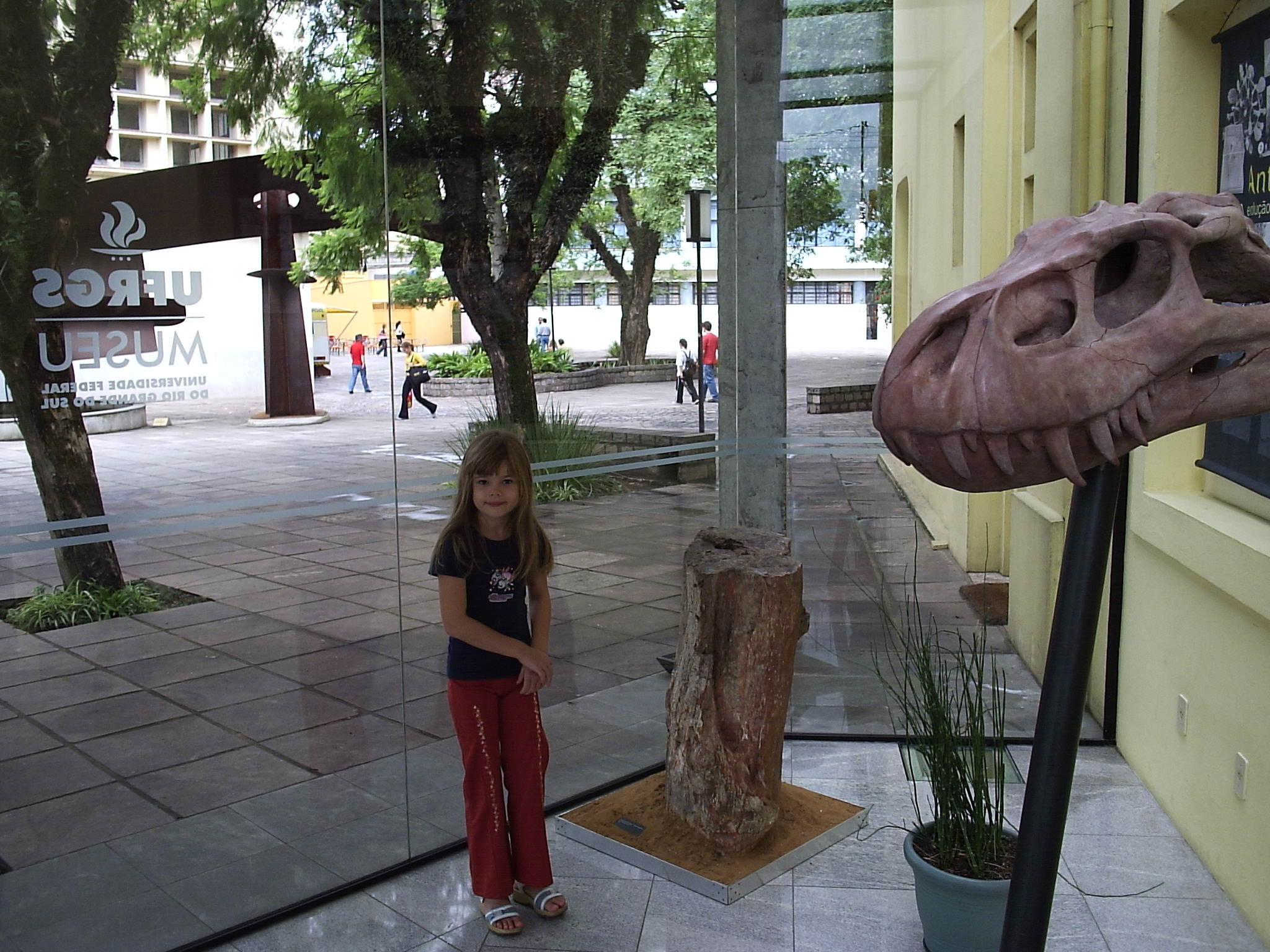
Institution's search Geopark of Paleorrota.

== Museum of Paleontology "Irajá Damiani Pinto" ==
Located in the Valley Campus (Portuguese: Campus do Vale), Avenida Bento Gonçalves in Porto Alegre, Brazil.

It is named after Irajá Damiani Pinto, professor at UFRGS.

The museum displays various fossils of the geopark of Paleorrota. In the same building, the Laboratory of Paleontology furthers the knowledge about the geopark, as many fossils are cleaned and prepared there.

== See also ==
- Paleorrota Geopark
- Porto Alegre Botanical Garden
- Museum of Science and Technology (PUCRS)
- Museum Education Gama D'Eça.
- Museum Vincente Pallotti.
- Museum Aristides Carlos Rodrigues.
- Museum Paleontologic and Archaeological Walter Ilha.
- Museum Daniel Cargnin.
