= Stahlecker =

Stahlecker is a German surname. Notable people with the surname include:

- Franz Walter Stahlecker (1900–1942), German Nazi SS general and Holocaust perpetrator
- Rudolf Stahlecker (1898–1977), German geologist and biology teacher
