= Rudolf Stahlecker =

German paleontologist

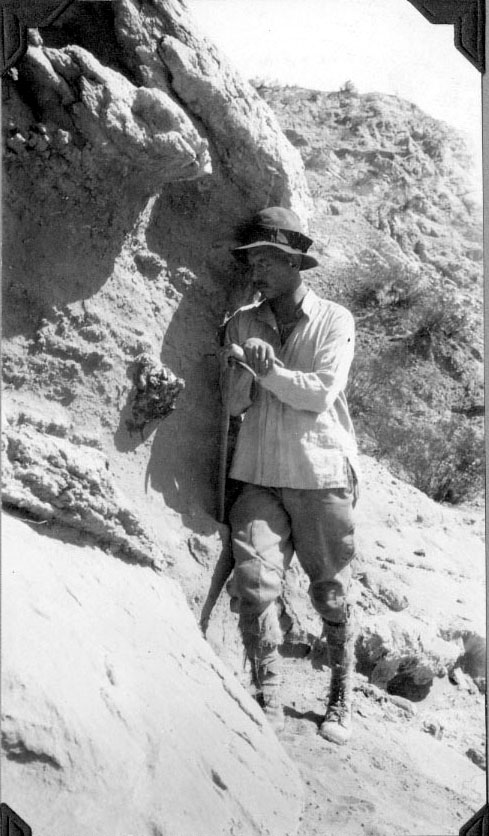
- Born: 25 November 1898; Sternenfels, German Empire
- Died: 26 October 1977 (aged 78); Urach, West Germany
- Scientific career
- Fields: paleontologist and geologist
- Workplaces: University of Tübingen
- Doctoral advisor: Friedrich von Huene

Rudolf Stahlecker (25 November 1898 in Sternenfels near Pforzheim – 26 October 1977 in Urach) was a German geologist and biology teacher.

== Biography ==
He studied with the German paleontologist Friedrich von Huene at the University of Tübingen, Germany. He participated in expeditions to collect fossils in the geopark of Paleorrota in 1928 and 1929. He also made several collections of fossils in Argentina.

In his honor, the dicynodonts Stahleckeria potens received its name. This dicynodonts was collected in Paleontological Site Chiniquá, São Pedro do Sul.

After finishing his doctorate, Stahlecker did not become a scientist but a biology teacher at a school in Stuttgart. His motto was, "the Führer wanted to teach people to think again biologically; we scientists have to be here as its first collaborators". After World War 2, he had to pause for some years during de-Nazification, thought he was not as intensely involved in the Nazi Party as his brother, Walter Stahlecker.
