= São João do Polêsine =

Municipality of Rio Grande do Sul, Brazil

- Municipality
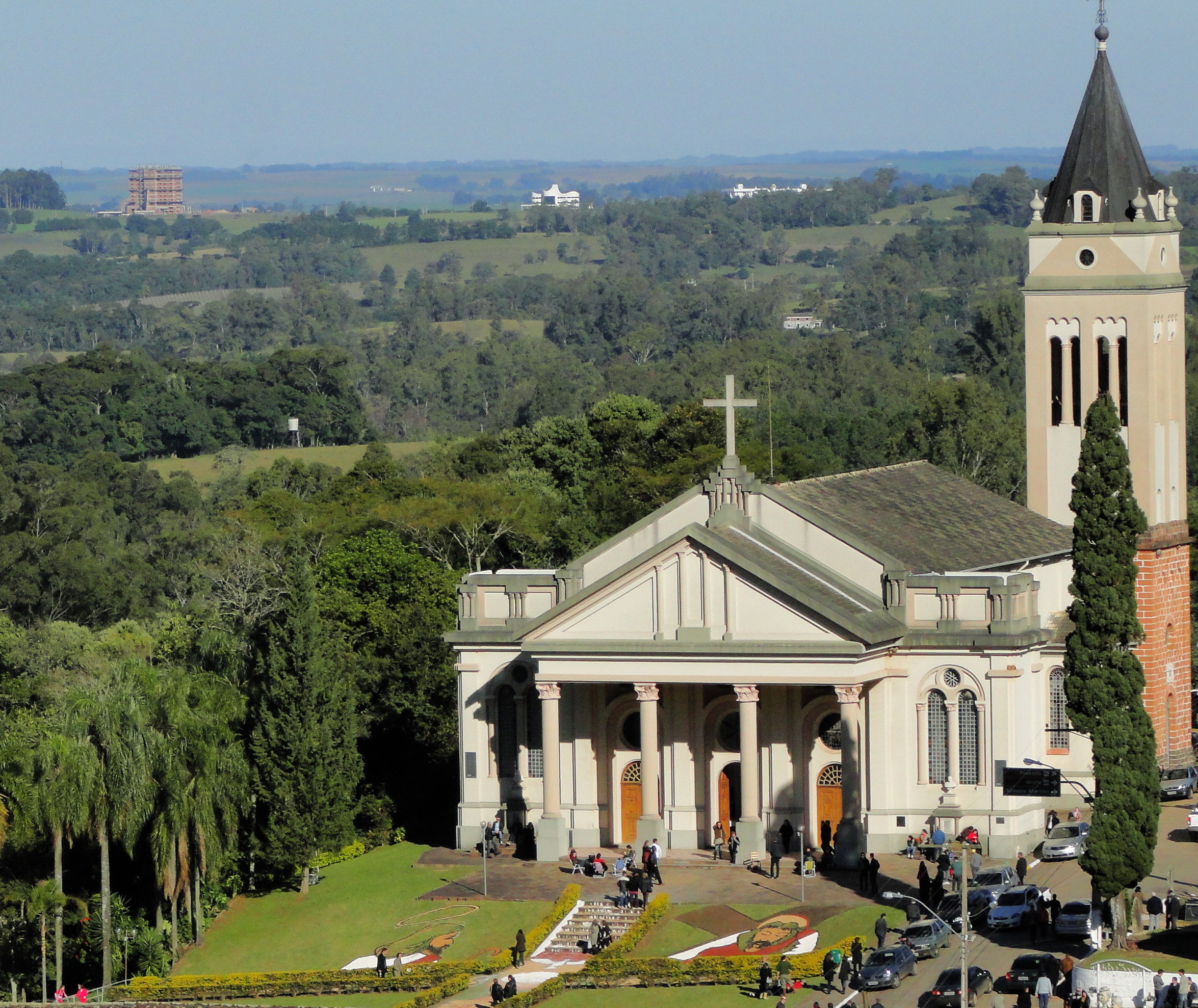
- Corpus Christi church in Vale Vêneto

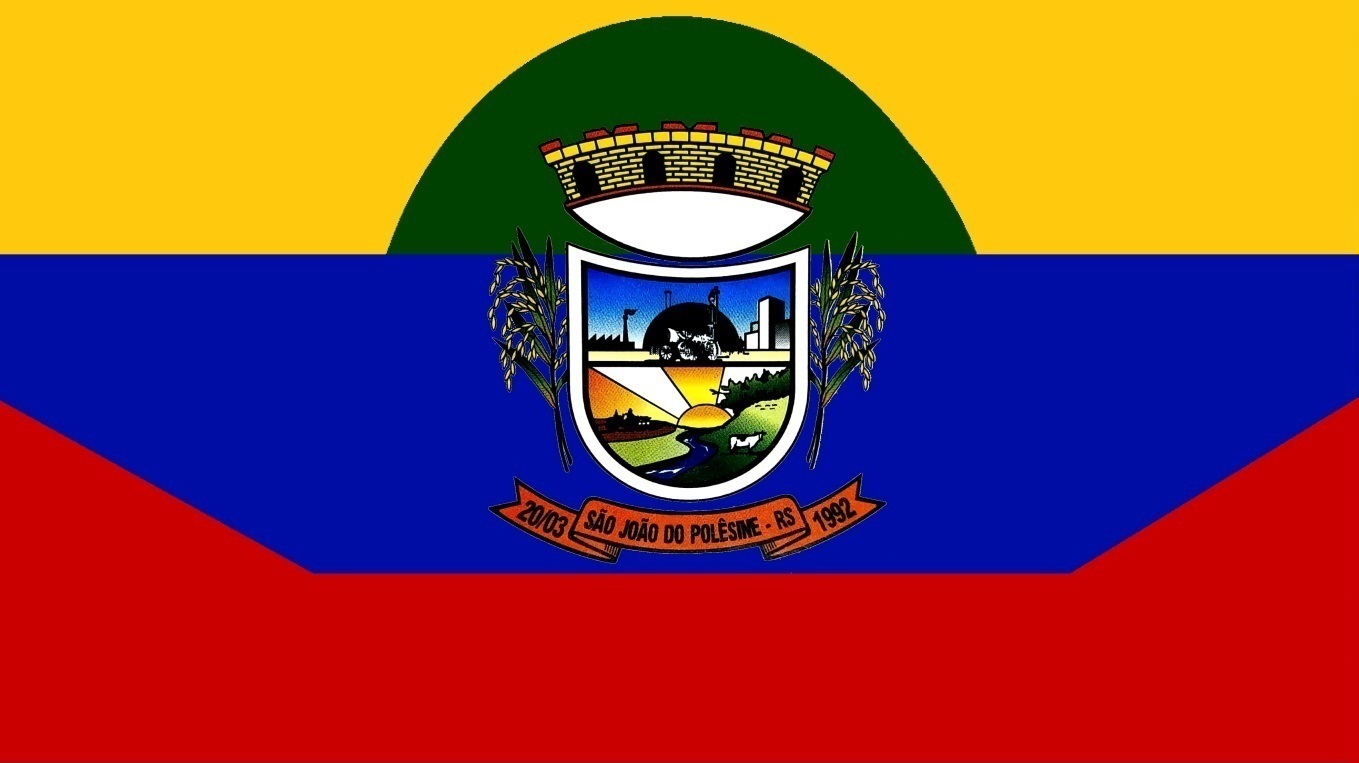
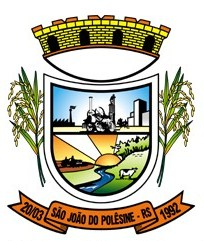
- Flag Coat of arms

- Location within Rio Grande do Sul

- Location in Brazil
- Coordinates: 29°36′50″S 53°26′45″W
- Country: Brazil
- State: Rio Grande do Sul

Population (2022)
  - Total: 2,649
- Time zone: UTC−3 (BRT)

São João do Polêsine is a municipality in the state of Rio Grande do Sul, Brazil.

== Paleontology ==
In this city there are outcrops with fossils. Sauropodomorph dinosaur Buriolestes and dinosauromorph Ixalerpeton were found in the Carnian (Late Triassic) deposits. The type species Ixalerpeton polesinensis was named after São João do Polêsine in 2016.

== See also ==
- List of municipalities in Rio Grande do Sul
