= Santa Juana Formation =

Geologic formation in Chile

- Stratigraphic range: Carnian; ~235–222 Ma
- Type: Geological formation
- Sub-units: Talcamávida-Gomero, Unihue & Quilacoya Members
- Overlies: Coastal Batholith of central Chile
- Thickness: Unknown

Lithology
- Primary: Conglomerate, sandstone, siltstone
- Other: Arkosic sandstone, mudstone, volcanic rock, anthracite

Location
- Coordinates: 37.2°S 73.0°W
- Approximate paleocoordinates: 53.8°S 39.9°W
- Region: Bío Bío Region
- Country: Chile

Type section
- Named for: Santa Juana
- Named by: Ferraris
- Year defined: 1981
- Santa Juana Formation (Chile)

Santa Juana Formation a Late Triassic (Carnian stage) sedimentary rock formation near Santa Juana in the lower course of the Biobío River in south-central Chile. Lithologies range from conglomerate sandstone, arkosic sandstone, siltstone and mudstone.

== Description ==
The sediments that consolidate into the rocks of the formation deposited in alluvial, fluvial, lacustrine and playa lake environment. Overall, the formation is rich in plant fossils.

The formation was deposited over the rocks of the Coastal Batholith of central Chile in a sedimentary basin that formed along the Gastre Fault. It has been posited that the basin developed as a rift during the early break-up of Gondwana in the Triassic.

== Fossil content ==
The following fossils have been reported from the formation:

=== Flora ===
- Asterotheca fuchsii
- A. rigbyana
- Baiera africana
- B. furcata
- Cladophlebis mendozaensis
- Dicroidium coriaceum
- D. crassinervis
- D. elongatum
- D. odontopteroides
- Dictyophyllum fuenzalidai
- D. tenuifolium
- Gleichenites quilacoyensis
- Gontriglossa reinerae
- Heidiphyllum elongatum
- Kurtziana cacheutensis
- Linguifolium lilleanum
- L. steinmannii
- Pterophyllum santajuanensis
- Rissikia media
- Saportaea dichotoma
- Sphenobaiera africana
- Sphenopteris cf. polymorpha
- Taeniopteris sp.
- Taeniopteris vittata
- Telemachus elongatus
- Thaumatopteris rothii
- Todites chilensis
- cf. Pseudoctenis fissa
- Cladophlebis sp.
- Dicroidium sp.
- Gleichenites sp.
- ?Antevsia sp.

=== Insects ===
- Bandelnielsenia chilena
- Ischichucasyne santajuanaensis
- Ademosyne sp.

=== Branchiopoda ===
- Polygrapta troncosoi
- Menucoestheria terneraensis

== See also ==
- Chañares Formation, fossiliferous formation of the Ischigualasto-Villa Unión Basin, Argentina
- Candelária Formation, contemporaneous fossiliferous formation of the Paraná Basin, Brazil
- Molteno Formation, contemporaneous fossiliferous formation of Lesotho and South Africa
- Pebbly Arkose Formation, contemporaneous fossiliferous formation of Botswana, Zambia and Zimbabwe
- Denmark Hill Insect Bed, contemporaneous fossiliferous unit of Queensland, Australia
- Madygen Formation, contemporaneous Lagerstätte of Kyrgyzstan
