= Santa Maria Formation =

Geologic formation in Brazil

- Stratigraphic range: Carnian; ~237–228 Ma
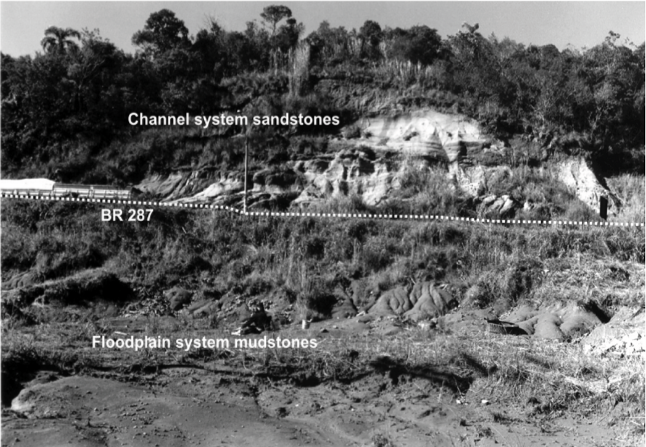
- The Schoenstatt Outcrop of the Santa Maria Formation, which is the type locality of Dagasuchus santacruzensis. Photographed around 2006.
- Type: Geological formation
- Unit of: Rosário do Sul Group
- Sub-units: Passo das Tropas & Alemoa Members
- Underlies: Caturrita Formation
- Overlies: Sanga do Cabral Formation

Location
- Coordinates: 29.695°S 53.795°W
- Region: Rio Grande do Sul
- Country: Brazil
- Extent: Paraná Basin
- Santa Maria Formation (Brazil) Santa Maria Formation (Rio Grande do Sul)

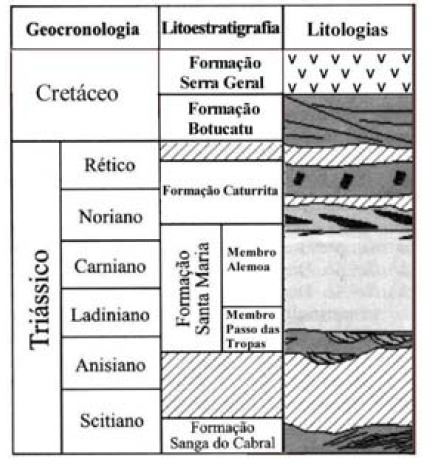
Santa Maria Formation. Source: UFSM

The Santa Maria Formation is a sedimentary rock formation found in Rio Grande do Sul, Brazil. It is primarily Carnian in age (Late Triassic), and is notable for its fossils of cynodonts, "rauisuchian" pseudosuchians, and early dinosaurs and other dinosauromorphs, including the herrerasaurid Staurikosaurus, the basal sauropodomorphs Buriolestes and Saturnalia, and the lagerpetid Ixalerpeton. The formation is named after the city of Santa Maria in the central region of Rio Grande do Sul, where outcrops were first studied.

The Santa Maria Formation makes up the majority of the Santa Maria Supersequence, which extends through the entire Late Triassic. The Santa Maria Supersequence is divided into four geological sequences, separated from each other by short unconformities. The first two of these sequences (Pinheiros-Chiniquá and Santa Cruz sequences) lie entirely within the Santa Maria Formation, while the third (the Candelária sequence) is shared with the overlying Norian-age Caturrita Formation. The fourth and youngest sequence (the Mata sequence) is equivalent to the Rhaetian-age Mata Sandstone.

The oldest sequence in the formation is the Pinheiros-Chiniquá Sequence (latest Ladinian-earliest Carnian, ~237 Ma), which is biostratigraphically equivalent to the Dinodontosaurus Assemblage Zone. It is followed by the shorter Santa Cruz Sequence (early Carnian-middle Carnian, ~236 Ma), biostratigraphically equivalent to the Santacruzodon Assemblage Zone.

The final sequence, which is only partially present within the formation, is the Candelária Sequence (middle Carnian-latest Carnian, ~233-228 Ma). The lower portion of this sequence, coinciding with the upper part of the Santa Maria Formation, is equivalent to the Hyperodapedon Assemblage Zone.The Hyperodapedon Assemblage Zone is itself subdivided into Hyperodapedon Acme Zone (most of the zone, where the rhynchosaur Hyperodapedon is widely reported) and Exaeretodon Zone (restricted to about three known and sampled localities, where rhynchosaurs are almost completely absent, but the traversodontid cynodont Exaeretodon is widely reported). These subdivisions are also known as Lower and Upper Hyperodapedon Assemblage Zone, respectively.

U-Pb radiometric dating of Cerro da Alemoa (the type locality of Saturnalia tupiniquim) in the Upper portion of the Santa Maria Formation found an estimated age of 233.23±0.73 million years ago, putting that locality 1.5 million years older than the Ischigualasto Formation and younger than Los Chañares Formation. The Santa Maria and Ischigualasto formations are approximately equal as having the earliest dinosaur localities.

== Vertebrate paleofauna ==
Most of the information below was included on a revision of the Triassic faunal successions of the Paraná Basin, southern Brazil by Schultz et al. (2020).

=== Temnospondyls ===
Temnospondyls of the Santa Maria Formation
Genus	Species	Location	Stratigraphic position	Material	Notes	Images
Compsocerops	C. sp.	Restinga Sêca	Upper Santa Maria Formation, Alemoa Member, Candelária Sequence, Hyperodapedon Assemblage Zone, Hyperodapedon Acme Zone	A partial skull	A chigutisaurid temnospondyl	

=== Fish ===
Fish of the Santa Maria Formation
Genus	Species	Location	Stratigraphic position	Material	Notes	Images
Ferganoceratodus	F. cabreirai	Pivetta	Upper Santa Maria Formation, Alemoa Member, Candelária Sequence, Hyperodapedon Assemblage Zone		A ceratodontiform lungfish	
Ptychoceratodus	P. eliseui	Pivetta	Upper Santa Maria Formation, Alemoa Member, Candelária Sequence, Hyperodapedon Assemblage Zone		A ptychoceratodontid lungfish	
Ptychoceratodus	P. phillipsi	Pivetta, Buriol	Upper Santa Maria Formation, Alemoa Member, Candelária Sequence, Hyperodapedon Assemblage Zone		A ptychoceratodontid lungfish	

=== Synapsids ===
==== Dicynodonts ====
Dicynodonts of the Santa Maria Formation
Genus	Species	Location	Stratigraphic position	Material	Notes	Images
Dinodontosaurus	D. pedroanum	São Pedro do Sul, Candelária, Dona Francisca, Bom Retiro, Vale Verde, Novo Cabrais, Bom Retiro do Sul, Dilermando de Aguiar	Lower Santa Maria Formation, Alemoa Member, Pinheiros-Chiniquá Sequence, Dinodontosaurus Assemblage Zone	Cranial and postcranial remains	A kannemeyeriiform dicynodont	
Stahleckeria	S. potens	Dona Francisca, Candelária	Lower Santa Maria Formation, Alemoa Member, Pinheiros-Chiniquá Sequence, Dinodontosaurus Assemblage Zone	Cranial and postcranial remains	A stahleckeriid dicyndont	

==== Cynognathians ====
Cynognathians of the Santa Maria Formation
Genus	Species	Location	Stratigraphic position	Material	Notes	Images
Exaeretodon	E. major	São Pedro do Sul	Lower Santa Maria Formation, Alemoa Member, Pinheiros-Chiniquá Sequence, Dinodontosaurus Assemblage Zone	Cranial and postcranial remains	A traversodontid cynodont	
Exaeretodon	E. riograndensis	Agudo, Santa Maria	Upper Santa Maria Formation, Alemoa Member, Candelária Sequence, Hyperodapedon Assemblage Zone, Exaeretodon Zone	Cranial and postcranial remains	A traversodontid cynodont	
Gomphodontosuchus	G. brasiliensis	Santa Maria	Upper Santa Maria Formation, Alemoa Member, Candelária Sequence, Hyperodapedon Assemblage Zone, Hyperodapedon Acme Zone	Cranial remains	A traversodontid cynodont	
Luangwa	L. sudamericana	Vera Cruz, Candelária	Lower Santa Maria Formation, Alemoa Member, Pinheiros-Chiniquá Sequence, Dinodontosaurus Assemblage Zone	Cranial remains	A traversodontid cynodont	
Massetognathus	M. ochagavie	Bom Retiro, Vale Verde, Dona Francisca	Lower and Middle Santa Maria Formation, Alemoa Member, Santa Cruz nad Pinheiros-Chiniquá Sequences, Santacruzodon Assemblage Zone and Dinodontosaurus Assemblage Zone	Cranial and postcranial remains	A traversodontid cynodont	
Menadon	M. besairiei	Santa Cruz	Middle Santa Maria Formation, Alemoa Member, Santa Cruz Sequence, Santacruzodon Assemblage Zone	Cranial remains	A traversodontid cynodont	
Protuberum	P. cabralensis	Paraíso do Sul, Novo Cabrais	Lower Santa Maria Formation, Alemoa Member, Pinheiros-Chiniquá Sequence, Dinodontosaurus Assemblage Zone	Partial articulated skeleton including skull, vertebrae and ribs	A traversodontid cynodont	
Santacruzodon	S. hopsoni	Santa Cruz	Middle Santa Maria Formation, Alemoa Member, Santa Cruz Sequence, Santacruzodon Assemblage Zone	Cranial remains	A traversodontid cynodont	
Santagnathus	S. mariensis		Hyperodapedon Assemblage Zone	Numerous cranial and postcranial remains	A traversodontid cynodont	
Scalenodon	S. ribeiroae	Agudo	Lower Santa Maria Formation, Alemoa Member, Pinheiros-Chiniquá Sequence, Dinodontosaurus Assemblage Zone	Cranial remains	A traversodontid cynodont	
Traversodon	T. stahleckeri	São Pedro do Sul	Lower Santa Maria Formation, Alemoa Member, Pinheiros-Chiniquá Sequence, Dinodontosaurus Assemblage Zone	Cranial remains	A traversodontid cynodont	

==== Probainognathians ====
Probainognathians of the Santa Maria Formation
Genus	Species	Location	Stratigraphic position	Material	Notes	Images
Alemoatherium	A. huebneri	Santa Maria	Upper Santa Maria Formation, Alemoa Member, Candelária Sequence, Hyperodapedon Assemblage Zone, Hyperodapedon Acme Zone	A partial dentary	A prozostrodontian cynodont	
Aleodon	A. cromptoni	Vale Verde, Candelária, Bom Retiro do Sul, Novo Cabrais	Lower Santa Maria Formation, Alemoa Member, Pinheiros-Chiniquá Sequence, Dinodontosaurus Assemblage Zone	Cranial and postcranial remains	A chiniquodontid cynodont	
Bonacynodon	B. schultzi	Candelária	Lower Santa Maria Formation, Alemoa Member, Pinheiros-Chiniquá Sequence, Dinodontosaurus Assemblage Zone	Cranial remains	A probainognathid cynodont	
Candelariodon	C. barberenai	Candelária	Lower Santa Maria Formation, Alemoa Member, Pinheiros-Chiniquá Sequence, Dinodontosaurus Assemblage Zone	A partial mandible having some complete teeth	A basal probainognathian cynodont	
Charruodon	C. tetracuspidatus	Candelária	Upper Santa Maria Formation, Alemoa Member, Candelária Sequence, Hyperodapedon Assemblage Zone, Hyperodapedon Acme Zone	A partial dentary	A basal probainognathian cynodont	
Chiniquodon	C. theotonicus	São Pedro do Sul	Lower Santa Maria Formation, Alemoa Member, Pinheiros-Chiniquá Sequence, Dinodontosaurus Assemblage Zone	Several cranial remains	A chiniquodontid cynodont	
Chiniquodon	C. sp.	Santa Cruz	Middle Santa Maria Formation, Alemoa Member, Santa Cruz Sequence, Santacruzodon Assemblage Zone	Cranial and postcranial remains	A chiniquodontid cynodont	
Protheriodon	P. estudianti	Dona Francisca	Lower Santa Maria Formation, Alemoa Member, Pinheiros-Chiniquá Sequence, Dinodontosaurus Assemblage Zone	Cranial remains	A basal probainognathian cynodont	
Prozostrodon	P. brasiliensis	Santa Maria, São João do Polêsine	Upper Santa Maria Formation, Alemoa Member, Candelária Sequence, Hyperodapedon Assemblage Zone, Hyperodapedon Acme Zone	Cranial remains	A prozostrodontian cynodont	
Santacruzgnathus	S. abdalai	Santa Cruz	Middle Santa Maria Formation, Alemoa Member, Santa Cruz Sequence, Santacruzodon Assemblage Zone	Cranial remains	A prozostrodontian cynodont	
Therioherpeton	T. cargnini	Santa Maria	Upper Santa Maria Formation, Alemoa Member, Candelária Sequence, Hyperodapedon Assemblage Zone, Hyperodapedon Acme Zone	Cranial remains	A prozostrodontian cynodont	
Trucidocynodon	T. riograndensis	Agudo	Upper Santa Maria Formation, Alemoa Member, Candelária Sequence, Hyperodapedon Assemblage Zone, Exaeretodon Zone	Cranial and postcranial elements of an almost complete skeleton and an additional large skull	An ecteniniid cynodont	

=== Reptiles ===
==== Pseudosuchians ====
Pseudosuchians of the Santa Maria Formation
Genus	Species	Location	Stratigraphic position	Material	Notes	Images
Aetobarbakinoides	A. brasiliensis	Santa Maria	Upper Santa Maria Formation, Alemoa Member, Candelária Sequence, Hyperodapedon Assemblage Zone, Hyperodapedon Acme Zone	Partial postcranial skeleton	A aetosaur	
Aetosauroides	A. scagliai	Santa Maria, São João do Polêsine, São Pedro do Sul	Upper Santa Maria Formation, Alemoa Member, Candelária Sequence, Hyperodapedon Assemblage Zone, Hyperodapedon Acme Zone	An almost complete skull and incomplete postcranial elements	An aetosaur	
Archeopelta	A. arborensis	São Pedro do Sul	Lower Santa Maria Formation, Alemoa Member, Pinheiros-Chiniquá Sequence, Dinodontosaurus Assemblage Zone	Cranial and postcranial elements	An erpetosuchid	
Dagasuchus	D. santacruzensis	Santa Cruz do Sul	Middle Santa Maria Formation, Alemoa Member, Santa Cruz Sequence, Santacruzodon Assemblage Zone	An ilium and a pair of ischia	A loricatan	
Decuriasuchus	D. quartacolonia	Dona Francisca	Lower Santa Maria Formation, Alemoa Member, Pinheiros-Chiniquá Sequence, Dinodontosaurus Assemblage Zone	Assemblage of several individuals, which together preserved virtually all the skeleton	A loricatan	
Dynamosuchus	D. collisensis	Agudo	Upper Santa Maria Formation, Alemoa Member, Candelária Sequence, Hyperodapedon Assemblage Zone, Exaeretodon Zone	Semi-articulated partial skull and disarticulated fragmentary postcranial skeleton	An ornithosuchid	
Pagosvenator	P. candelariensis	Candelária	Lower Santa Maria Formation, Alemoa Member, Pinheiros-Chiniquá Sequence, Dinodontosaurus Assemblage Zone	Poorly preserved skull and cervical elements	An erpetosuchid	
Parvosuchus	P. aurelioi	Linha Várzea 2, Pinheiros-Chiniquá.	Dinodontosaurus Assemblage Zone.	A largely articulated skeleton, skull, and lower jaws.	A gracilisuchid	
"Polesinesuchus"	"P. aurelioi"	São João do Polêsine	Upper Santa Maria Formation, Alemoa Member, Candelária Sequence, Hyperodapedon Assemblage Zone, Hyperodapedon Acme Zone	Several postcranial elements	An immature aetosaur, possible synonym of Aetosauroides scagliai	
Prestosuchus	P. chiniquensis "Karamuru vorax"	Candelária, Dona Francisca, São Pedro do Sul, and possibly Vale Verde ("K. vorax")	Lower Santa Maria Formation, Alemoa Member, Pinheiros-Chiniquá Sequence, Dinodontosaurus Assemblage Zone	Virtually all the skeleton is known	A loricatan	
Procerosuchus	P. celer	São Pedro do Sul	Lower Santa Maria Formation, Alemoa Member, Pinheiros-Chiniquá Sequence, Dinodontosaurus Assemblage Zone	Postcranial elements	A loricatan	
Rauisuchus	R. tiradentes	Santa Maria	Upper Santa Maria Formation, Alemoa Member, Candelária Sequence, Hyperodapedon Assemblage Zone, Hyperodapedon Acme Zone	Incomplete skeleton including skull elements, several vertebrae and partial hindlimb	A loricatan	
Schultzsuchus	S. loricatus	São Pedro do Sul	Lower Santa Maria Formation, Alemoa Member, Pinheiros-Chiniquá Sequence, Dinodontosaurus Assemblage Zone	A tooth fragment and several postcranial elements.	A pseudosuchian, possibly a basal poposauroid.	
Tainrakuasuchus	T. bellator	Posto site	Lower Santa Maria Formation, Ladinian Member, Pinheiros-Chiniquá Sequence, Dinodontosaurus Assemblage Zone	A partial lower jaw, five vertebrae, and a partial hip	A poposauroid	
Unnamed loricatan	-	Santa Maria	Upper Santa Maria Formation, Alemoa Member, Candelária Sequence, Hyperodapedon Assemblage Zone, Hyperodapedon Acme Zone	Specimen UFSM 11617, an almost complete right maxilla	A loricatan	

==== Avemetatarsalians ====
Avemetatarsalians of the Santa Maria Formation
Genus	Species	Location	Stratigraphic position	Material	Notes	Images
Amanasaurus	A. nesbitti	Restinga Sêca	Upper Santa Maria Formation, Alemoa Member, Candelária Sequence, Hyperodapedon Assemblage Zone, Hyperodapedon Acme Zone	Two partial femora	A silesaurid	
Bagualosaurus	B. agudoensis	Agudo	Upper Santa Maria Formation, Alemoa Member, Candelária Sequence, Hyperodapedon Assemblage Zone, Exaeretodon Zone	Almost complete skull with lower jaws, several vertebrae, partial pelvic girdle, partial hindlimbs	A basal sauropodomorph	
Buriolestes	B. schultzi	São João do Polêsine	Upper Santa Maria Formation, Alemoa Member, Candelária Sequence, Hyperodapedon Assemblage Zone, Hyperodapedon Acme Zone	Parts of the skull, vertebrae, left forelimb, and left hindlimb	The basalmost sauropodomorph	
Gamatavus	G. antiquus	Dilermando de Aguiar	Lower Santa Maria Formation ('Picada do Gama' site), Pinheiros-Chiniquá Sequence, Dinodontosaurus Assemblage Zone	A partial right ilium; a partial left femur and four incomplete vertebrae found in association with the holotype may belong to Gamatavus, but they were not assigned	One of the oldest known silesaurids from South America	
Gnathovorax	G. cabreirai	São João do Polêsine	Upper Santa Maria Formation, Alemoa Member, Candelária Sequence, Hyperodapedon Assemblage Zone, Hyperodapedon Acme Zone	A complete semi-articulated skeleton, part of a multiataxic fossil assemblage, including two cynodonts and two rhynchosaurs	A herrerasaurid	
Gondwanax	G. paraisensis	Paraíso do Sul	Lower Santa Maria Formation ('Linha Várzea 2' site), Pinheiros-Chiniquá Sequence, Dinodontosaurus Assemblage Zone	Associated remains possibly belonging to multiple individuals, including cervical, dorsal, sacral, and caudal vertebrae, a partial pelvic girdle, and a femur	One of the oldest known silesaurids from South America	
Itaguyra	I. occulta	'Schoenstatt Sanctuary fossil site'	Upper Santa Maria Formation, Santa Cruz Sequence, Santacruzodon Assemblage Zone	Two partial pelvic bones consist of a partial left ilium and an associated partial ischium.	A silesaurid.	
Ixalerpeton	I. polesinensis	São João do Polêsine	Upper Santa Maria Formation, Alemoa Member, Candelária Sequence, Hyperodapedon Assemblage Zone, Hyperodapedon Acme Zone	Partial skull including a partial maxilla and both dentaries, most of the presacral vertebrae, two sacral vertebrae, several caudal verterae and associated chevrons, scapula and humerus, femora of at least two individuals, and tibia	A basal lagerpetid	
Nhandumirim	N. waldsangae	Santa Maria	Upper Santa Maria Formation, Alemoa Member, Candelária Sequence, Hyperodapedon Assemblage Zone, Hyperodapedon Acme Zone	Some vertebrae, partial pelvic girdle, partial hindlimb	A juvenile saturnaliid sauropodomorph	
Pampadromaeus	P. barberenai	Agudo	Upper Santa Maria Formation, Alemoa Member, Candelária Sequence, Hyperodapedon Assemblage Zone, Exaeretodon Zone	Almost complete skull and lower jaws, several vertebrae, partial pectoral girdle, partial forelimb, partial pelvic girdle, partial hindlimb	A basal sauropodomorph	
Saturnalia	S. tupiniquim	Santa Maria	Upper Santa Maria Formation, Alemoa Member, Candelária Sequence, Hyperodapedon Assemblage Zone, Hyperodapedon Acme Zone	Three partial skeleton, including partial skull and lower jaw, complete cervical, dorsal and partial caudal vertebral series, pectoral girdle, partial forelimb, pelvic girdle, partial hindlimb	A basal sauropodomorph	Saturnalia tupiniquim
Spondylosoma	S. absconditum	São Pedro do Sul	Lower Santa Maria Formation, Alemoa Member, Pinheiros-Chiniquá Sequence, Dinodontosaurus Assemblage Zone	Several postcranial remains	An aphanosaurian	
Staurikosaurus	S. pricei	Santa Maria	Upper Santa Maria Formation, Alemoa Member, Candelária Sequence, Hyperodapedon Assemblage Zone, Hyperodapedon Acme Zone	Partial postcranial skeleton with mandible	A basal herrerasaurid	
Sauropodomorpha	Sauropodomorpha indet	Cerro da Alemoa site	Cerro da Alemoa outcrop	a humerus, a metatarsal, an ungual phalanx, a neural arch, and a vertebral centrum.	The smallest well-preserved skeletal remains of a sauropodomorph from Brazil.	
Venetoraptor	V. gassenae	São João do Polêsine	Upper Santa Maria Formation, Alemoa Member, Candelária Sequence, Hyperodapedon Assemblage Zone, Hyperodapedon Acme Zone	Partially articulated skeleton consisting of an incomplete skull, cervical, dorsal, and caudal vertebrae, a partial pelvic girdle, and elements of the arms and legs	A lagerpetid.	
Unnamed dinosauromorph	-	Dona Francisca	Lower Santa Maria Formation, Alemoa Member, Pinheiros-Chiniquá Sequence, Dinodontosaurus Assemblage Zone	Specimen CAPPA/UFSM 0282, a complete, but poorly preserved right femur	The oldest dinosauromorph from South America	
Unnamed herrerasaurid	-	Santa Maria	Upper Santa Maria Formation, Alemoa Member, Candelária Sequence, Hyperodapedon Assemblage Zone, Hyperodapedon Acme Zone	Specimen UFSM 11330, comprised by partial cranial and postcranial remains	The largest Triassic dinosaur skeleton found in Rio Grande do Sul state so far	
Unnamed lagerpetid	-	Santa Maria	Upper Santa Maria Formation, Alemoa Member, Candelária Sequence, Hyperodapedon Assemblage Zone, Hyperodapedon Acme Zone	Specimen UFSM 11611 (partial left femur)	A basal lagerpetid distinct from Ixalerpeton	
Unnamed silesaurid	-	Santa Maria	Upper Santa Maria Formation, Alemoa Member, Candelária Sequence, Hyperodapedon Assemblage Zone, Hyperodapedon Acme Zone	Specimen UFSM 11579, comprised by cranial and postcranial remains	A silesaurid	

==== Other reptiles ====
Other reptiles of the Santa Maria Formation
Genus	Species	Location	Stratigraphic position	Material	Notes	Images
Barberenasuchus	B. brasiliensis	Novo Cabrais	Upper Santa Maria Formation, Alemoa Member, Candelária Sequence, Hyperodapedon Assemblage Zone, Hyperodapedon Acme Zone	Poorly preserved skull and axis vertebra	An archosauriform of uncertain affinities	
Brasinorhynchus	B. mariantensis	Bom Retiro do Sul	Lower Santa Maria Formation, Alemoa Member, Pinheiros-Chiniquá Sequence, Dinodontosaurus Assemblage Zone	A complete skull, atlas, axis, third neck vertebra	A stenaulorhynchine rhynchosaur archosauromorph	
Candelaria	C. barbouri	Dona Francisca, Candelária, Novo Cabrais	Lower Santa Maria Formation, Alemoa Member, Pinheiros-Chiniquá Sequence, Dinodontosaurus Assemblage Zone	Cranial and postcranial remains	An owenettid procolophonoid	
Cerritosaurus	C. binsfeldi	Santa Maria	Upper Santa Maria Formation, Alemoa Member, Candelária Sequence, Hyperodapedon Assemblage Zone, Hyperodapedon Acme Zone	Badly preserved skull and postcranial elements	A proterochampsid archosauriform	
Clevosaurus	C. hadroprodon	Candelária	Upper Santa Maria Formation, Alemoa Member, Candelária Sequence, Hyperodapedon Assemblage Zone, Exaeretodon Zone	Cranial remains	A clevosaurid rhynchocephalian	
Hyperodapedon	H. sanjuanensis H. mariensis? H. huenei	Santa Maria, Agudo, Candelária, São João do Polêsine, Venâncio Aires, Restinga Sêca, São Pedro do Sul	Upper Santa Maria Formation, Alemoa Member, Candelária Sequence, Hyperodapedon Assemblage Zone	Complete skulls, and most postcranial elements	A hyperodapedontine rhynchosaur archosauromorph	
Isodapedon	I. varzealis	Agudo	Upper Santa Maria Formation, Candelária Sequence, Hyperodapedon Assemblage Zone, Exaeretodon sub-zone	Partial skull and mandible	A hyperodapedontine rhynchosaur	
Kuruxuchampsa	K. dornellesi		Middle Santa Maria Formation, Alemoa Member, Santa Cruz Sequence, Santacruzodon Assemblage Zone		A proterochampsid archosauriform. Previously referred to Chanaresuchus	
Macrocephalosaurus	M. mariensis		Upper Santa Maria Formation, Alemoa Member, Candelária Sequence, Hyperodapedon Assemblage Zone	Skull and front part of the torso	A hyperodapedontine rhynchosaur archosauromorph. Sometimes referred to Hyperodapedon	
Pinheirochampsa	P. rodriguesi		Lower Santa Maria Formation, Alemoa Member, Pinheiros-Chiniquá Sequence, Dinodontosaurus Assemblage Zone		A proterochampsid archosauriform	
Proterochampsa	P. nodosa	Candelária	Upper Santa Maria Formation, Alemoa Member, Candelária Sequence, Hyperodapedon Assemblage Zone, Hyperodapedon Acme Zone	Skull and partial postcranial elements	A proterochampsid archosauriform	
Retymaijychampsa	R. beckerorum	Linha Várzea 2	Lower Santa Maria Formation, Alemoa Member, Pinheiros-Chiniquá Sequence, Dinodontosaurus Assemblage Zone	Complete right hindlimb	A proterochampsid archosauriform	
Rhadinosuchus	R. gracilis	Santa Maria	Upper Santa Maria Formation, Alemoa Member, Candelária Sequence, Hyperodapedon Assemblage Zone, Hyperodapedon Acme Zone	Badly preserved skull and postcranial elements	A proterochampsid archosauriform	
Sauropia	S. macrorhinus	Cortado site	Upper Santa Maria Formation, Pinheiros-Chiniquá Sequence, Dinodontosaurus Assemblage Zone	A near-complete skull with mandible in occlusion	A possible procolophonid procolophonoid	
Silescelida	S. acristata	Posto site	Middle Santa Maria Formation, Pinheiros-Chiniquá Sequence, Dinodontosaurus Assemblage Zone	A left scapula, right ilium, and left femur, found in association	An eucrocopodan archosauriform	
Stenoscelida	S. aurantiacus	Agudo	Upper Santa Maria Formation, Alemoa Member, Candelária Sequence, Hyperodapedon Assemblage Zone, Exaeretodon Zone	Almost complete and well preserved hind limb	A proterochampsid archosauriform	
Unnamed malerisaurine	-		Upper Santa Maria Formation, Alemoa Member, Candelária Sequence, Hyperodapedon Assemblage Zone, Exaeretodon Zone	Two cervical vertebrae	A malerisaurine azendohsaurid	
Unnamed proterochampsid	-	Unknown	Santa Maria Formation, Alemoa Member	Badly preserved skull	A proterochampsid archosauriform	

== Formations ==
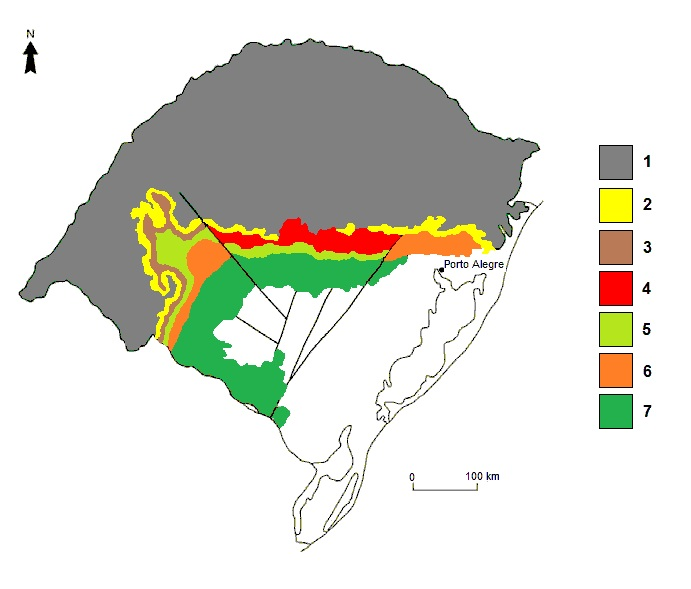
Geological formations in Rio Grande do Sul:
1. Serra Geral Formation, Cretaceous
2. Botucatu Formation, Cretaceous
3. Guará Formation, Jurassic
4. Santa Maria Formation & Caturrita Formation, Triassic
5. Sanga do Cabral Formation, Triassic
6. Piramboia Formation, Permian
7. Itararé Group, Permian

== See also ==
- Caturrita Formation
- Sanga do Cabral Formation
- List of dinosaur-bearing rock formations
