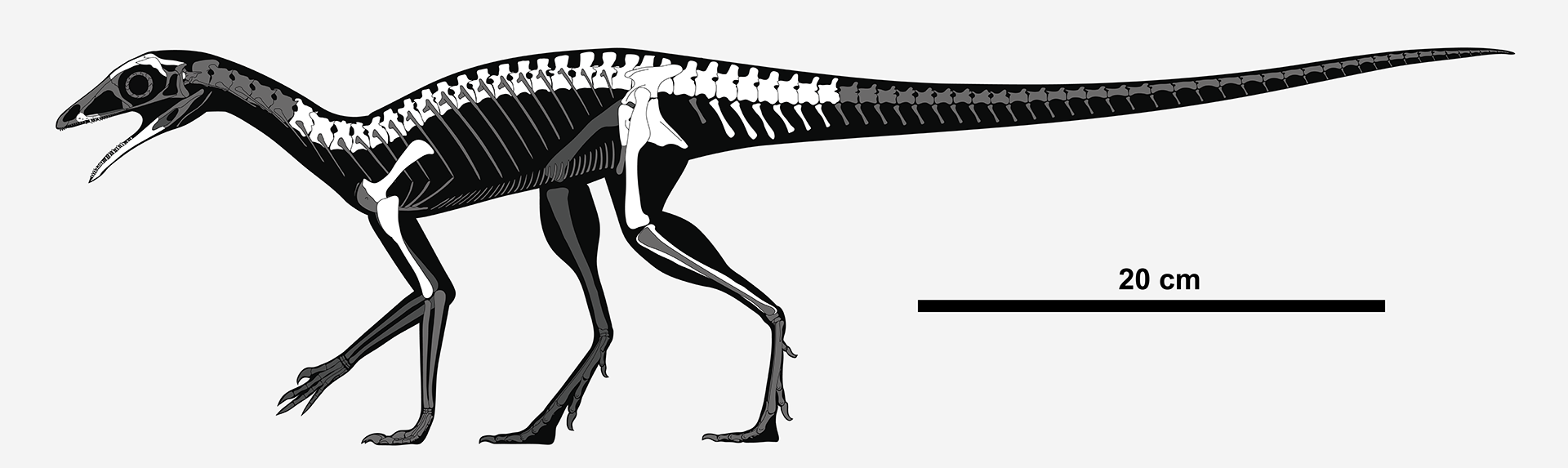
- Skeletal diagram of Ixalerpeton polesinensis, known remains depicted in white, unknown (in dark grey) is reconstructed after other lagerpetids such as Lagerpeton and Dromomeron.

Scientific classification
- Domain: Eukaryota
- Kingdom: Animalia
- Phylum: Chordata
- Family: †Lagerpetidae
- Genus: †Ixalerpeton; Cabreira et al., 2016
- Species: †I. polesinensis

Binomial name
- †Ixalerpeton polesinensis Cabreira et al., 2016

= Ixalerpeton =

Ixalerpeton Temporal range: Carnian ~233.23 Ma

Extinct genus of reptiles

Ixalerpeton (meaning "leaping reptile") is a genus of lagerpetid avemetatarsalian containing one species, I. polesinensis. It lived in the Late Triassic of Brazil alongside the sauropodomorph dinosaur Buriolestes.

== Discovery and naming ==
The holotype specimen of Ixalerpeton, numbered ULBRA-PVT059, consists of parts from the skull, vertebral column, and all four limbs. The specimen comes from the Carnian Santa Maria Formation of Brazil, and it was found alongside two individuals of Buriolestes as well as a set of femora belonging to second individual of Ixalerpeton. The genus name of Ixalerpeton combines the Greek words ixalos ("leaping") and erpeton ("reptile"), and the species name polesinensis references the town of São João do Polêsine, where the dig site is located.

== Description ==
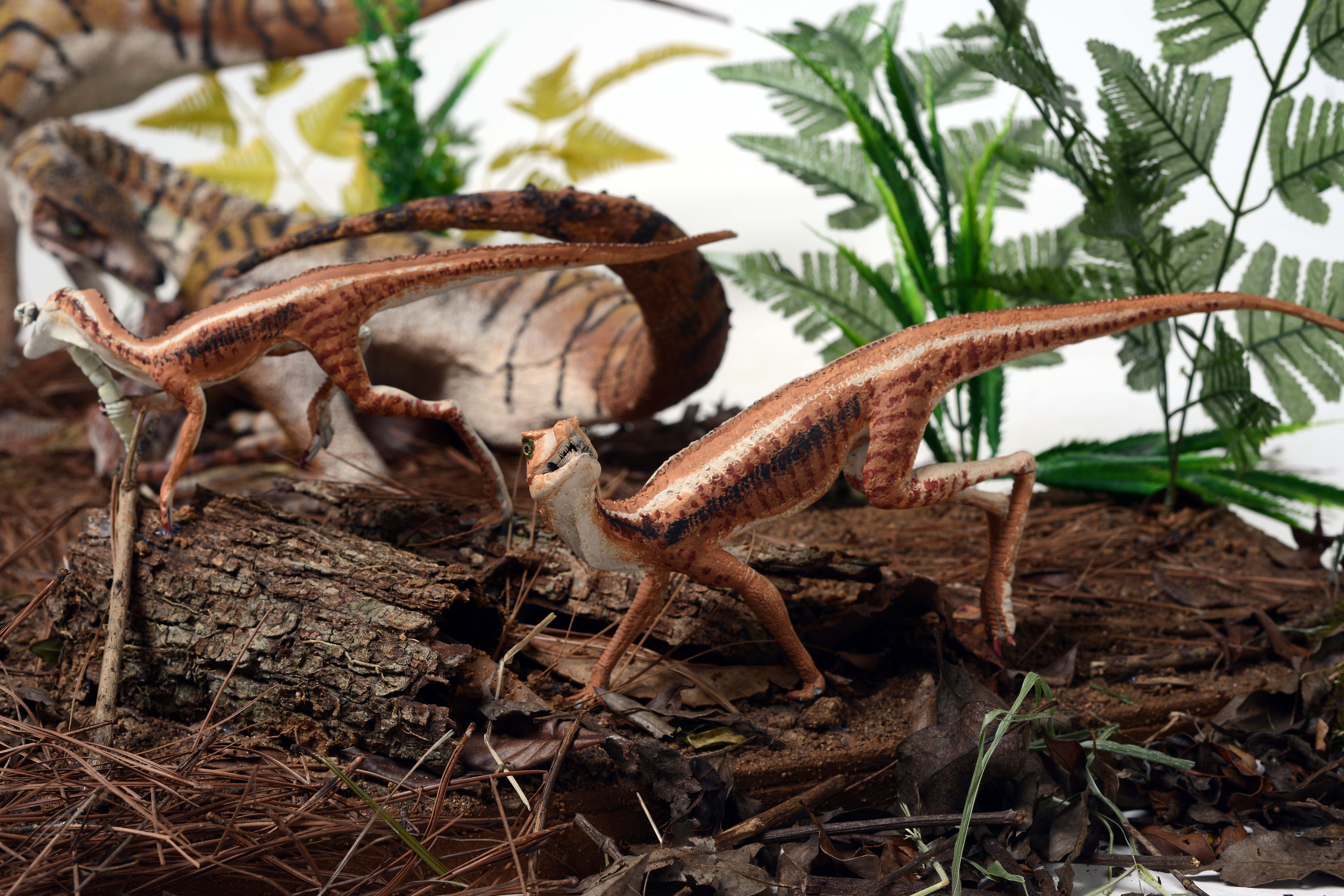
Diorama of a pair of Ixalerpeton (foreground) along with Buriolestes (background)

Ixalerpeton was similar to other lagerpetids (namely Dromomeron and Lagerpeton) in having long hindlimbs with well-developed muscle attachments on the femur; in particular, its fourth trochanter was quite large and formed a crest (which is unlike Dromomeron). However, the last few dorsal vertebrae of Ixalerpeton do not have the forward-inclining neural spines of Lagerpeton (which were associated with the latter's hopping, or saltatory, lifestyle). In addition to the enlarged fourth trochanter, a suite of other traits differentiate Ixalerpeton from all previously-described lagerpetids; there is an antitrochanter on the ilium; the end of the shaft of the ischium is tall; there is no ambiens process on the pubis; the medial condyle on the femur is relatively flat at the front end but sharply angled at the back end; and the back face of the top end of the tibia has a deep groove.

The head and forelimbs found with Ixalerpeton are the first of these elements that have been found among lagerpetids. Unlike dinosauriforms, the posttemporal fenestra at the back of the skull is large and unreduced; there is an extra bone, the postfrontal, bordering the eye socket; there is no supratemporal fossa, which is an indentation found on the frontal bone in dinosauriforms; and the glenoid cavity on the scapula, where the scapula-humerus joint is located, faces slightly sideways instead of backwards. On the other hand, there is an anterior tympanic recess on the braincase, and the deltopectoral crest on the humerus is long, both of which are common among basal dinosauromorphs.

== Classification ==
A 2016 phylogenetic analysis found that Ixalerpeton was the closest relative of Dromomeron. The phylogenetic tree recovered is partially reproduced below.

- Eucrocopoda
  - Euparkeria
  - - Lagerpetidae
      - Lagerpeton
      - - Ixalerpeton
        - Dromomeron
    - Dinosauriformes
      - Marasuchus
      - - Pseudolagosuchus
        - Lewisuchus
        - Saltopus
        - Dinosauria

== Paleoecology ==
Similar to the Ischigualasto and Chinle Formations, the Santa Maria Formation preserves both Ixalerpeton (a non-dinosaur avemetatarsalian) and Buriolestes (a dinosaur). This indicates that dinosaurs did not rapidly replace related groups once they had evolved.
