= Irajá Damiani Pinto =

Brazilian paleontologist and professor

- Born: July 3, 1919; Porto Alegre
- Died: June 21, 2014 (aged 94)
- Scientific career
- Fields: Paleontology, Geology
- Workplaces: Federal University of Rio Grande do Sul

Irajá Damiani Pinto (July 3, 1919 – June 21, 2014), was a Brazilian paleontologist and professor at the Federal University of Rio Grande do Sul (UFRGS in Portuguese), a member of the Brazilian Academy of Sciences, and a two time president of the Brazilian Geological Society.

== Biography ==
Irajá Damiani Pinto was born in Porto Alegre, Rio Grande do Sul, Brazil, on July 3, 1919

He studied Ginásio Nossa Senhora do Rosário. Attended the 2nd grade at Colégio Universitário Estadual Julio de Castilhos. In 1942, he began his studies of Natural History in the Faculty of Philosophy of the then University of Porto Alegre. He graduated BA in 1944. In 1945, even as a student in the undergraduate course, was hired as Assistant Chair of Geology and Paleontology. That year he participated in his first scientific excursion led by Dr. Llewellyn Ivor Price, who contributed much to his scientific orientation. In 1945 he carried out the DNPM, in Rio de Janeiro, with Dr. Paul Ericksen de Oliveira and directed by Dr. Llewellyn Ivor Price, and began the library of Geology and Paleontology at the university. In 1957 he helped create the course in geology of UFRGS, one of the first in Brazil.

The genus of cynodont Irajatherium is in his honor, in addition to the Museum of Paleontology Irajá Damiani Pinto.
