= Aristides Carlos Rodrigues Museum =

Paleontology and natural history museum. in Rio Grande do Sul, Brazil

Museum Aristides Carlos Rodrigues
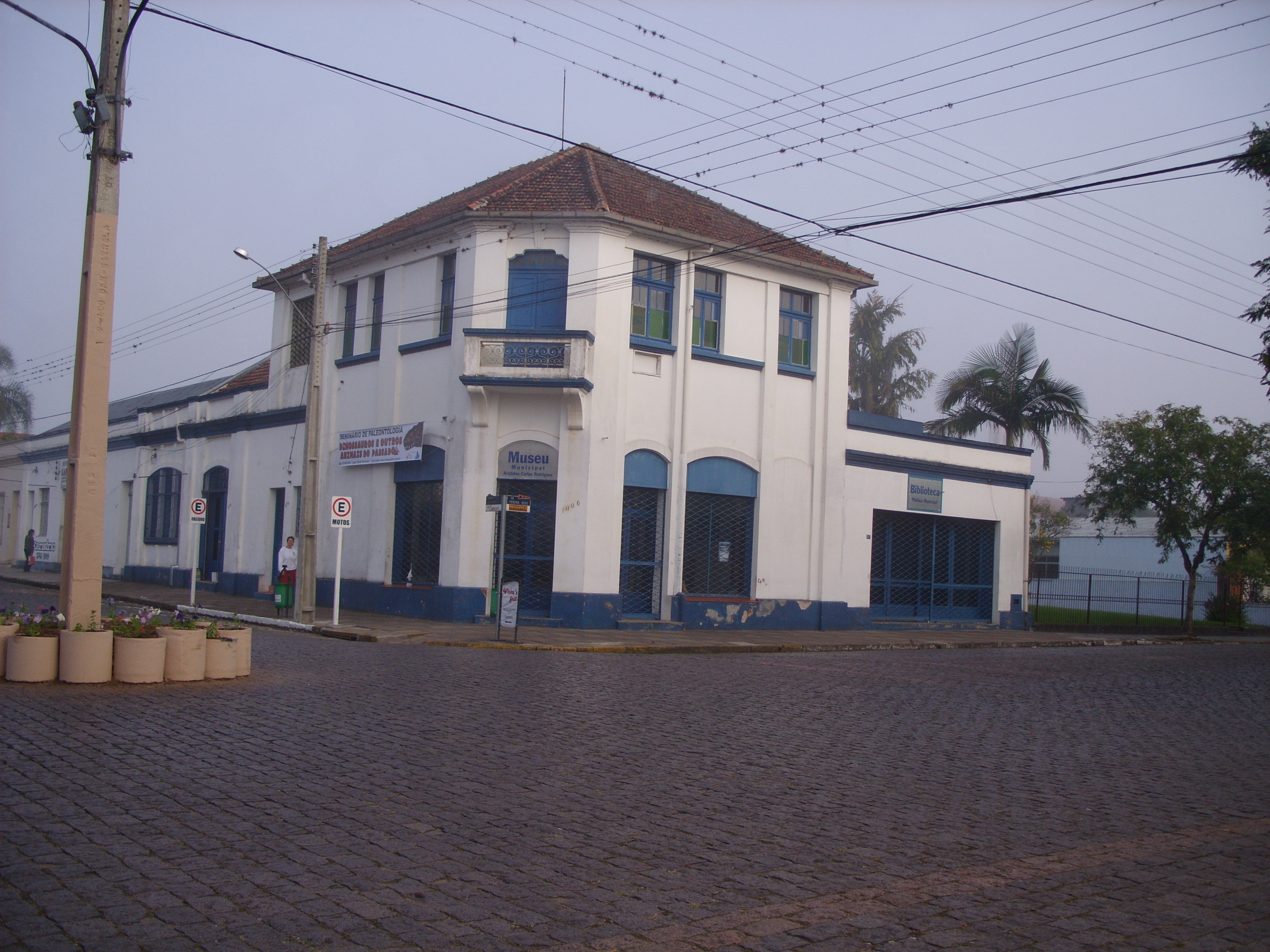
- Established: July 2001
- Location: Avenue Pereira Rego, 1000; Candelária, Rio Grande do Sul, Brazil.
- Coordinates: 29°39′53″S 52°47′23″W
- Type: Paleontology, Natural history museum.

The Aristides Carlos Rodrigues Museum is located at Avenue Pereira Rego, 1000, in the town of Candelária, in the state of Rio Grande do Sul, Brazil. It is a museum of Geopark of Paleorrota with information on the region. It was inaugurated in July 2001.

== Collection ==
Collection of personal effects, machinery, household utensils and work of German settlers, paleontology, archeology.

Sets out various species of fossils from the Triassic Period, such as Dicynodont, Karamuru vorax and rhynchosaur. The collection also includes a replica of Guaibasaurus candelarienses, discovered in Sanga Pinheiro. Many fossils collected in the city, were aimed at the Museum. The UFRGS has made many collections of fossils in this city, and this has helped the museum grow.

== Gallery ==
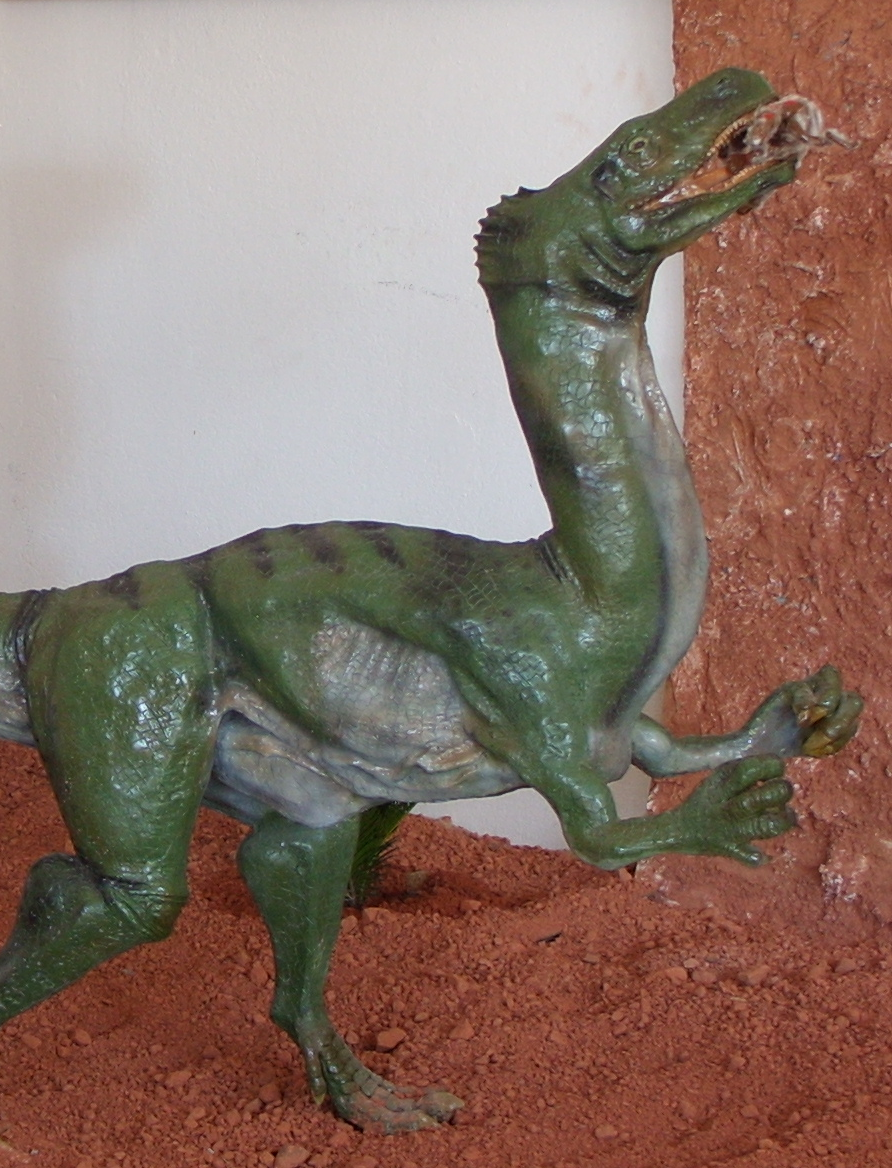
Replica of Guaibasaurus at the Museum

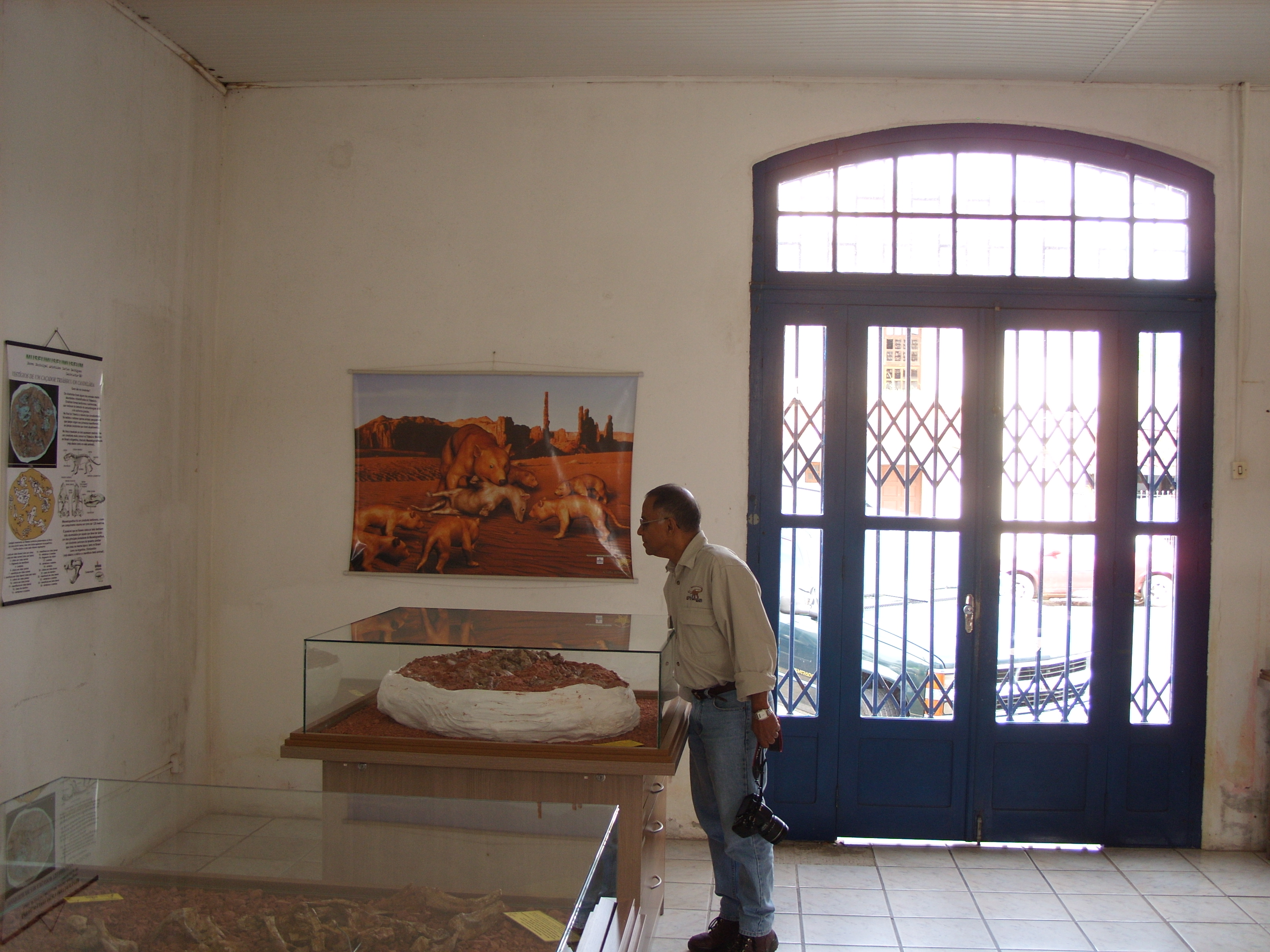
Visiting the Museum (Cynodonts)
