= Paleontological and Archaeological Museum Walter Ilha =

Museum in São Pedro do Sul, Brazil

Paleontological and Archaeological Museum "Walter Ilha"
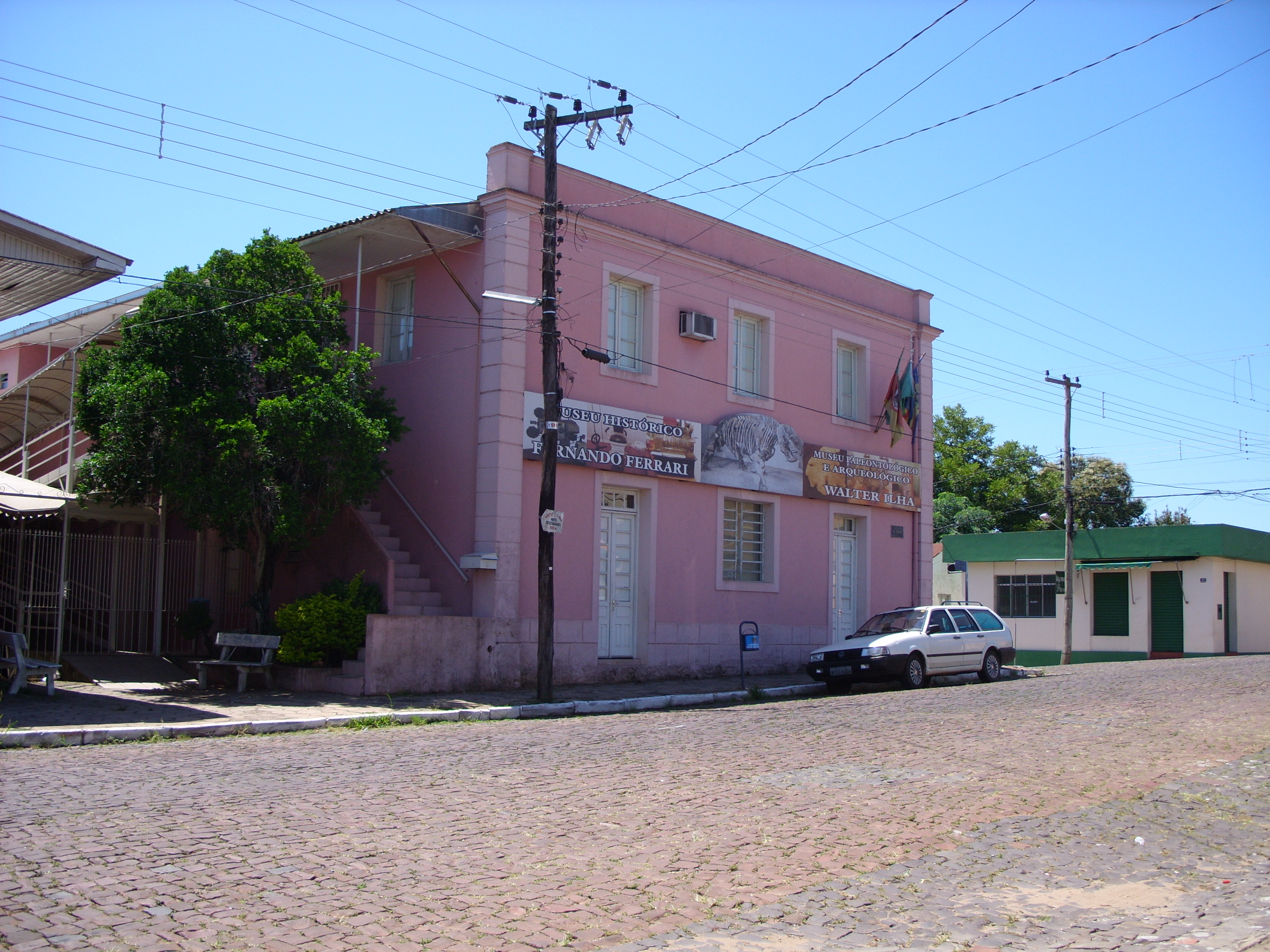
- Established: 1987
- Location: 164, Fernando Ferrari St., São Pedro do Sul, Rio Grande do Sul, Brazil.
- Coordinates: 29°37′15″S 54°10′44″W
- Type: Paleontology, Archaeology.

The Paleontological and Archaeological Museum "Walter Ilha" is a Brazilian museum located in São Pedro do Sul, in the state of Rio Grande do Sul.

== History ==
The Walter Ilha Museum has a considerable collection of fossil samples of plants and animals from around 230 million years ago. It also contains collections on archeology and mineralogy, organized with the intent to show the evolutionary history of life.

The museum was officially created on 27 November 1987 by the Municipal Law No 140-83/88. However, its history is much older. Walter Ilha, a printer by profession and amateur scientist, by consulting the authorities, bibliographies, journals and other means, began looking for information on fossils. Walter started a collection of fossil samples. Working together with the Executive and Legislative powers of the city, he launched the idea of creating a museum.

On 28 September 1980, the Paleontological Museum of the São Pedro do Sul Municipality was inaugurated at a room adjacent to the City Radio building. Even though he was an amateur, Walter Ilha was often invited to speak on scientific events, being accepted as a member of the Brazilian Paleontology Society. Walter Ilha was tireless in his preservation efforts, always contacting people who could help in the preservation of the fossil records, and he would make use of every means available to raise public awareness on these fossils.

Walter Ilha died in September 1987, but his dream began to take shape. In November of that year, the museum was officially created and received his name as a tribute to his work.

== Collection ==
The museum collection started with Walter Ilha's donation of his own collection of mineralogy, paleontology and archaeology samples. Since then, the collection received contributions from UFRGS, UFSM and UNISINOS.
