= Santacruzodon =

Santacruzodon Temporal range: Late Triassic

Scientific classification
- Domain: Eukaryota
- Kingdom: Animalia
- Phylum: Chordata
- Clade: Synapsida
- Clade: Therapsida
- Clade: Cynodontia
- Family: †Traversodontidae
- Subfamily: †Massetognathinae
- Genus: †Santacruzodon

Species
- S. hopsoni (type)

Extinct genus of cynodonts

Santacruzodon is an extinct genus of cynodonts which existed in Brazil during the Triassic period. The type species is Santacruzodon hopsoni.

== Species ==
Santacruzodon hopsoni is a species that was collected in 1995 in Santa Cruz do Sul, in the Geopark of Paleorrota, Brazil. This species is linked to Dadadon, found in Madagascar.
