= Candelária, Rio Grande do Sul =

Municipality of Rio Grande do Sul, Brazil

Candelária
- Municipality
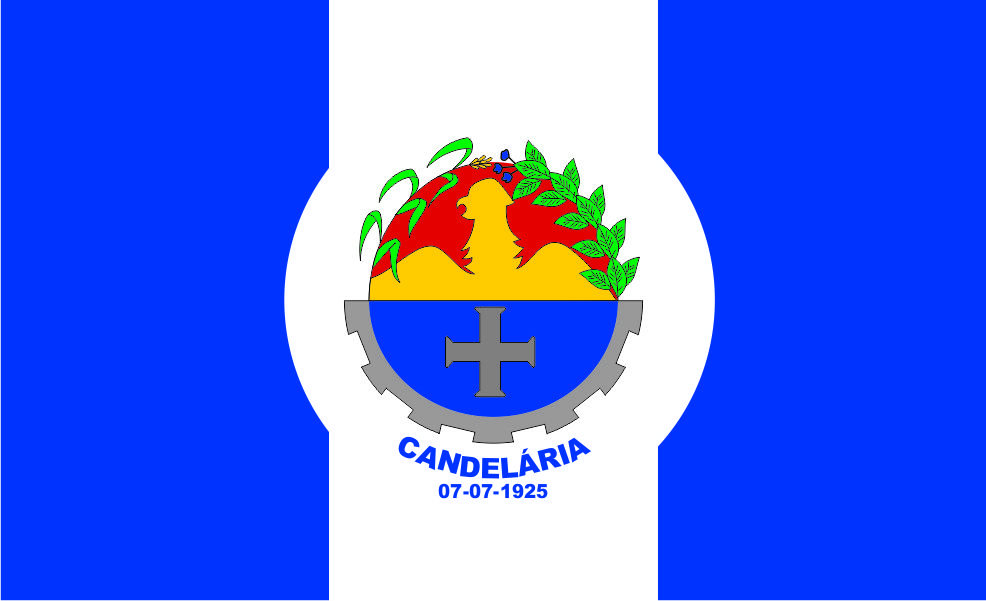
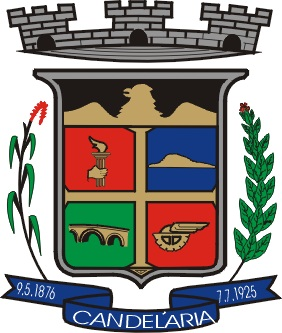
- Flag Coat of arms

- Location in Rio Grande do Sul, Brazil

- Location in Brazil
- Coordinates: 29°40′08″S 52°47′20″W
- Country: Brazil
- Region: South
- State: Rio Grande do Sul

Government
  - Mayor: Paulo Butzge (PMDB)

Area
  - Total: 943.731 km^{2} (364.377 sq mi)
- Elevation: 57 m (187 ft)

Population (2020)
  - Total: 31,421
- Time zone: UTC−3 (BRT)

Candelária is a municipality in the state of Rio Grande do Sul, Brazil.

== Paleontology ==
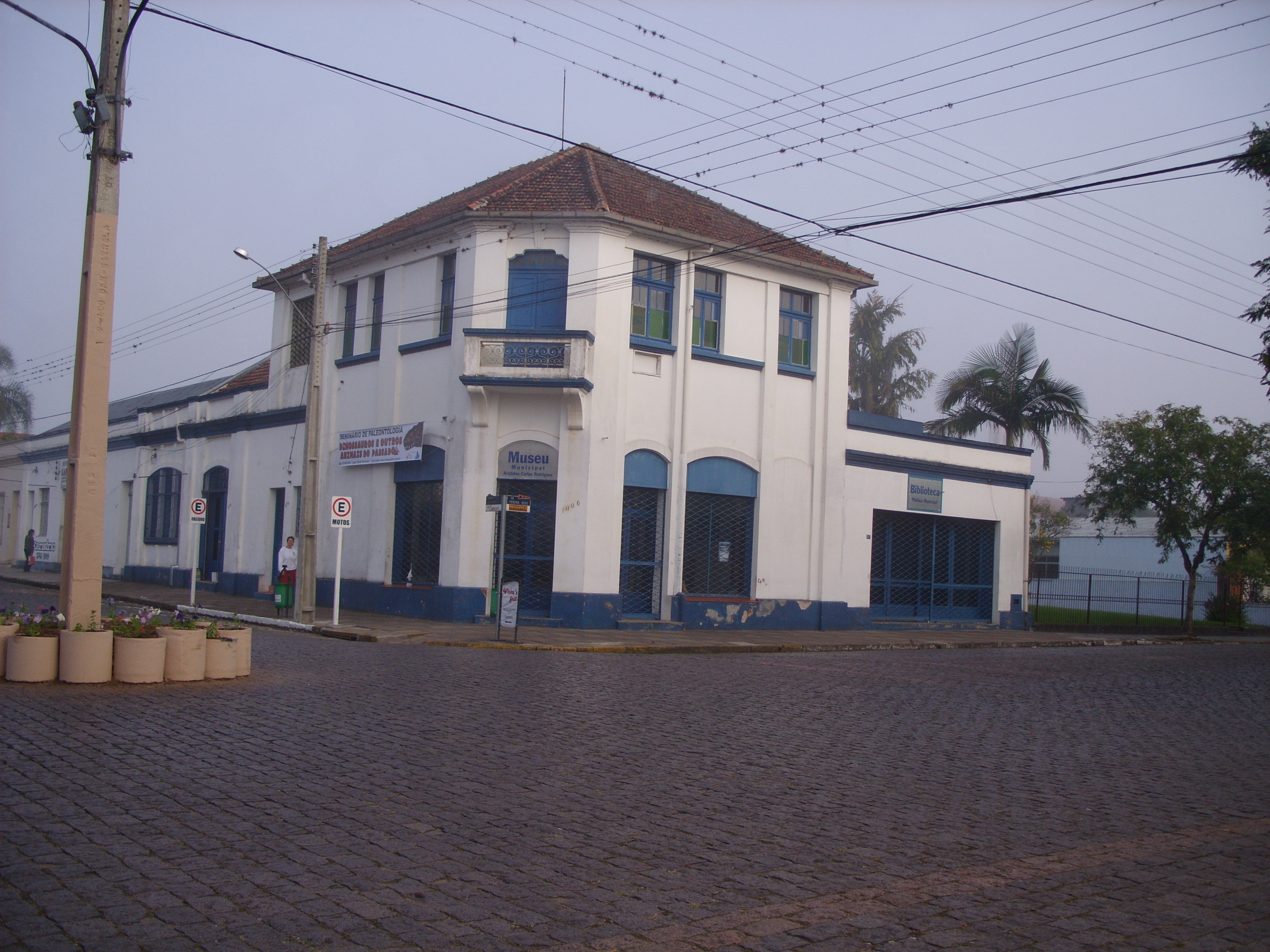
Museum Aristides Carlos Rodrigues

8 km west of Candelária there is an outcrop of Caturrita Formation where various Triassic fossils have been collected, especially small cynodonts like Riograndia. The discovery of Riograndia in 2001 made it possible to better study the complex of anatomical changes involved in the transition from cynodonts to mammals.

The Museum Aristides Carlos Rodrigues, in this city, has fossils.

== See also ==
- List of municipalities in Rio Grande do Sul
