= Friedrich von Huene =

German paleontologist (1875–1969)

Baron Friedrich von Hoyningen-Huene
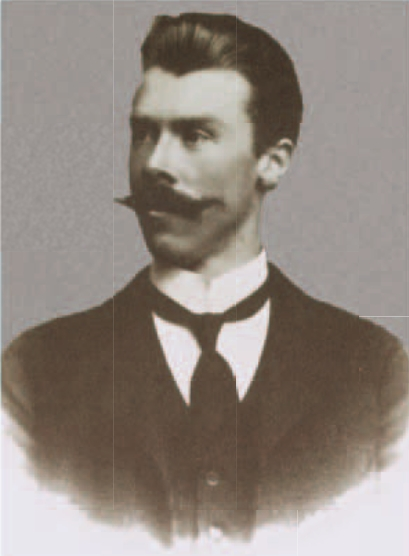
- von Huene c. 1908
- Born: 22 March 1875; Tübingen, German Empire
- Died: 4 April 1969 (aged 94); Tübingen, West Germany
- Known for: fossil studies
- Scientific career
- Fields: paleontologist

Baron Friedrich Richard von Hoyningen-Huene (22 March 1875 – 4 April 1969) was a German nobleman paleontologist who described a large number of dinosaurs, more than anyone else in 20th-century Europe. He studied a range of Permo-Carboniferous tetrapods. He worked at the collections of the institute and museum for geology and paleontology at the University of Tübingen.

== Biography ==
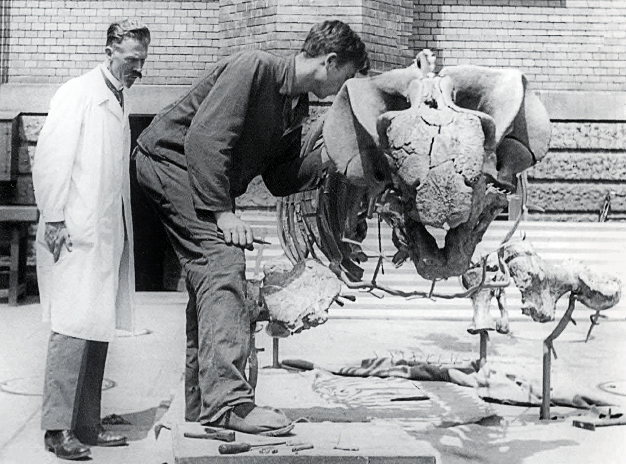
Friedrich von Huene (left) and Rudolf Stahlecker (right) with a Stahleckeria dicynodont skeleton at University of Tübingen, c. 1926.

Von Huene was born in Tübingen, Kingdom of Württemberg and came from a noble Baltic German family. He took this Baltic identity to heart and would later call his home on Zeppelinstraße (now Payerstraße) as Villa Baltica. His father Johannes von Hoyningen called Huene was a Lutheran minister who had studied theology at Göttingen, Tübingen and Dorpat. His mother Alexandra Baronesse Stackelberg came from an Estonian noble family. The junior Huene was also brought up with deeply religious beliefs. He grew up in Switzerland as his father taught at Basel. He also visited Latvia as a child and even as a young boy he collected fossils. He studied at a Swiss Gymnasium and in 1895 his abitur was on Jura fossils. He then went to the University of Lausanne to study theology and natural sciences. He later went to Tübingen to study paleontology and geology under Ernst von Koken. He went to St Petersuburg in 1897 for the 6th International Geological Congress. On a visit to Britain in 1901 he met many British paleontologists and visited the main museums. He thought it was more useful to be involved in geological stratigraphy and therefore decided that he would study brachiopods for his doctoral dissertation which he received in 1898. After this he was persuaded by Koken to study Triassic dinosaurs and his habilitation in 1902 was a review of the Triassic reptiles. In 1904 he married Theodora Lawton and they had five daughters including the paleontologist Erika von Huene.

Von Huene was a poor teacher and was not keen on writing textbooks. He was however always interested in finding ways of finding science fit into creationist frameworks. He considered phylogenetics to be a quest to understand the plan of God. In 1911 he travelled to the United States. When World War I broke out he volunteered at first and in 1915 he became a cavalry officer. Von Huene did not receive academic positions and he even tried to apply to Stanford. In 1925, however, he received an offer from the University of Cordoba in Argentina but he turned it down. The University of Tübingen gave him a conservator position and he took it up, donating his personal collections to the museum there. During the Nazi era Von Huene kept a low profile and continue to publish. He assisted some of his Jewish colleagues like Tilly Edinger (1897-1967) to find work outside Germany with references. In 1945 Von Huene was elected as an honorary professor and in 1946 he became acting director of the institute when Edwin Hennig was removed for his Nazi activities.

Huene described more than 35 individuals of Plateosaurus from the famous Trossingen quarry, the early proto-dinosaur Saltopus in 1910, Proceratosaurus in 1926, the giant Antarctosaurus in 1929, and numerous other dinosaurs and fossilized animals like pterosaurs. He also was the first to name several higher taxa, including Prosauropoda and Sauropodomorpha.

In 1941 Huene discovered a piece of petrified wood filled with the burrows of wood-boring bivalves. He misidentified the petrified wood as the lower jaw of a titanosaur and subsequently named the specimen Succinodon. His error was discovered and corrected in 1981 by two Polish paleontologists.

He visited the Geopark of Paleorrota in 1928, and there collected the Prestosuchus chiniquensis in 1938.

He also studied several Permo-Carboniferous and Triassic limbed vertebrates, including members of several large clades, such as Temnospondyli, Synapsida, and Sauropsida. In his work on mesosaurs, Huene indicated that a lower temporal fenestra was present (as in synapsids), an interpretation later rejected by many subsequent workers, but more recently upheld.

A new species of basal sauropodomorph, Lufengosaurus huenei, was named after von Huene in 1941. Liassaurus huenei, an early carnivorous theropod, was named for him in 1995, though this name is invalid.

== See also ==
- Category:Taxa named by Friedrich von Huene

== Other sources ==
- Isaia, Antônio. Os Fascinantes Caminhos da Paleontologia (Dazzling Paleonotogical Paths) (in Portuguese). Porto Alegre, Brazil: Grafica Editora Pallotti. length: 60 pages; Guide to the fossil finds in Rio Grande do Sul, and especially in the Santa Maria area.
- Beltrão, Romeu (1979). Cronologia Histórica de Santa Maria e do extinto município de São Martinho: 1787-1930 (in Portuguese) (second ed.). Grafica Editora Pallotti. OCLC 10022858. length: 582 pages
