= São Pedro do Sul, Rio Grande do Sul =

Municipality of Rio Grande do Sul, Brazil

São Pedro do Sul
- Municipality
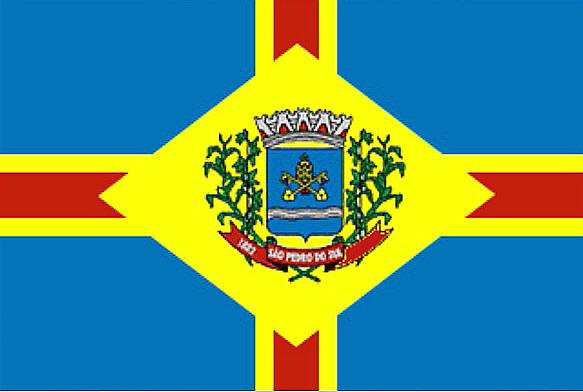
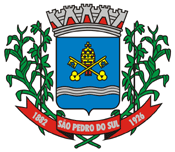
- Flag Coat of arms

- Location within Rio Grande do Sul

- Location in Brazil
- Coordinates: 29°37′S 54°10′W
- Country: Brazil
- State: Rio Grande do Sul

Population (2022)
  - Total: 15,577
- Time zone: UTC−3 (BRT)

São Pedro do Sul is a municipality in the state of Rio Grande do Sul, Brazil.

== History ==
The creation of the 3rd district of peace in the Village of Santa Maria began with a decree from the Provincial Government on June 18, 1861. Its boundaries were nearly identical to the current municipality of São Pedro do Sul, and its first justice of the peace was José Luiz Medeiros.

The city's formation dates back to 1866, when Crescêncio José Pereira donated 14 hectares of land to build a chapel and distributed lands for free to those who wanted to reside here. Until 1926, it belonged to Santa Maria, and on March 22, 1926, it gained its political/administrative independence through State Decree No. 3624.

Throughout its history, it has had several names: "São Pedro do Rincão", "Rincão de São Pedro", "São Pedro", and finally "São Pedro do Sul".

== Geography ==
The municipality is located at a latitude of 29º37'14" south and a longitude of 54º10'44" west, at an altitude of 173 meters. It has an area of 873.592 square kilometers and had a population of 16,148 inhabitants in 2020.

== Paleontology ==
The city of São Pedro do Sul, along with the city of Mata, is part of the Arenito Mata Paleobotanical Sites, created by the Brazilian Commission of Geological and Paleobiological Sites. In São Pedro, the Piscina outcrop was chosen as the site.

== See also ==
- List of municipalities in Rio Grande do Sul
