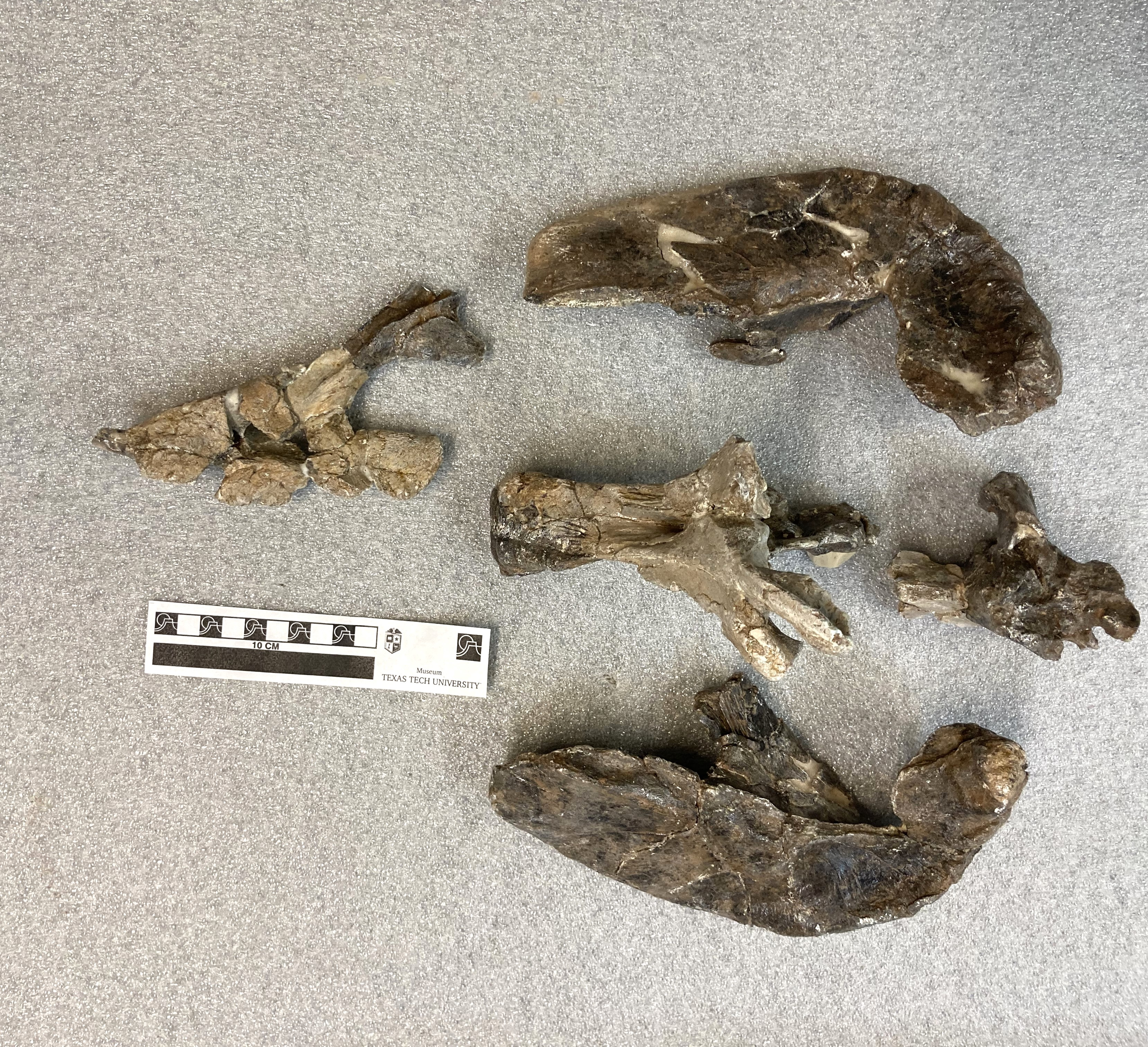
- Portions of the skull of in the collection of the Museum of Texas Tech University.

Scientific classification
- Domain: Eukaryota
- Kingdom: Animalia
- Phylum: Chordata
- Clade: Synapsida
- Clade: Therapsida
- Suborder: †Anomodontia
- Clade: †Dicynodontia
- Family: †Stahleckeriidae
- Subfamily: †Placeriinae
- Genus: †Argodicynodon; Mueller et al., 2023
- Species: †A. boreni

Binomial name
- †Argodicynodon boreni Mueller et al., 2023

= Argodicynodon =

Argodicynodon Temporal range: Late Triassic, Norian

Extinct genus of dicynodonts

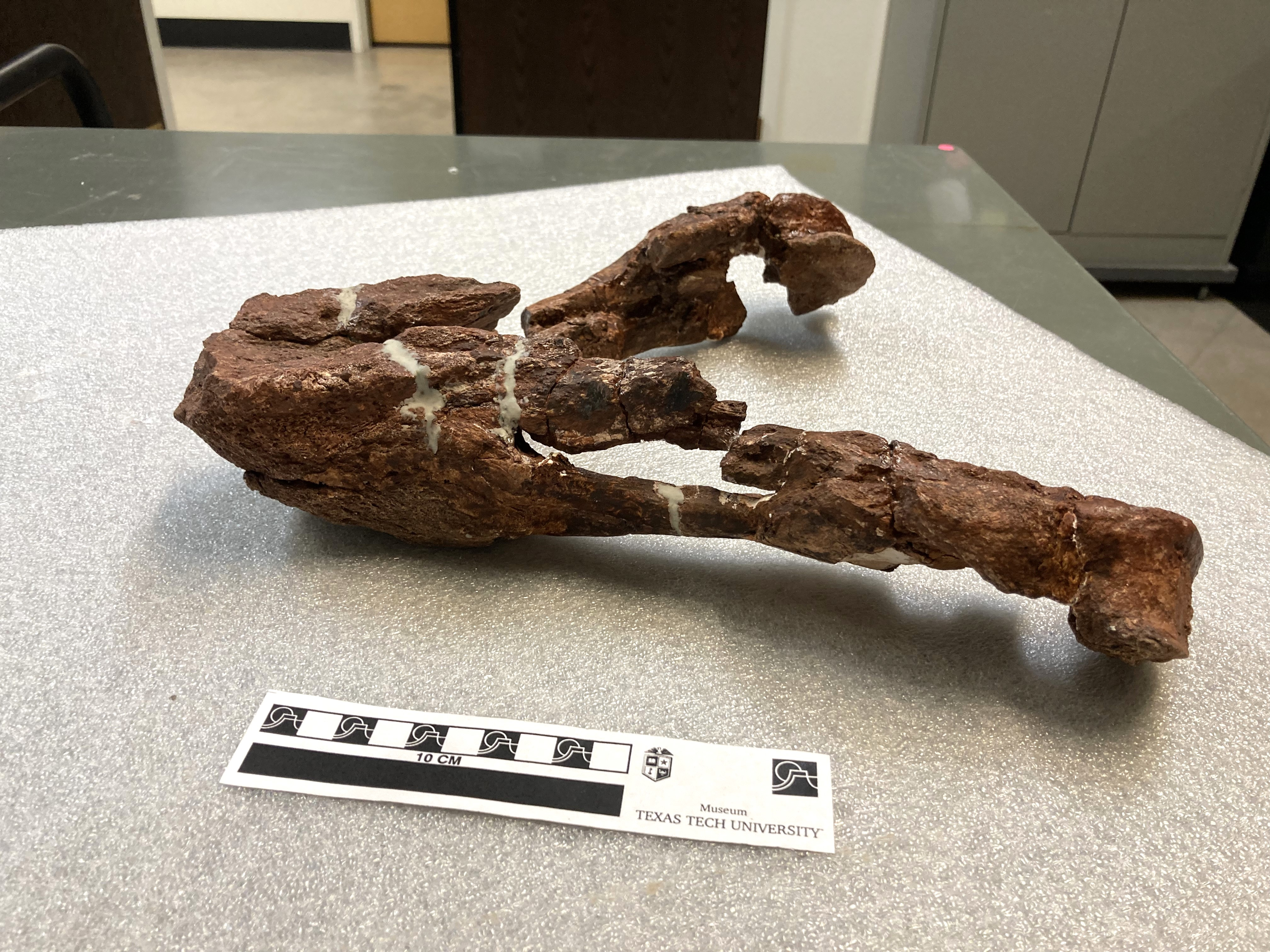
Mandible of Argodicynodon boreni (TTU-P09421) in the collection of the Museum of Texas Tech University.

Argodicynodon is an extinct genus of stahleckeriid dicynodont from the Late Triassic (Norian) of Texas in the United States. The type and only known species A. boreni was named in 2023 by palaeontologists Bill Mueller and colleagues from fossils collected from 1993 to 2014. The combined name is translated as "Boren's swift dicynodont" from the Ancient Greek argos ("swift", "quick") It was discovered in the Boren Quarry in the Tecovas Formation of Texas, strata which has also been referred to as the lower Cooper Canyon Formation, and is known from isolated remains of multiple individuals representing the skull, mandibles, vertebrae, pectoral girdle, forelimb and pelvic girdle. The holotype specimen is a partial skull missing the front of the snout, palate and jaw joints, with a total length estimated to be 33 centimetres (13 in) long. A mandible from a larger individual is estimated to correspond to a skull 49 centimetres (19 in) long. Argodicynodon was related to and resembled the well-known Placerias, but had a tall, narrow sagittal crest rising sharply from behind the eyes instead of a broad flat intertemporal region. Unlike Placerias, Argodicynodon has prominent and exposed, but slender, tusks, more similar to the related Moroccan placeriine Moghreberia. Argodicynodon is also distinguished from Placerias by the arrangement of the joints between the bones of the skull, particularly of the roof of the skull along the sagittal crest. Phylogenetic analyses corroborated the placeriine identity of Argodicynodon.

The cladogram below depicts a reduced strict consensus tree of the relationships of Kannameyeriiformes from Mueller et al. (2023), with taxa that could not be over 50% coded for the analysis (e.g. the other placeriines Lisowicia, Pentasaurus and Zambiasaurus) not included:

- Kannemeyeriiformes
  - Shansiodon
  - Tetragonias
  - Vinceria
  - Rhinodicynodon
  - - Acratophorus
    - Kannemeyeria simocephalus
    - Kannemeyeria lophorhinus
    - Dolichuranus
    - Sinokannemeyeria
    - Parakannemeyeria
    - Xiyukannemeyeria
    - Rhadiodromus
    - Wadiasaurus
    - Shaanbeikannemeyeria
    - Dinodontosaurus
    - Stahleckeriidae
      - Angonisaurus
      - - Ufudocyclops
        - Stahleckeria
        - Placeriinae
          - Placerias
          - Argodicynodon
          - Moghreberia
        - - Sangusaurus
          - - Ischigualastia
            - Jachaleria
