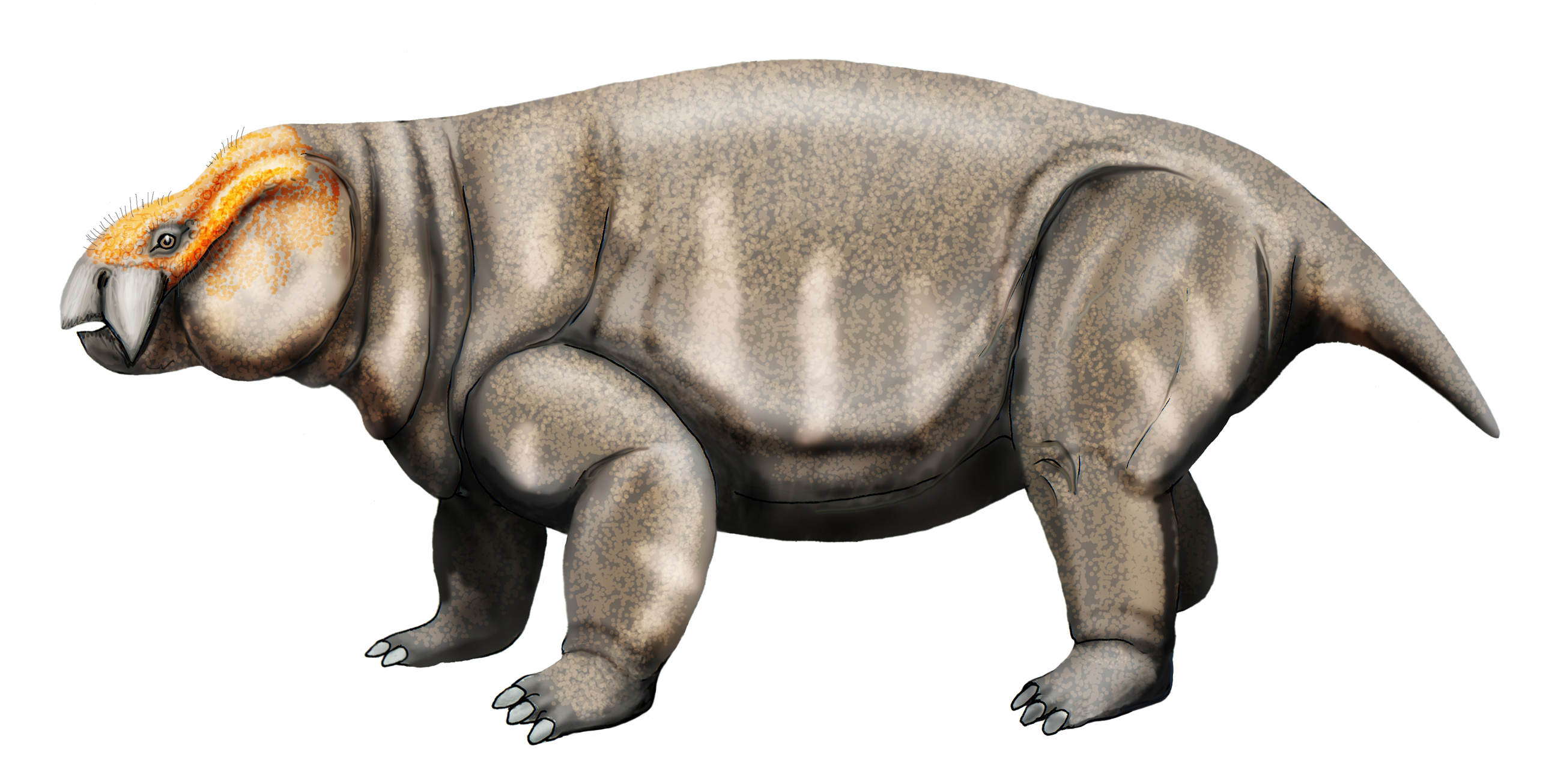
- Life restoration

Scientific classification
- Domain: Eukaryota
- Kingdom: Animalia
- Phylum: Chordata
- Clade: Synapsida
- Clade: Therapsida
- Suborder: †Anomodontia
- Clade: †Dicynodontia
- Clade: †Kannemeyeriiformes
- Genus: †Woznikella; Szczygielski & Sulej, 2023
- Species: †W. triradiata

Binomial name
- †Woznikella triradiata Szczygielski & Sulej, 2023

= Woznikella =

Woznikella Temporal range: Late Triassic, Carnian–?Norian

Extinct genus of dicynodonts

Woznikella is an extinct genus of kannemeyeriiform dicynodont from the Late Triassic (Carnian and potentially Norian) of Poland and possibly Germany of Europe. The type and only known species is W. triradiata.

== Discovery and naming ==
It was discovered in the Grabowa Formation of southern Poland at a locality near the town of Woźniki for which the genus name is named after. The specific name refers to the triradiate pattern of ridges on the palatal-surface of the premaxillary beak; two lateral ridges that converge into a single ridge down the middle, forming a 'Y'-shape. The holotype specimen comprises a partial skeleton of an immature individual, including a fragmentary skull, various vertebrae, a scapula and other portions of the pectoral girdle, a humerus, radius and ulna of the forelimb and a partial femur. A fragmentary mandible from the Stuttgart Formation of Bavaria, Germany may also be referrable to Woznikella.

The Woźniki fossil assemblage was first discovered in 2007, and the remains of Woznikella were first formally reported on in 2010. A full description of the remains was published in 2023 by Polish palaeontologists Tomasz Szczygielski and Tomasz Sulej, wherein it was formally named Woznikella triradiata.

== Phylogeny ==
Phylogenetic analyses found Woznikella to be closely related to the stahleckeriids (a family of Late Triassic dicynodonts) if not a member of the clade, although its precise relationships could not be determined with certainty (although it does not appear to be directly related to another Polish dicynodont, the stahleckeriid Lisowicia).

The cladogram below depicts the strict consensus of three most parsimonious (i.e. shortest) phylogenetic trees of all named kannemeyeriiform taxa except for Ufudocyclops, which was unstable. In this tree, Woznikella is part of the "Stahleckeriidae group" but falls outside of Stahleckeriidae proper (Stahleckeriinae + Placeriinae):

- Kannemeyeriiformes
  - Shansiodontidae
    - Rhinodicynodon
    - - Tetragonias
      - - Shansiodon
        - Vinceria
  - - Dinodontosaurus
    - - "Kannemeyeriidae"
      - - Angonisaurus
        - - Woznikella
          - Stahleckeriidae
            - Placeriinae
              - Pentasaurus
              - - Lisowicia
                - - Placerias
                  - Moghreberia
            - Stahleckeriinae
              - Stahleckeria
              - - Eubrachiosaurus
                - Sangusaurus parringtoni
                - Sangusaurus sp.
                - - Ischigualastia
                  - Jachaleria
