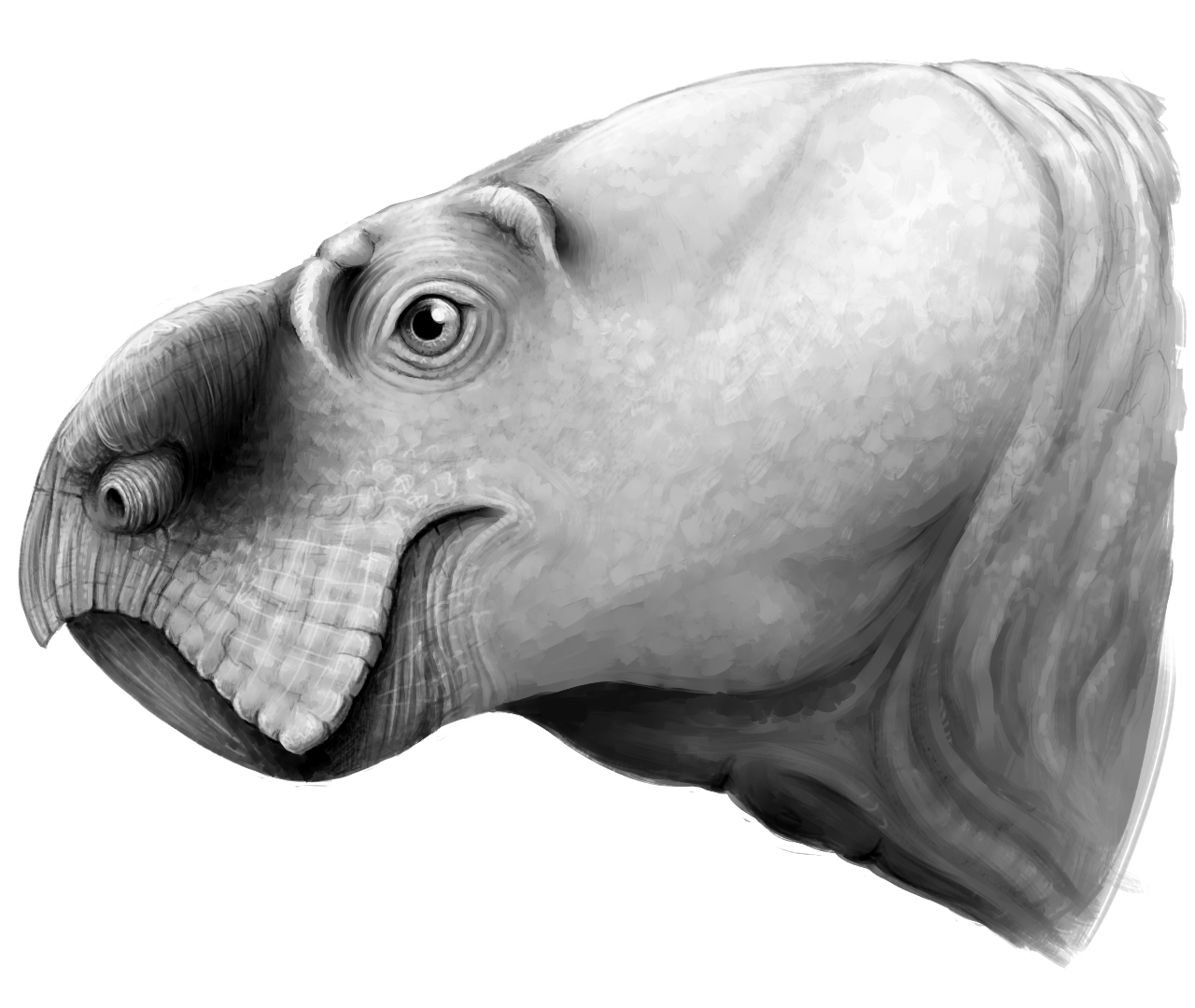
- Life restoration of Ufudocyclops

Scientific classification
- Kingdom: Animalia
- Phylum: Chordata
- Clade: Synapsida
- Clade: Therapsida
- Clade: †Anomodontia
- Clade: †Dicynodontia
- Family: †Stahleckeriidae
- Subfamily: †Stahleckeriinae
- Genus: †Ufudocyclops; Kammerer et al., 2019
- Species: †U. mukanelai

Binomial name
- †Ufudocyclops mukanelai Kammerer et al., 2019

= Ufudocyclops =

Ufudocyclops Temporal range: Middle Triassic ~ Late Anisian

Extinct genus of dicynodonts

Ufudocyclops is an extinct genus of stahleckeriid dicynodont from the Middle Triassic of South Africa. It was found in the Burgersdorp Formation, part of the uppermost Cynognathus Assemblage Zone of the Beaufort Group in the Karoo Basin. The type and only known species is U. mukanelai. It was a large, beaked herbivore like other Triassic dicynodonts, lacking tusks, and is mostly characterised by unique features of the skull. It is known from three specimens, two of which were previously referred to the Tanzanian dicynodont Angonisaurus. The separation of Ufudocyclops from Angonisaurus indicates that the Middle Triassic fauna of the Beaufort Group in South Africa was not part of a larger shared fauna with those of the Manda Beds in Tanzania, as was previously supposed, and suggests that they were separated as more localised faunas, possibly by geographic barriers or in time. Ufudocyclops then would have been a unique part of the uppermost Cynognathus Assemblage Zone in South Africa. It is also the oldest known member of the family Stahleckeriidae, and implies that the family was already diversifying in the Middle Triassic alongside other kannemeyeriiforms, not just in the Late Triassic after other families died out.

== Description ==
Scale diagram of Ufudocyclops to a human

Ufudocyclops is a large dicynodont, with the largest specimen reconstructed to have an estimated skull length of 35 centimetres (14 in) and the smaller complete holotype skull at approximately 29 centimetres (11 in) long, and an estimated overall body size similar to that of Kannemeyeria. Only skulls and one partial lower jaw are definitively known, and no postcrania from the body has been identified, but it likely resembled other stahleckeriid dicynodonts with a heavily built body, short tail, and stocky limbs, possibly including upright hind-limbs paired with sprawling forelimbs like other large dicynodonts. Like some other stahleckeriids, Ufudocyclops appears to have lacked the tusks characteristic of many other dicynodonts, and was completely toothless.

=== Skull ===
The skull of Ufudocyclops superficially resembles Angonisaurus, being relatively tall and notably broad behind the snout, with large, sideways facing eyes and prominent tuskless caniniform processes on the maxilla that project away down and forwards from the snout, flaring out slightly to sides, with blunted tips. The lower surfaces of the maxilla are heavily pitted and rugose, as is the premaxilla and the palate on the roof of the mouth. These textures correspond to the eponymous tortoise-like keratinous beak typical of dicynodonts like Ufudocyclops. The isolated tip of the premaxilla demonstrates that these pits are superficial and do not continue deeper into the bone, as the inner texture of the bone is smooth and tabulate, and so are not foramina.

Like various other dicynodonts, the face is ornamented with bony bosses on the snout around the eyes. The bulbous nasal bones on the top of the snout each sport a single ovoid-shaped boss that overhangs the nostrils and stops just short of the orbits (eye sockets) in front of the eyes. The paired bosses are separated by a 3–7 cm (1–3 in) wide gap of flat, featureless bone between them on top of the snout where the premaxilla and the nasals meet. This is an unusual condition for kannemeyeriiforms, which typically only have a single large boss across the whole surface of the snout. In fact, the bosses are superficially more like those of cryptodonts—a group of Permian dicynodonts unrelated to kannemeyeriiforms—that also had a pair of divided nasal bosses. Similar, but smaller, bosses are found on the prefrontal and postorbital bones, situated around the upper front and back corners of the eyes, respectively. Like the nasal bosses, these two bosses are clearly separated as individual growths, and do not form a continuous rim around the top of the eyes.

The skull of Ufudocyclops is otherwise fairly standard for dicynodonts, however it has some other unique characteristics, such as the form of the jugal bone. In most other dicynodonts the jugal is small and restricted under the eyes, but in Ufudocyclops it extends along much of the lateral (outside) face of the zygomatic arch beneath the eyes and cuts off the maxilla, which usually joins to the squamosal on the zygomatic arch. This unusual setup of the jugal also causes the zygomatic arch to noticeably jut out from the skull under the eyes, compared to other kannemeyeriiforms where it gradually curves out away from the skull. In addition, while most kannemeyeriiforms have the front of the orbits formed only by the jugal and the lacrimal bone, Ufudocyclops also has a very small portion of the maxilla between them too.

Ufudocyclops is also characterised by the unique X-shaped intertemporal bar on the roof of the skull between each temporal fenestra, where the large jaw muscles attached. The bar is broad at the front just behind the eyes and at the back of the skull, while the middle is pinched inwards between the two temporal fenestra, creating the characteristic 'X'-shape. The eponymous pineal foramen on the roof of the skull is also proportionately "enormous" (6 cm (2.4 in) long), implying Ufudocyclops had a very well-developed parietal "third eye". The pineal foramen also has a characteristic depression behind it on the intertemporal bar that is deep and triangular in shape.

=== Mandible ===
The lower jaw of Ufudocyclops is only partially known, and is only known from one of the referred specimens. Most of what is preserved consists of the front half of the mandibles, namely the two dentaries, as well as a splenial and portions of the angulars. The jaws are also missing the tip of the mandibular symphysis at the very front where the two jaw bones are fused, but enough is preserved to suggest the lower beak was somewhat squared off. The dentaries are toothless and covered in pits and grooves like those of the upper jaws, typical of the beaked lower jaws of derived dicynodonts. Additionally, parts of both the articular bones were found attached to the quadrates of the skull. These show the typical dicynodont arrangement with two rounded condyles divided by a ridge between them that allows for the lower jaw to slide backwards and forwards during feeding.

== History of discovery ==
The first specimens of Ufudocyclops (BP/1/5530 and BP/1/5531) were discovered by palaeontologist P. John Hancox while fossil collecting in the southern Karoo Basin near Sterkstroom in the Eastern Cape Province, South Africa in an expedition to assess the stratigraphic range of the dicynodont Kannemeyeria. Together with his colleague Bruce S. Rubidge, the skulls were reported in a research letter to South African Journal of Science in February 1994, where the fossils were recognised as a third distinct genus of dicynodont from the Cynognathus Assemblage Zone (AZ), following Kannemeyeria and Kombuisia. At the time Hancox and Rubidge did not attempt to identify the specimens and simply referred to them as a "tuskless dicynodont". They speculated that large dicynodont postcranial remains from the upper Cynognathus AZ, previously attributed to Kannemeyeria, may have also belonged to their new dicynodont, and that their new dicynodont could be used to further subdivide the Cynognathus AZ above the range of Kannemeyeria.

Hancox and Rubidge later briefly described the specimens in August 1996, and then again in more detail in May 2013, referring them both times to the Tanzanian dicynodont Angonisaurus after favourably comparing their skulls. However, the South African specimens were not identical to the Tanzanian A. cruickshanki, interpreted as either a difference between species, sexual dimorphism, or intraspecific variation between different populations, so Hancox and Rubidge provisionally diagnosed them as Angonisaurus sp. Nonetheless, they were regarded as the first record of Angonisaurus outside of the Manda Beds in Tanzania. This was suggested to support a shared Middle Triassic fauna between the uppermost Cynognathus AZ (now known as the Ufudocyclops–Cricodon Subzone) and the Manda Beds, based on the shared presence of Angonisaurus.

The third and best preserved specimen of Ufudocyclops—BP/1/8208, which would become the type specimen—was not discovered until 2014 and then collected in 2017 as part of a series of joint excavations by the Evolutionary Studies Institute of the University of the Witwatersrand (Johannesburg) and the University of Birmingham (United Kingdom). The skull was found upside down and isolated in a metre thick block of greenish grey fine grained sandstone, alongside the skull of the large cynodont Impidens. The earlier specimens BP/1/5530 and BP/1/5531 were shown to be identical in form to the type specimen of Ufudocyclops, prompting a reinterpretation of the two fossils as specimens of Ufudocyclops, and not Angonisaurus as originally believed.

The genus Ufudocyclops was named from the Xhosa word ufudo, meaning "tortoise", in reference to its toothless, tortoise-like beak, and the Ancient Greek cyclops, referring to the very large size of the pineal foramen ("third eye"). The species is named in honour of Mr. Pepson "Pepsi" Mukanela as recognition for his skills in fossil preparation at the Evolutionary Studies Institute, including his work on the holotype, who had recently retired before its publication. The holotype skull is nearly complete, missing only its left temporal arch and the tips of the caniniform processes. The tip of the snout was also accidentally sawed through during excavation, separating the very front face of the premaxilla from the rest of the skull, but nothing was lost during collection. The condition of the skull is good, preserving much of the surface features including sutures on the skull roof and palate, as well as much of the ornamentation with only some wear on the top of the snout and to the back of the skull. The two referred skulls are much more incomplete and disarticulated, with BP/1/5530 consisting of only a partial skull roof and a single caniniform process, while BP/1/5531 also includes pieces of the palate, braincase and lower jaw.

== Classification ==
Initial examinations of the referred specimens BP/1/5530 and BP/1/5531 identified them as belonging to the genus Angonisaurus. This was argued on the basis of a combination of shared features between these specimens and Angonisaurus thought to be unique to them (although they are now known to be more widespread in Kannemeyeriiformes) rather than shared unique traits. The poor preservation of these specimens made identification difficult, and it wasn't until the discovery of the nearly complete holotype skull that the distinctiveness of Ufudocyclops could be properly appreciated. Interestingly, while not yet recognised as their own genus, the referred specimens of Ufudocyclops were correctly determined to belong to the family Stahleckeriidae, contrasting with associations of Angonisaurus with Shansiodontidae at the time.

Ufudocyclops is distinguished from other kannemeyeriiform dicynodonts, as well as Angonisaurus, by its X-shaped intertemporal bar and deep triangular depression behind the pineal foramen, as well as by the extension of the jugal beneath the eyes and the two distinctly separated nasal bosses.

The relationship of Ufudocyclops with other dicynodonts was tested phylogenetically by Kammerer and colleagues by combining the data from three other recently updated analyses (Angielcyzk & Kammerer 2017, Angielcyzk et al. 2018, and Kammerer 2018) and the new information from the holotype of Ufudocyclops. A simplified cladogram, an excerpt from the full analysis, focused on the relationships of Ufudocyclops within Kannemeyeriiformes is shown below:

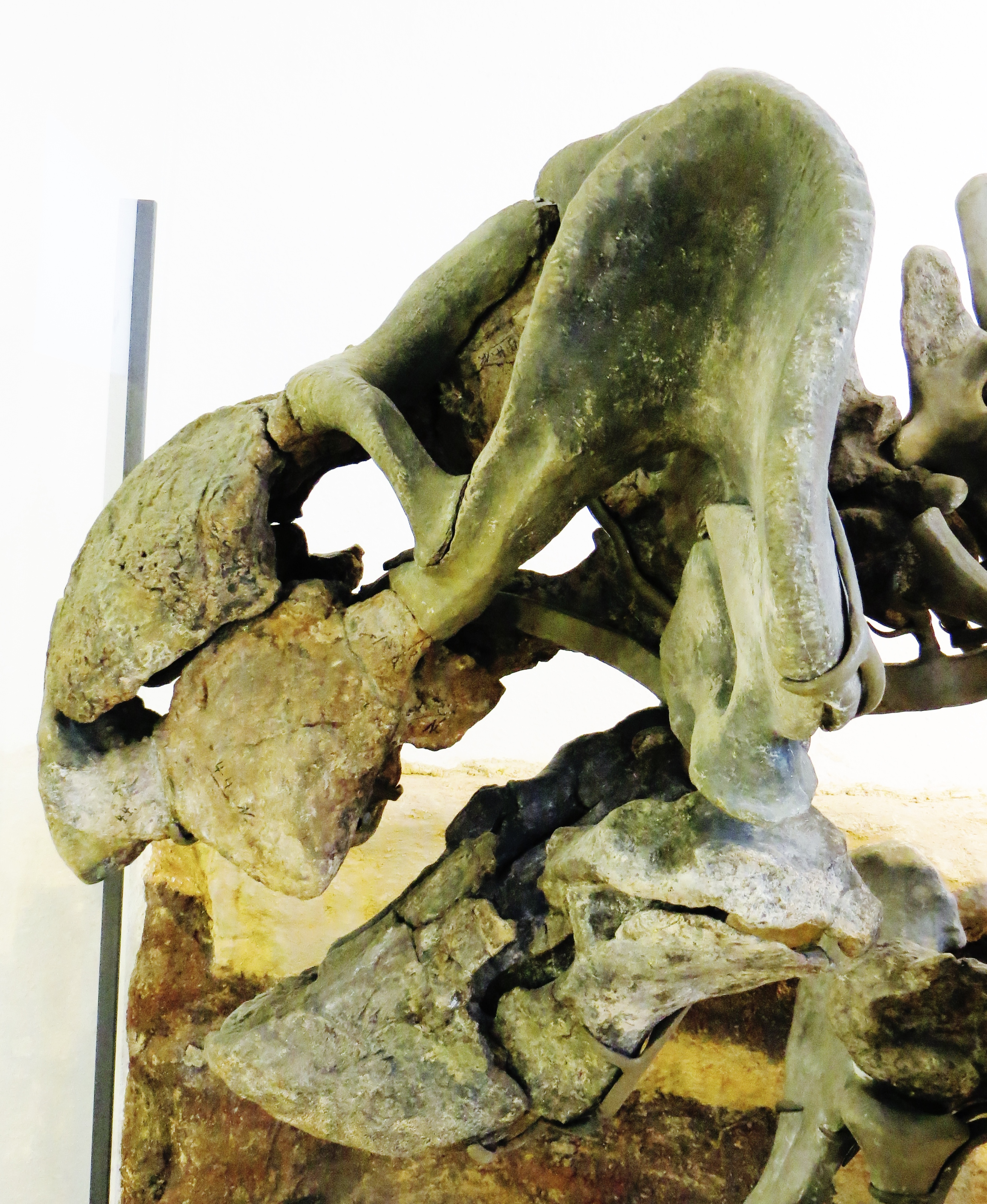
Skull of Stahleckeria, possibly the closest relative of Ufudocyclops.

- Kannemeyeriiformes
  - - Jimusaria
    - Gordonia
  - - Rhinodicynodon
    - - Tetragonias
      - - Vinceria
        - - Shansiodon
          - - "Kannemeyeriidae"
            - - Dinodontosaurus
              - - Angonisaurus
                - Stahleckeriidae
                  - Placeriinae
                  - Stahleckeriinae
                    - - Stahleckeria
                      - Ufudocyclops
                    - - Sangusaurus
                      - - Eubrachiosaurus
                        - - Ischigualastia
                          - Jachaleria

Their results were generally similar to previous studies, although notably within Kannemeyeriiformes the family Shansiodontidae was found to be paraphyletic.

Ufudocyclops and Stahleckeria were found to be each other's closest relatives, sharing at least two characteristics between each other. However, Kammerer and colleagues also identified one feature more like those of earlier kannemeyeriiforms, and found that it was almost as equally plausible that Ufudocyclops could be the most basal species of Stahleckeriinae. This would also be consistent with Ufudocyclops being older than all other stahleckeriines, however, the ancestral appearance of stahleckeriids is poorly understood and so it is unclear whether Ufudocyclops is indeed less derived than Stahleckeria and other stahleckeriines.

== Palaeoeocology ==
Ufudocyclops is known only from the uppermost Burgersdorp Formation, and was a part of the youngest subzone of the Cynognathus Assemblage Zone (AZ) fauna. The Cynognathus AZ was previously divided into three informal subzones, simply known as subzones A, B, and C, and were recognised by a characteristic set of fauna in each, as well as shared components throughout them. These subzones were formally defined in 2020 by Hancox and colleagues, who named Subzone C the Ufudocyclops–Cricodon Subzone in recognition of the unique co-occurrence of Ufudocyclops, endemic to the subzone, and the cynodont Cricodon metabolus. The Cynognathus AZ as a whole has been roughly dated to the Middle Triassic in age, possibly late Anisian. The Burgersdorp Formation is largely made up of maroon clay-mudstones, believed to have been deposited in an environment with a meandering river flowing through it. The unit of rock that preserved the holotype skull of Ufudocyclops grades from cross-bedding and laminated ripples to fine siltstone, and some units also preserve traces of roots. These indicate that the area was part a vegetated floodplain close to flowing water, possibly in a river channel itself or formed as a crevasse splay when the river burst its banks.

The fauna of the Ufudocyclops–Cricodon Subzone is characterised by Ufudocyclops itself, as well as by the presence of the large mastodonsaurid temnospondyl amphibian Paracyclotosaurus morganorum. Ufudocycylops also coexisted with another large dicynodont that is referred only to Shansiodon sp., as well as various cynodonts including the predatory Cynognathus and the herbivorous Diademodon—both of which are ubiquitous to the entire Cynognathus AZ. It also coexisted with two trirachodontid cynodonts, the large and potentially predatory omnivore Impidens, and a smaller species tentatively referred to Cricodon metabolus. The Ufudocyclops–Cricodon Subzone directly overlays the older Trirarchodon–Kannemeyeria Subzone that was characterised by the presence of the eponymous dicynodont Kannemeyeria, which Ufudocyclops had seemingly replaced ecologically as a large browsing herbivore.

=== Palaeobiogeography ===
Because specimens of Ufudocyclops were once thought to belong to Angonisaurus, it was believed that the Ufudocyclops–Cricodon Subzone and the Manda Beds in Tanzania were part of a larger shared fauna distributed throughout Africa during the Middle Triassic, even extending into Antarctica. However, the distinction of Ufudocyclops from Angonisaurus suggests that dicynodonts in Middle Triassic Africa were more divided than had been assumed, separated into different localised faunas and habitats. It is unclear whether Ufudocyclops was geographically restricted to the Karoo Basin from the Manda Beds, or if the two localities were separated in time, but in either case Ufudocyclops was an endemic part of the Karoo dicynodont fauna.

The discovery of Ufudocyclops in the uppermost Karoo Basin also adds to a growing number of stahleckeriids from the Middle Triassic, along with the African genera Zambiasaurus and Sangusaurus. Stahleckeriid dicynodonts were mostly known from the Late Triassic, and had been suggested to have been a 'slow fuse' lineage that radiated only after the older families of kannemeyeriiforms, such as Kannemeyeriidae and Shansiodontidae, had already gone extinct. As the oldest and possibly most basal member of the family, Ufudocyclops demonstrates that the group had already diversified alongside other kannemeyeriiforms. Nonetheless, Ufudocyclops suggests that stahleckeriids were able to replace other kannemeyeriiforms following local ecological turnovers, at least locally in the Karoo Basin, where it replaced Kannemeyeria after the latter had dominated the preceding Trirarchodon–Kannemeyeria Subzone of the Cynognathus AZ.
