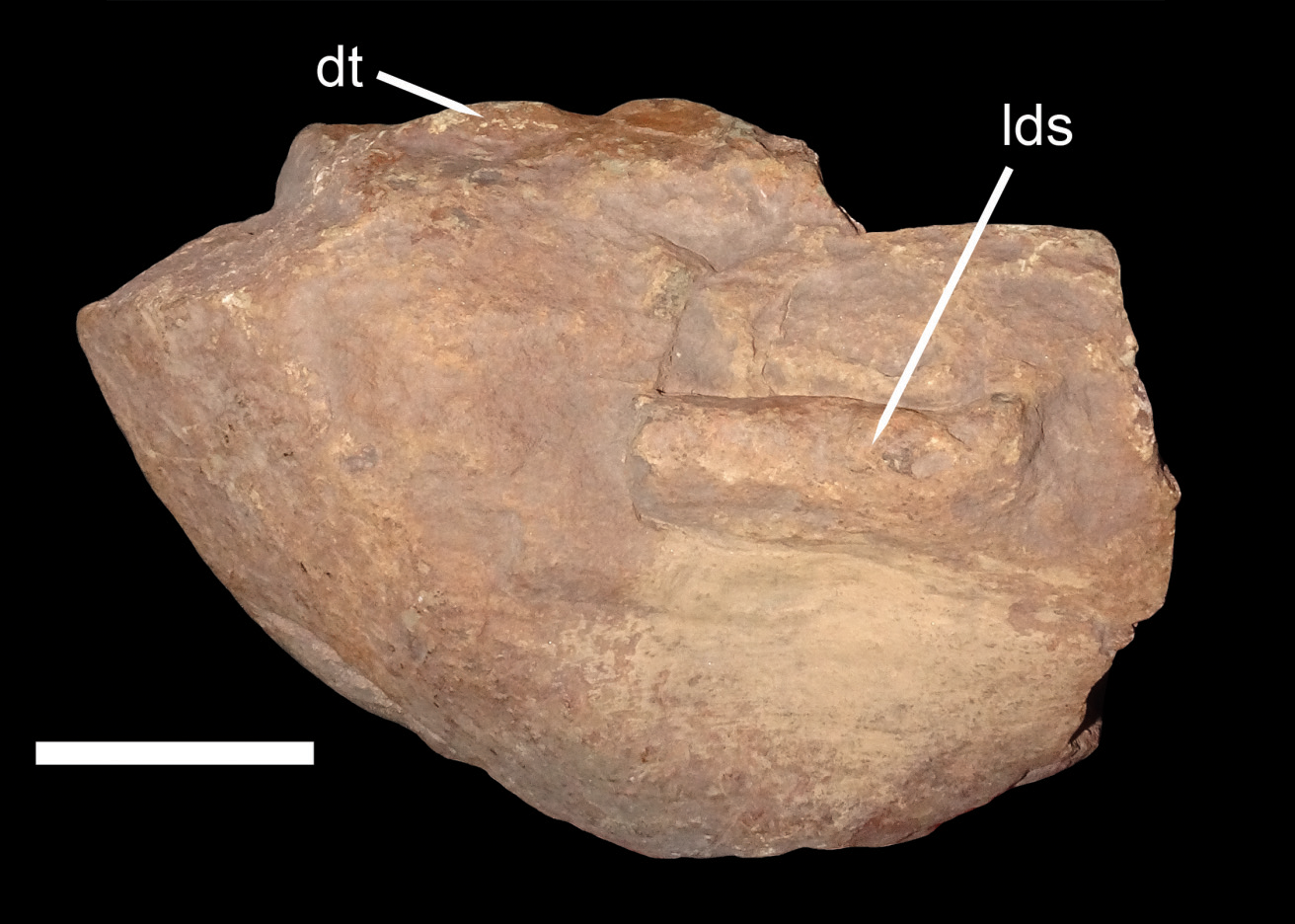
- The holotype mandible of Pentasaurus goggai (NHMW 1876-VII-B-114)

Scientific classification
- Kingdom: Animalia
- Phylum: Chordata
- Clade: Synapsida
- Clade: Therapsida
- Clade: †Anomodontia
- Clade: †Dicynodontia
- Family: †Stahleckeriidae
- Subfamily: †Placeriinae
- Genus: †Pentasaurus; Kammerer, 2018
- Species: †P. goggai

Binomial name
- †Pentasaurus goggai Kammerer, 2018

= Pentasaurus =

Pentasaurus Temporal range: Late Triassic Norian

Genus of dicynodont therapsid from the late Triassic of South Africa

Pentasaurus is an extinct genus of dicynodont of the family Stahleckeriidae, closely related to the well known Placerias. It was found in the Lower Elliot Formation of South Africa, dated to the Norian of the Late Triassic period. The genus contains the type and only species, Pentasaurus goggai. Pentasaurus is named after the ichnogenus Pentasauropus, fossil footprints that were originally described from the lower Elliot Formation in 1970 decades before the body fossils of Pentasaurus itself were recognised. Pentasauropus footprints were likely made by dicynodonts, and in South Africa Pentasaurus itself was the likely trackmaker. The name reflects the fact that a large dicynodont was predicted to have existed in the lower Elliot Formation before any body fossils were recognised, and so Pentasaurus was named after its probable footprints. This is a reversal of the more typical occurrence where fossil footprints are named after their presumed trackmakers. The name of the species honours its collector Alfred Brown, nicknamed "Gogga", which means "bug" in Afrikaans.

Pentasaurus is also unique for being one of the only known dicynodonts to have coexisted with large-bodied sauropodomorph dinosaurs. Prior to its discovery, large sauropodomorphs and dicynodonts were thought to have never ecologically coexisted, with dicynodonts either going extinct prior to large sauropodomorphs evolving or being outcompeted and driven to extinction by the herbivorous dinosaurs. Pentasaurus challenges these assumptions, suggesting that dicynodonts and large sauropodomorphs could be contemporaneous, and may instead have been separated through habitat and dietary preferences. Furthermore, Pentasaurus expands the range of stahleckeriid dicynodonts in the Late Triassic into South Africa, refuting ideas that dicynodonts were geographically restricted by the Late Triassic.

== Description ==
The fossil remains of Pentasaurus are fragmented and very incomplete, so its overall morphology is poorly understood. However, it was similarly sized to other large Late Triassic dicynodonts, such as the closely related Placerias, and likely resembled them in appearance.

=== Skull and mandible ===
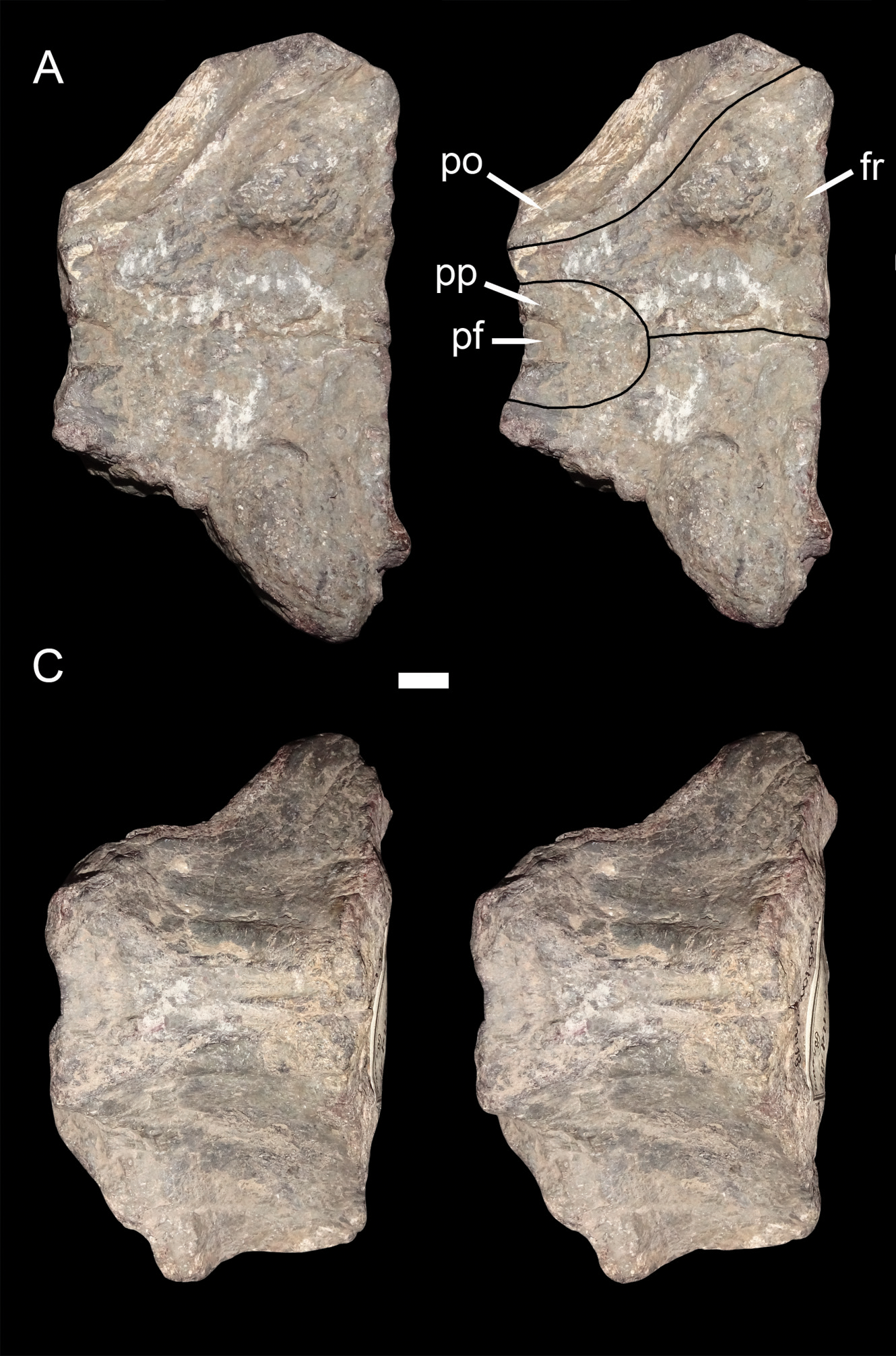
Stereopairs of the skull roof of Pentasaurus viewed from above and below

The only known bones from the skull of Pentasaurus is a portion from the roof of the skull, specifically the front end of the intertemporal region consisting of both frontal bones, the left postorbital and the preparietal (a bone unique to dicynodonts and some other therapsids). There are two depressed regions of the skull piece, one along the bottom left side and another cut into the back end, interpreted as representing a site for jaw muscle attachments at the edge of the temporal fenestra and for the pineal foramen, respectively. Otherwise, the skull is notably rough and strongly textured, particularly on a pair of mound-like rugosities at the back edge of the frontals. Frontal rugosities are absent in other kannemeyeriiforms and may be unique to Pentasaurus, although the bones around the eyes of Placerias are similarly rugose.

Only the very front of the mandible of Pentasaurus is known, mostly consisting of the fused mandibular symphysis (including the splenial) and part of the left dentary and angular, although the tip of the beak is missing. The mandible is robust, and like other dicynodonts was fused into a toothless beak. The beak was relatively short in Pentasaurus, with a steep front edge drawn into a mid-line ridge like those of other placeriines, although it is relatively shorter and lacks a pair of grooves typically found on either side of the ridge in other stahleckeriids. The beak is proportionately broader than that of Placerias, and its edges are smoothly rounded and curve towards the tip, unlike the sharp edged, flattened surfaces on the beaks of Placerias or Stahleckeria. A mid-line groove on the top surface of the beak, present in other kannemeyeriiforms, is unusually shallow in Pentasaurus, even more so than the notably shallow groove in Placerias.

The lateral dentary shelf, a characteristic ridge on the jaws of dicynodonts for attaching jaw muscles, is unusual in Pentasaurus. It is remarkably robust and prominent, and the shelf sits uniquely far forward on the jaw compared to all other dicynodonts. Further unlike other dicynodonts, the shelf does not extend back to meet the mandibular fenestra either, instead curving up at its end from an otherwise horizontal position. Features such as the shape of the beak and lateral dentary shelf likely influenced the feeding style of dicynodonts, although the significance of the unusual morphology in Pentasaurus is currently unknown.

=== Postcranial skeleton ===
The postcranial skeleton of Pentasaurus is mostly represented by the appendicular skeleton, including parts of the limbs, shoulders and pelvis, with only a single poorly preserved cervical vertebra from the neck representing the axial skeleton.

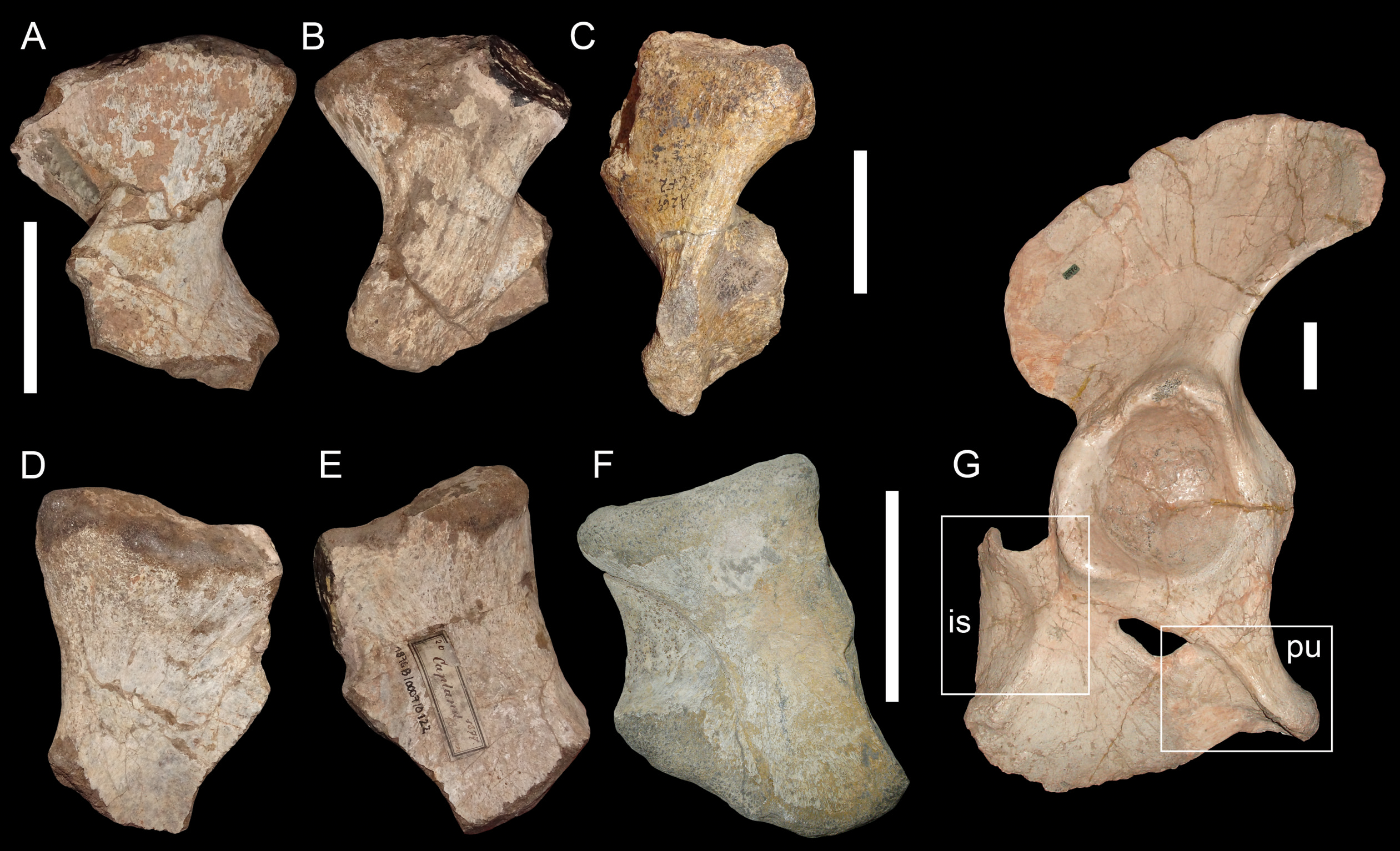
Pelvic bones of Pentasaurus compared to those of the related Placerias, Zambiasaurus and Jachaleria

The shoulder is only known from the glenoid region of the fused scapulocoracoid and is typical for stahleckeriid dicynodonts, including a relatively large glenoid opening for the shoulder joint directed back and out to the side, indicating a sprawled forelimb posture. The forelimb itself is only known from the end of the humerus and the proximal portion of the ulna. The humerus is largely typical of kannemeyeriiform dicynodonts in shape, however, the distal end is unusually large and thickened compared to other stahleckeriids. The capitulum (part of the elbow) in the only known specimen is unossified and would have been cartilaginous, suggesting the specimen may be immature compared to similarly sized specimens of Placerias. The known portion of ulna is badly worn, but the roundness of its tip suggests that Pentasaurus had a separated olecranon process of the elbow, similar to Placerias and Ischigualastia but unlike some specimens of Stahleckeria. An unidentified long bone may represent a radius.

The pelvis is known from a partial left pubis and ischium and is typical of kannemeyeriiforms, including notable 'twisting' of the pubic shaft. The only known hindlimb element is the proximal end of a right tibia, and likewise it is typical of kannemeyeriiform dicynodonts. Although similar in construction to sauropodomorph dinosaurs, the internal structure visible at the broken end shows extensive trabecular bone, characteristic of Triassic dicynodonts.

== History of discovery ==
The only known fossil remains of Pentasaurus were collected in the late 19th century by amateur palaeontologist Alfred "Gogga" Brown, an Englishman recluse who lived for much of his life in Aliwal North in the Eastern Cape Province, South Africa. His first fossil discoveries began in the 1860s, and his collections largely consisted of tetrapod fossils from the Middle Triassic Beaufort Group and Late Triassic–Early Jurassic Stormberg Group. After initially corresponding with and sending a crate of fossils to the geologist Sir Roderick Murchison in London, Brown's relationships with English and later Parisian scientists soured. However, he later accepted an invitation to have his fossils shipped to the Imperial Natural History Museum, now a part of the Natural History Museum, Vienna in Austria. The fossils of Pentasaurus were part of a lot accessioned in 1876 that was determined to have been collected from a single locality in the Norian aged lower Elliot Formation, based on the shared brown-grey colour of the bones and brown sandstone matrix surrounding them, as well as the association with fossils of the exclusively lower Elliot dinosaur Eucnemesaurus.

Prior to the recognition of Pentasaurus body fossils, dicynodonts were inferred to have been present in the lower Elliot Formation from preserved footprints and track ways attributed to them. These ichnofossils were described in 1970 as Pentasauropus incredibilis, and were determined to have most likely been produced by dicynodonts from their large size and five short toes (pentadactyly). Similar trace fossils were identified on other continents, including South and North America, where they were more confidently attributed to large dicynodonts. However, the absence of dicynodont fossils in some localities known to produce Pentasauropus, as well as their younger age compared to known dicynodont genera, led palaeontologists Adrian Hunt and Spencer Lucas to question this identification.

Re-examination of Brown's collections in the 21st century revealed that a number of bones belonged to a large dicynodont, and in 2018 they were described by palaeontologist Christian Kammerer as a new genus and species, Pentasaurus goggai. The generic name was derived from the ichnogenus Pentasauropus due to the likely association between the tracks and their track maker. Such nomenclatural associations are not uncommon in palaeontology (e.g. Anchisauripus, Megalosauropus). However, typically the ichnofossil is named after the presumed track maker, whereas this situation is reversed in Pentasaurus. The specific epithet is named in honour and recognition of Alfred Brown and his work, derived from his nickname 'Gogga' (pronounced /ˈxɒxə/), an Afrikaan word loosely translated to "bug" that the local villagers nicknamed him for this unusual habits.

Pentasaurus is only known from several isolated fragments of bone, of which a partial mandible (NHMW 1876-VII-B-114) was made the holotype specimen. However, because the bones were collected from one locality and that none of them are duplicated, as well as their similar sizes, it is possible that they all belong to only a single individual. Although disarticulated from each other, the known bones are characteristic of dicynodonts and cannot be referred to other large animals known from the Elliot Formation, such as 'rauisuchians' or sauropodomorph dinosaurs. The inferred association between Pentasaurus and Pentasauropus incredibilis tracks cannot be definitively proven, as there are no known bones from the hands and feet to compare with the shape of the tracks. However, Pentasaurus is the only known candidate dicynodont track-maker in the Elliot Formation, and as other Norian localities are only ever known to have supported one species of dicynodont, it is almost certain that Pentasaurus produced the Pentasauropus tracks originally identified from the Elliot Formation.

== Classification ==
Although fragmentary, the known remains of Pentasaurus are clearly dicynodont and are consistent with belonging to the only known family of Late Triassic dicynodonts, the Stahleckeriidae. Furthermore, a number of features of the lower jaw and humerus support its position in the stahleckeriid subfamily Placeriinae, and so as a close relative of the North American Placerias, Moroccan Moghreberia and the giant Polish Lisowicia. A phylogenetic analysis performed by Kammerer (2018) supported this relationship, however, it could not resolve the relationships within Placeriinae beyond a polytomy containing Pentasaurus and all other placeriines, as shown in the cladogram reproduced below. Later phylogenetic analyses including Pentasaurus produced the same results.

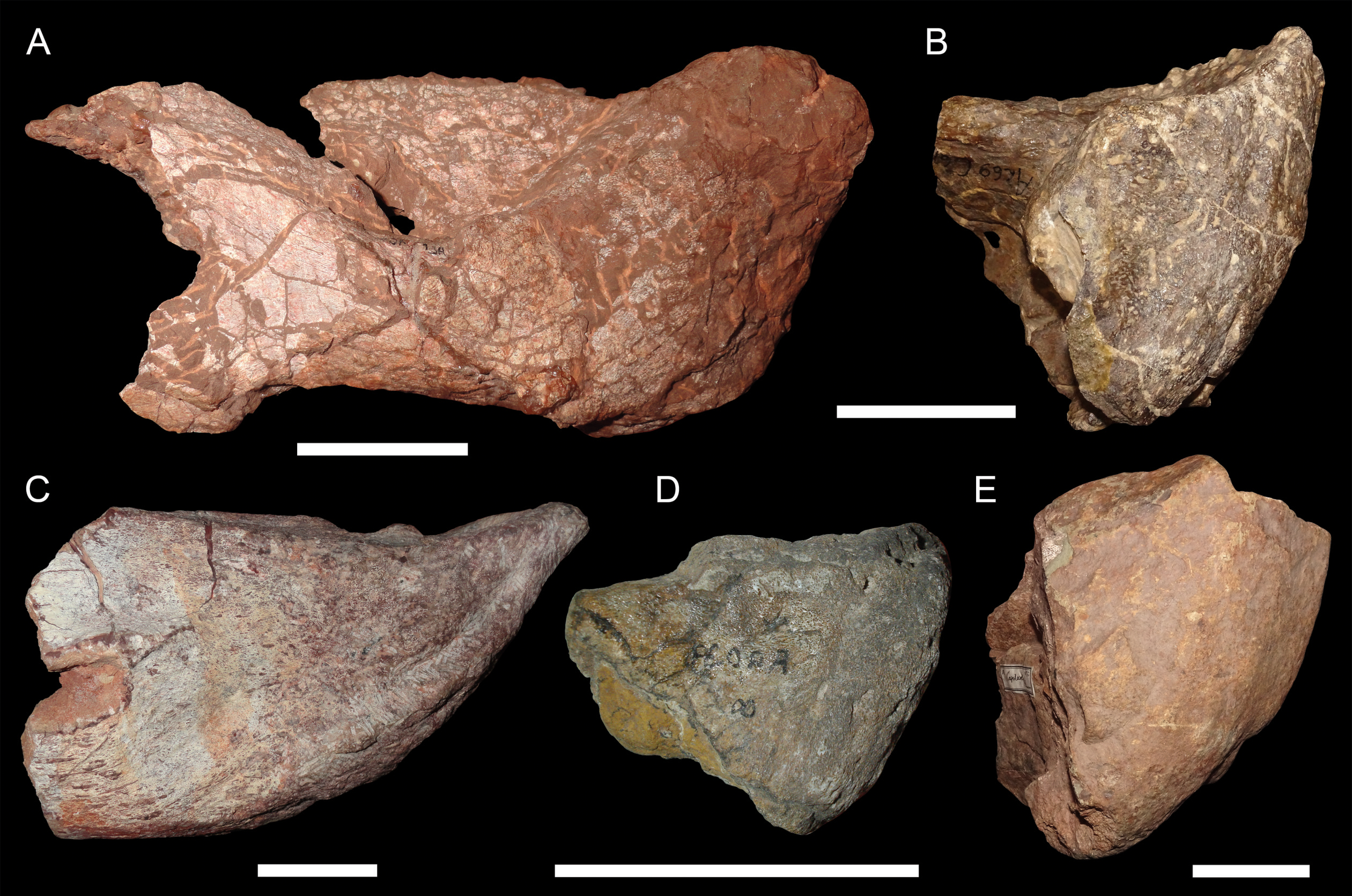
The beak of Pentasaurus compared to those of other stahleckeriids

- Stahleckeriidae
  - Placeriinae
    - Pentasaurus
    - Moghreberia
    - Placerias
    - Zambiasaurus
  - Stahleckeriinae
    - Sangusaurus
    - Stahleckeria
    - - Eubrachiosaurus
      - - Ischigualastia
        - Jachaleria

The precise relationships of Pentasaurus to other placeriines cannot be determined cladistically due to the incompleteness of the known remains, nonetheless, it can still be readily distinguished from other placeriines. Particularly, Pentasaurus is characterised by the rounder shape of the beak on its lower jaw, compared to the more angular, straight edged beaks of Placerias and Moghreberia. The robustness and position of the lateral dentary shelf far forward on the lower jaw is also unique to Pentasaurus among dicynodonts, as well as the thickness of its distal humerus. The paired mound-like rugosities over its frontals may also be a diagnostic trait of Pentasaurus.

== Palaeoecology ==
The lower Elliot Formation consists mostly of red-purple mudstones and thick, stacked layers of sandstone deposited by meandering river channels on a floodplain. The relatively narrow width (tens of metres) of the sandstone channels indicate that the river channels were stable and did not migrate across the floodplain, and sedimentary structures preserved within the sandstone indicate that the rivers were slow-moving and perennial. The stability of the channels suggests that riparian forests were present along the banks of these rivers, which is further supported by the relatively high abundance of fossilised wood fragments found in the lower Elliot Formation. These riparian environments were separated by extensive floodplains that were less well vegetated, but likewise they show little evidence for desiccation. Overall, the evidence is consistent with a humid to semi-arid climate in the lower Elliot Formation, and was a wetter environment than the dry, arid upper Elliot Formation of the proceeding Early Jurassic.

The fauna of the lower Elliot Formation is poorly known compared to the upper Elliot Formation, but they show some similarities to other Norian-aged faunas globally. Only two others therapsid are known from the lower Elliot Formation, the large herbivore Scalenodontoides, a traversodontid cynodont and the small trithelodontid cynodont Elliotherium. Archosaurs are better represented, though mostly by several species of herbivorous sauropodomorph dinosaurs. Eucnemesaurus was collected together with Pentasaurus, and so very likely coexisted with it, but Pentasaurus may also have occurred with Blikanasaurus, Sefapanosaurus and Meroktenos, as well as perhaps Melanorosaurus and Plateosauravus depending on their stratigraphic positions. Predatory archosaurs are less well known, but include probable 'rauisuchian' remains, including portions of jaws and teeth that were collected with Pentasaurus. Predatory theropod dinosaurs were also present, but are only known from isolated teeth and footprints. Temnospondyl amphibians are also known from the lower Elliot Formation, but consist of only of chigutisaurids. The footprint record from the lower Elliot Formation records a similar set of fauna to those known from body fossils, although a singular footprint may indicate that crocodylomorphs were also present.

=== Biogeography ===
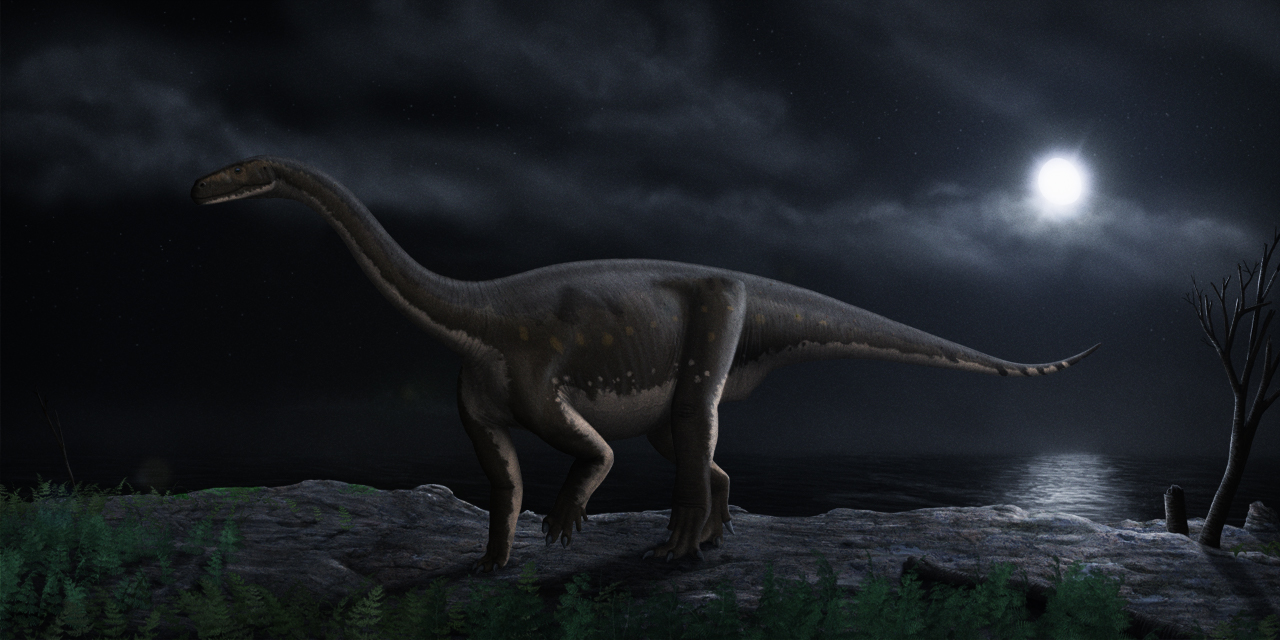
The lower Elliot sauropodomorph Melanorosaurus readi, a possible contemporary of Pentasaurus

The coexistence of Pentasaurus with large sauropodomorph dinosaurs including as Eucnemesaurus in the Elliot Formation is significant, as dicynodonts and large sauropodomorphs are otherwise not known to have coexisted anywhere else in world. Prior to the discovery of Pentasaurus, it was even suggested that the two groups of herbivores never even coexisted at all, and that sauropodomorphs replaced dicynodonts as large herbivores in most Late Triassic ecosystems, either through ecological turnover or by direct competition. The coexistence of Pentasaurus and large sauropodomorphs in the lower Elliot Formation suggests that this may not be the case, and that the two groups may have instead been segregated by habitat preference, and may have fed upon different types of vegetation.

Pentasaurus also represents the southernmost example of a placeriine in the world, refuting prior suggestions that placeriine dicynodonts were mostly restricted to the northern hemisphere and demonstrating instead that the group had a more global distribution.
