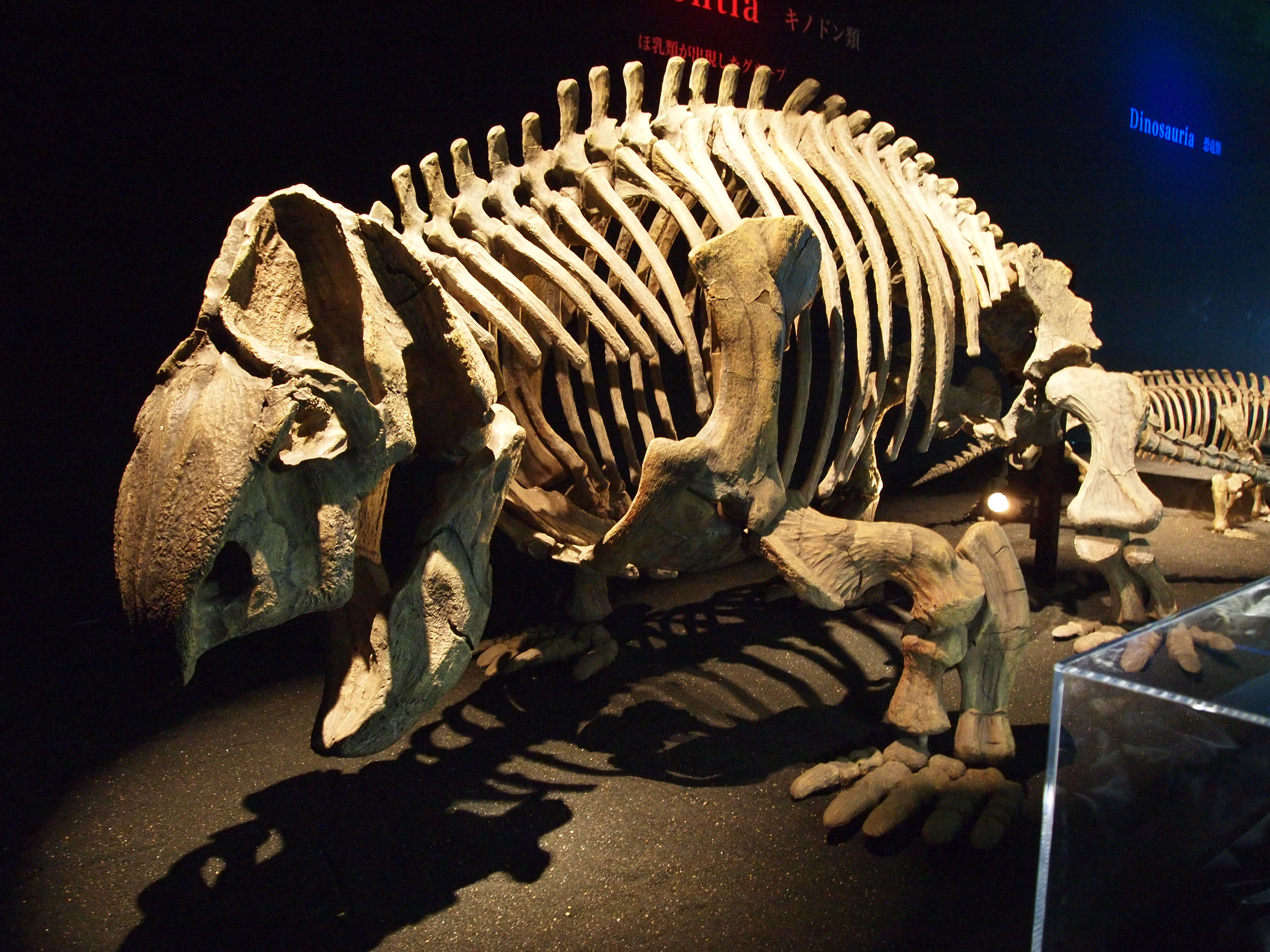
- An Ischigualastia jenseni replica skeleton on display in Japan.

Scientific classification
- Kingdom: Animalia
- Phylum: Chordata
- Clade: Synapsida
- Clade: Therapsida
- Clade: †Anomodontia
- Clade: †Dicynodontia
- Family: †Stahleckeriidae
- Subfamily: †Stahleckeriinae
- Genus: †Ischigualastia; Cox 1962

Type species
- †Ischigualastia jenseni Cox, 1962

= Ischigualastia =

Ischigualastia Temporal range: Late Carnian, ~231.4–229 Ma

Extinct genus of dicynodonts

Ischigualastia is an extinct genus of large dicynodont therapsids from the Late Triassic (Carnian) Ischigualasto Formation of Argentina (from which the genus takes its name). The type species and only known species, I. jenseni, was named in 1962 by C. Barry Cox, who wrote a more detailed description three years later. The species name honours James Jensen, who prepared some of the earliest fossils. There are some reports of Ischigualastia remains outside of Argentina, though these do not hold up to scrutiny.

Ischigualastia was a large dicynodont, with an estimated body mass of 1,000 kg (2,200 lb). Its skull would have measured up to 60 cm (2.0 ft) in length; the holotype skull, the specimen on which the genus is founded, measured 55 cm (1.80 ft) in length and 46 cm (1.51 ft) in width. Like some other stahleckeriids, Ischigualastia had a pair of large protrusions towards the front of its upper jaw. Known as caniniform processes, these structures superficially resemble tusks (and in some genera, such as Placerias, did support them). Ischigualastia had deep zygomatic arches (cheek bones) which were angled upwards. The shoulder bones of Ischigualastia are very robust.

Like other Late Triassic dicynodonts, Ischigualastia is a member of the family Stahleckeriidae, though it was originally assigned to Kannemeyeriidae. It was among the largest herbivores of the Ischigualasto Formation, alongside its later relative, Jachaleria.

== Discovery ==
Ischigualastia was briefly named by C. Barry Cox in 1962, with a larger description published in 1965. It is one of the better-known South American dicynodonts in terms of its variety of fossils, including several nearly complete skulls. Cox named the genus after its location of discovery, the Ischigualasto Valley, while the species honors James Jensen, who prepared some of its fossils.

The holotype, MACN 18.055, is a skull stored at the Museo Argentino de Ciencias Naturales "Bernardino Rivadavia" (MACN) in Buenos Aires. Though partially "restored" with plaster, it still closely resembles unaltered skulls. Cox in 1965 also discussed Ischigualastia fossils collected by the Museum of Comparative Zoology (MCZ) in Cambridge, Massachusetts. Additional fossils are housed at the Instituto Miguel Lillo (PVL) in Tucumán and Universidad Nacional de San Juan (PVSJ) in San Juan. However, they have yet to be fully described.

There are a few reports of Ischigualastia fossils from New Mexico, Texas, and India: a femur, a snout fragment, and a poorly-preserved skull, respectively. These claims have not held up to scrutiny, since the fossils in question do not closely resemble Ischigualastia in particular. Supposed Ischigualastia fossils from Brazil are more likely to be Jachaleria, Sangusaurus, or a new unnamed species.

== Description ==
Size of Ischigualastia compared to a human

Ischigualastia is a member of the family Stahleckeriidae, a clade which includes some of the biggest dicynodonts. It is similar in stature to the North American stahleckeriid Placerias, which measured around 3.5 metres (11 ft) long and weighed up to 800–1,000 kilograms (1,800–2,200 lb). Indeed, Lucas Fiorelli and colleagues estimated in 2013 that the holotype specimen of Ischigualastia would have weighed around 1,000 kg (2,200 lb).

=== Skull ===
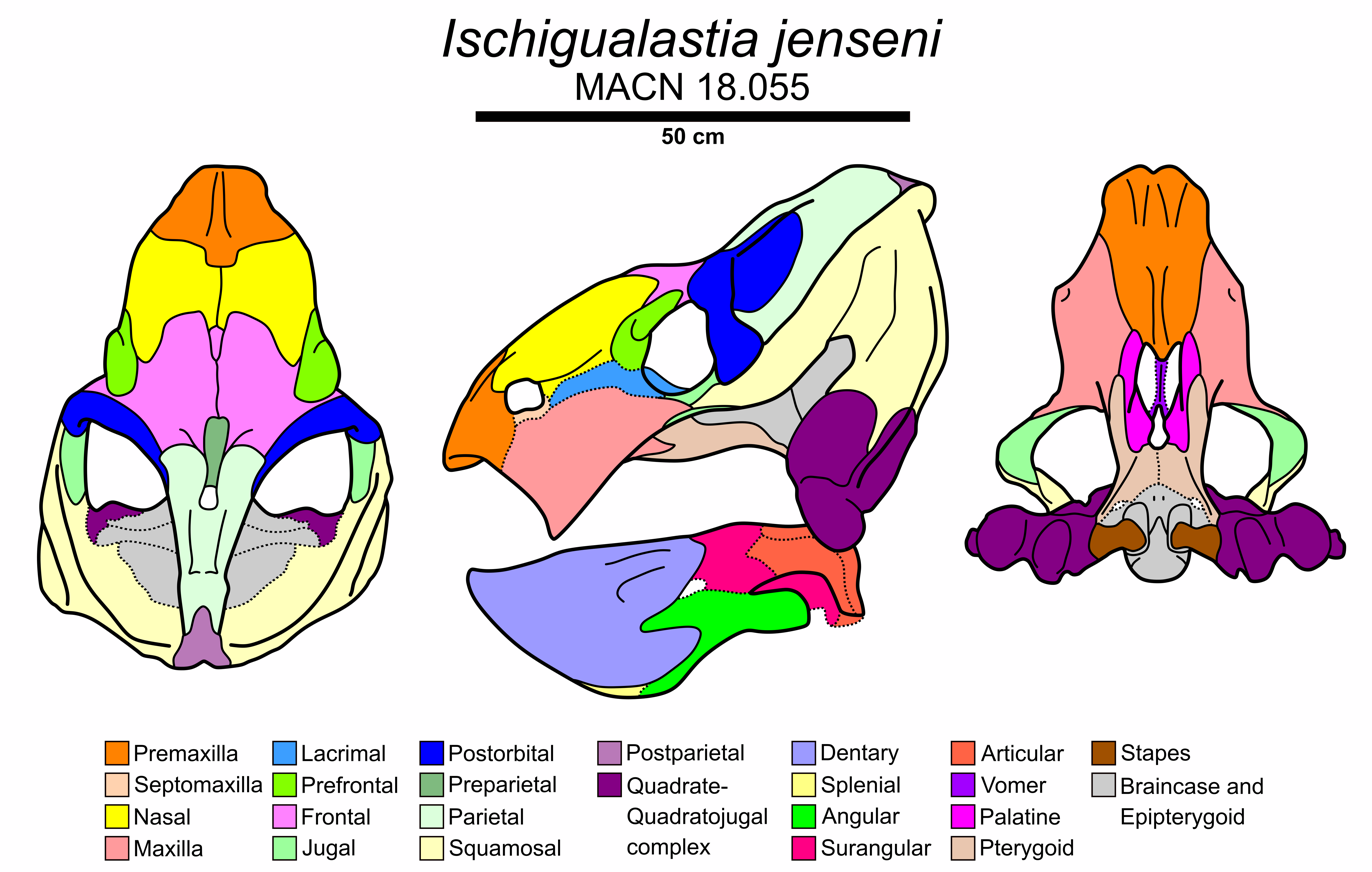
Skull diagram, based on the robust (male?) skull of the holotype

Ischigualastia is a very large dicynodont. The skull had a maximum known length of 60 cm (2.0 ft), though the holotype skull measured 55 cm (1.80 ft) long and 46 cm (1.51 ft) across. The skull was deep and bore pointed projections (known as caniniform processes) on each side of the snout, rather than true tusks; this condition is seen in several other stahleckeriids. The back of the skull is steeply sloped and has particularly large spaces for vertical jaw muscles, suitable for a strong bite. In contrast, many earlier tusked dicynodonts had low skulls which were better suited for propalinal (front-to-back) jaw movement during a bite.

In many respects, Ischigualastia is similar to a nearby relative, Jachaleria, though there are a few traits entirely unique to the skull of Ischigualastia. The top of the snout has a narrow depression, known as the interfrontal fossa, near where the frontal bones contact the nasal bones; the presence of this structure is unique among kannemeyeriiforms, though may be connected to an additional bone between the nasals in Jachaleria. The pineal foramen, a hole further back on the forehead, has swollen rims. Finally, the zygomatic arch (roughly equivalent to the cheekbone) is deep and strongly bent upwards.

=== Vertebral column ===
Parts of Ischigualastia's vertebral column (backbone) are known; though the actual column is fragmentary, most of the preserved bones are complete, though too little is known for them to be put in order. A cervical (neck) rib is known which is unusually double-headed. Almost the entirety of the ribcage is also two-headed, albeit less so, with each head separated by a small notch (save for the very smallest, which was only one-headed and lacked a notch). Five sacral vertebrae appear to have been present.

=== Pectoral and pelvic girdles, and limbs ===
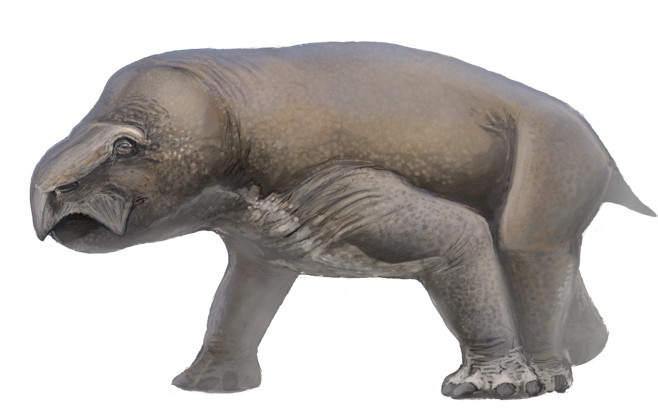
Life reconstruction

The scapula (shoulder blade) of Ischigualastia is extremely robust and slightly curved. It lacks an acromion process, although a ridge dividing the infraspinatus and supraspinatus muscles was present in its place. The sternum is pinched thin anterior to (in front of) where the ribs would have attached. The only preserved humerus of I. jenseni is flattened so badly that the proximal (away from the body) and distal (towards the body) expansions are almost adjacent to one another. The deltopectoral crest is well-developed. The semi-lunar facet of the ulna is large, taking up around half of its length and the entirety of its width. The diaphysis (shaft) is very short and slender compared to the olecranon and semi-lunar facet.

Ischigualastia's ilium is fairly wide anteroposteriorly (from front-to-back) over the acetabulum (the cavity where the femur, or thigh bone, articulates). The femur is well-preserved. Its head is well-developed, medial to the shaft and separated by a strongly constricted neck. The greater trochanter is strongly developed. Most of the tibia is missing, and the fibula and pes (foot) are completely unknown.

=== Sexual dimorphism ===
Ischigualastia, Stahleckeria, and Placerias all show evidence of sexual dimorphism, meaning that there are strong differences between the skulls of proposed males and females. Robust Ischigualastia skulls, interpreted as males, have a distinctly broader snout and intertemporal area, as well as rugose (rough) patches on the nasal bones.

== Classification ==
In 1965, C. Barry Cox suggested that Ischigualastia belonged to the family Kannemeyeriidae. Ischigualastia is now recognised as a member of the family Stahleckeriidae, alongside other Late Triassic dicynodonts such as Placerias and Lisowicia. In particular, it is generally considered part of the subfamily Stahleckeriinae, most closely related to Jachaleria.

Below is a cladogram from Kammerer and Ordoñez (2021):

- Stahleckeriidae
  - Placeriinae
    - Zambiasaurus
    - - Moghreberia
      - - Pentasaurus
        - Placerias
  - Stahleckeriinae
    - - Stahleckeria
      - Ufudocyclops
    - - Sangusaurus
      - - Eubrachiosaurus
        - - Ischigualastia
          - Jachaleria

Below is a cladogram from Szczygielski and Sulej (2023):

- Stahleckeriidae
  - Placeriinae
    - Zambiasaurus
    - - Pentasaurus
      - - Lisowicia
        - - Moghreberia
          - Placerias
  - Stahleckeriinae
    - Stahleckeria
    - - Eubrachiosaurus
      - - Sangusaurus
        - - Ischigualastia
          - Jachaleria

== Paleoecology ==
Ischigualastia was a large quadrupedal herbivore found in late Carnian-age strata of the Ischigualasto Formation (La Peña, Cancha de Bochas, and earliest Valle de la Luna members). It was a relatively common component of the local fauna, although not as abundant as the medium-sized herbivores Hyperodapedon and Exaeretodon. It was one of the two dicynodonts which lived in the Ischigualasto Formation, the other being Jachaleria, a close relative which is only found in the youngest layers of the formation. The largest carnivores in the formation were the pseudosuchian Saurosuchus and the common predatory dinosaur Herrerasaurus.

Ischigualastia and Placerias were each among the last and largest dicynodonts of the Late Triassic, though they were surpassed in both regards by Lisowicia, a huge late-surviving stahleckeriid from Poland.

== See also ==
- Stahleckeriidae
- List of therapsids
