= Alfred Brown (palaeontologist) =

South African palaeontologist (1834–1920)

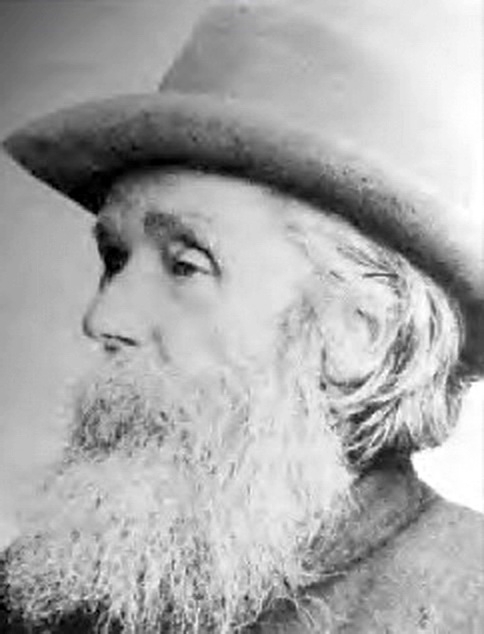
- Born: 26 April 1834; Cirencester
- Died: 29 June 1920 (aged 86); Aliwal North
- Known for: Discovering the extinct animal Pentasaurus and ichnoanimal Pentasauropus
- Scientific career
- Fields: Palaeontologist, archaeologist and naturalist

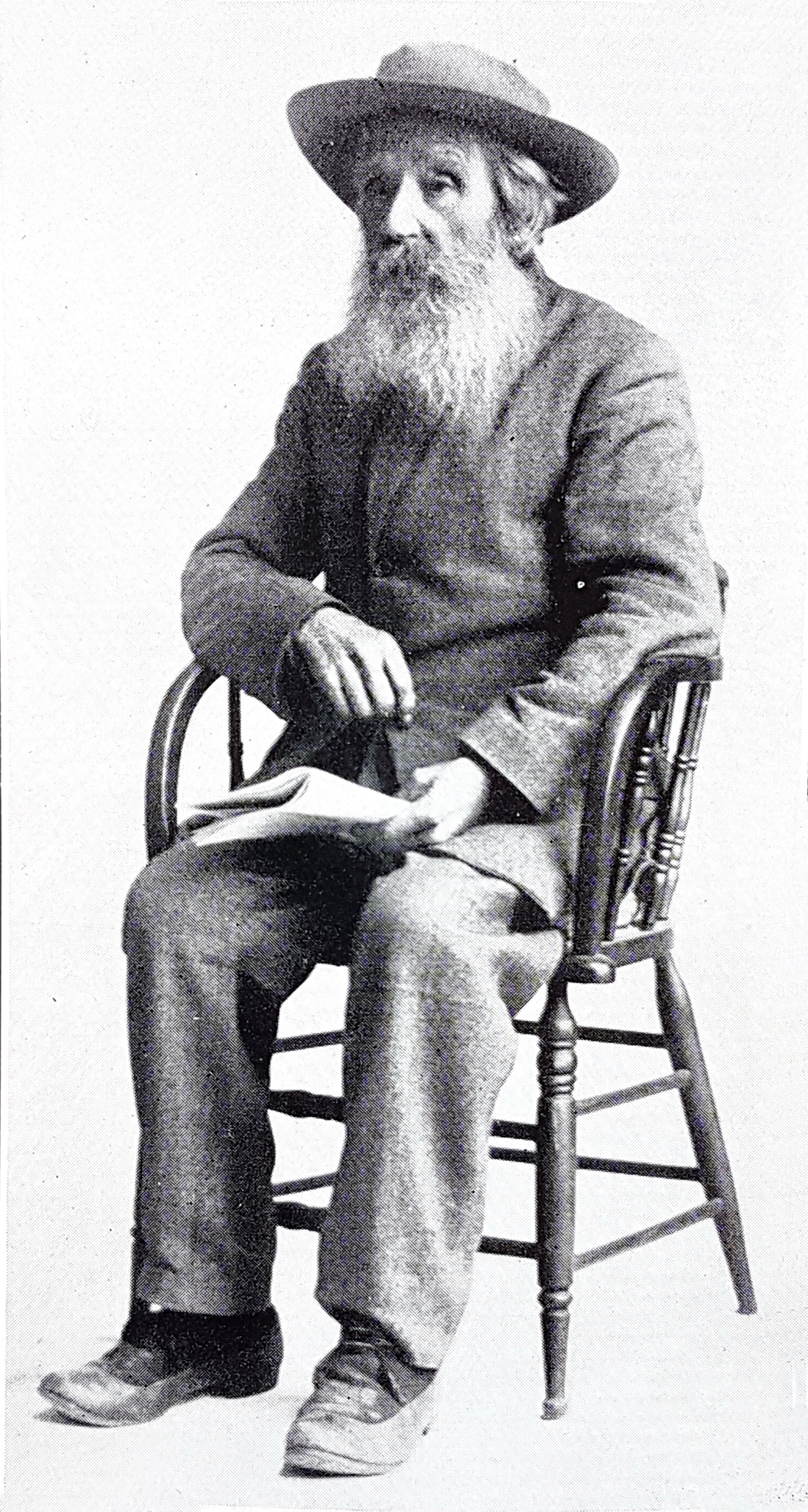

Alfred Brown aka Gogga Brown (26 April 1834 Cirencester - 29 June 1920 Aliwal North) was an English-born South African palaeontologist, archaeologist and naturalist whose contributions to science were considerable. Brown discovered 21 new species of fossil reptiles and dinosaurs, a large number of which were described by Robert Broom and Harry Seeley. The defunct genus Browniella and some ten fossil species were named in his honour. Brown's fossils included 7 new species of Triassic fishes, some found by other collectors, three of which were named after him. Brown published a solitary article on his finds - "The Dicynodon", appearing in the Cape Monthly Magazine (2nd series, 1874, Vol. 9, pp. 83–89). Despite having had no formal training in palaeontology, archaeology or natural history, Brown possessed an enquiring and orderly mind.

Alfred Brown was born on 26 April 1834 in Cirencester, England. Very little is known of Brown's early years. Though he kept a detailed journal that covered most of his life, the portion that presumably described his youth was deliberately removed. Alfred Brown was educated at the Borough Road Normal College, London, and taught at Thrapstone and Penrith during 1857 and 1858. He was well-read in the sciences with a good command of Latin and Greek.

He arrived at Port Elizabeth in 1858, having survived a bout of confluent smallpox on the voyage, and set off to teach in Bloemfontein, but found the post already filled, so that he moved to Aliwal North, remaining there for the rest of his life. In February 1859 he started teaching, often waiving a fee from poverty-stricken parents. In 1860 he took up a post as the town's first librarian, a duty he discharged for 41 years. He filled the role of postmaster and postman from about 1863 to 1882, and in 1865 was appointed as clerk to the resident magistrate; the income from these minor offices amounted to a pittance and Brown remained poor all his life.

Brown's consuming interest in fossils was sparked by the surveyor and anthropologist, Joseph Millerd Orpen. The Burgersdorp Formation and the Stormberg Series proved to be a rich source of material, and an undemanding work schedule left Brown with ample time to pursue his interest in natural history. He soon possessed thousands of fossils specimens and archaeological artefacts, and boasted a library of some 2000 books on a wide variety of topics. Some 350 specimens were sent to the comparative anatomist Thomas Henry Huxley, including parts of what seemed like a megalosaurus and eventually named Euskelosaurus browni in Brown's honour. Specimens also went to the geologist Roderick Murchison, but neither Huxley nor Murchison sent Brown copies of the journals in which his finds were described. Still undeterred, Brown sent specimens to the National Museum of Natural History in Paris and in return received some geology and palaeontology books and a collection of 47 fossil shells which he donated to the Albany Museum in 1873. Fossils to the Imperial Natural History Museum in Vienna were ignored. In 1889 the British palaeontologist Harry Seeley visited South Africa, called on Brown and borrowed a substantial number of fossils which were never returned - consequently, some fifteen years later, Brown gifted them to the British Museum of Natural History.

He also collected fossil plants from near Aliwal North, some 500 specimens laying the groundwork of the Burgersdorp Formation palaeoflora. His collection was studied by the naturalist Edgar Leopold Layard who named one of the species Odontopteris browni. After his intestate death his fossil collection was put up for auction and acquired by the South African Museum. Broom regarded it as most valuable since it included several type specimens and an outstanding set of South African fossil fish. Brown also made detailed notes on the stratigraphy of the Stormberg Series, though these were never published.

He had an enduring interest in the life history and habits of the Cape monitor, Varanus albigularis, keeping some 40 of the animals. He felt that studying the extant reptile would provide a valuable insight into the interpretation of reptile fossils. His observations and thoughts were published in the Anglo-African in May 1869 and in the Cape Monthly Magazine (2nd series, Vol. 3, pp. 24–34) in July 1871.

His interest in archaeology may be traced back to 1870 when he contributed to an article on Stone implements in South Africa by Langham Dale, in the Cape Monthly Magazine (2nd series, Vol. 1, pp. 366–367) in which he described rock shelters from near Zastron and other sites. He gathered a large number of stone artefacts and excavated several caves, but refused to give Louis Péringuey access to the collection. These artefacts were not marked and careless transporting after his death by the South African Museum resulted in a jumbled pile of little value to science.

Brown was short, had an unkempt appearance, was a teetotaller and non-smoker, and had firm religious convictions. His unusual interest in natural history led to his being dubbed "Gogga" Brown by the local people. He had a retiring nature, shunned intimacy and adopted the lifestyle of a hermit, but at the same time valued his friendship with Daniel Rossouw Kannemeyer, a fellow palaeontologist and collector from nearby Burgersdorp. He maintained a meticulous journal which ran to some 17 volumes, comprising a rich source of information on his life.
