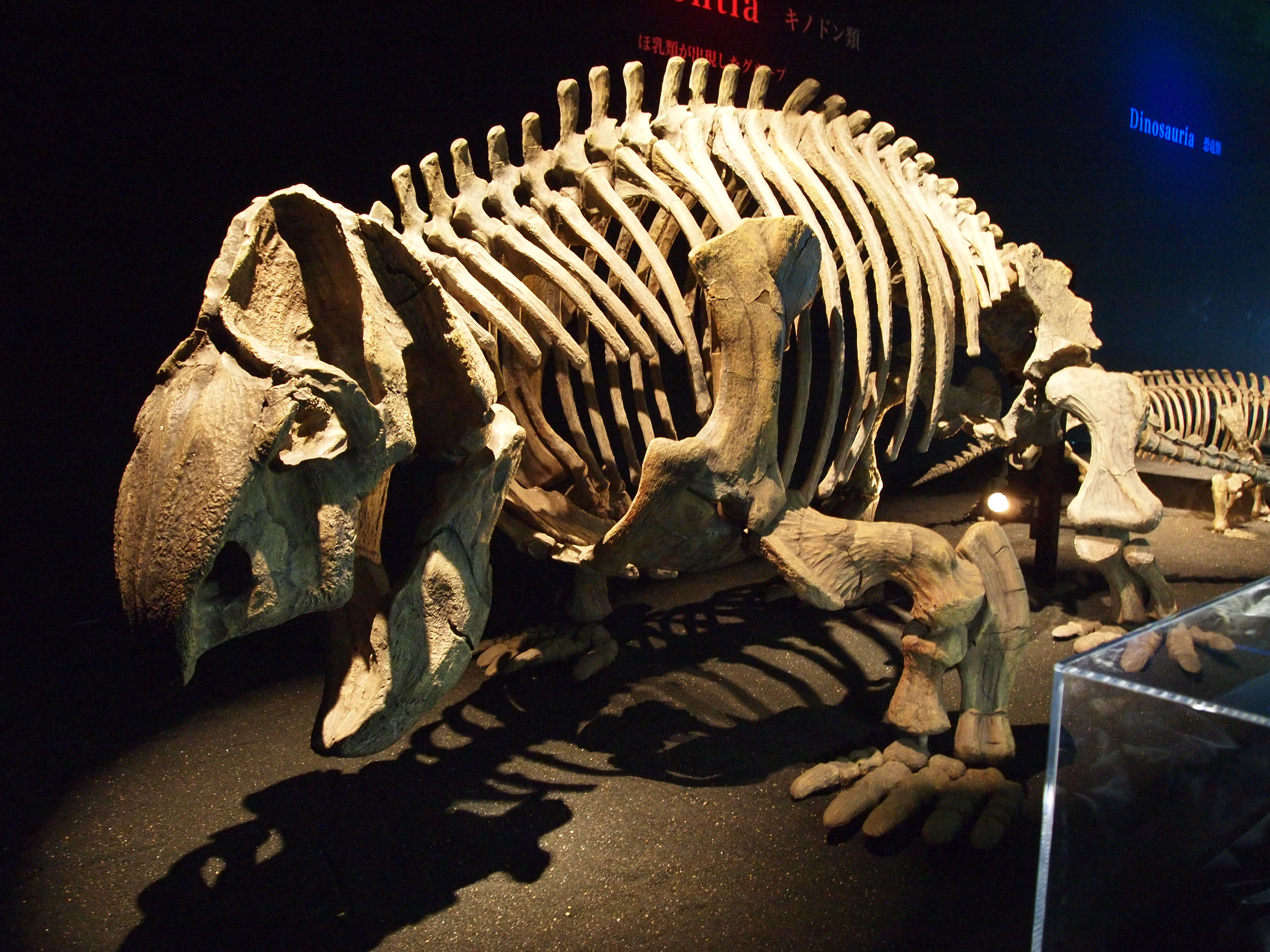
- Mounted skeleton of Ischigualastia jenseni

Scientific classification
- Kingdom: Animalia
- Phylum: Chordata
- Clade: Synapsida
- Clade: Therapsida
- Clade: †Anomodontia
- Clade: †Dicynodontia
- Clade: †Kannemeyeriiformes
- Family: †Stahleckeriidae; Cox, 1965

Subgroups
- †Sungeodon?; †Woznikella; †Placeriinae; †Argodicynodon; †Lisowicia; †Moghreberia; †Placerias; †Pentasaurus; †Zambiasaurus; †Stahleckeriinae; †Eubrachiosaurus; †Ischigualastia; †Jachaleria; †Sangusaurus; †Stahleckeria; †Ufudocyclops

= Stahleckeriidae =

Stahleckeriids Temporal range: Triassic, Induan–Rhaetian

Extinct family of dicynodonts

Stahleckeriidae is a family of large dicynodont therapsids whose fossils are known from the Triassic of North America, South America, Asia and Africa.

== Classification ==
=== Phylogeny ===
Below is a cladogram from Szczygielski and Sulej (2023):

- Stahleckeriidae
  - Placeriinae
    - Zambiasaurus
    - - Pentasaurus
      - - Lisowicia
        - - Moghreberia
          - Placerias
  - Stahleckeriinae
    - Stahleckeria
    - - Eubrachiosaurus
      - - Sangusaurus
        - - Ischigualastia
          - Jachaleria

=== Genera ===
Genus	Status	Age	Location	Description	Images
Argodicynodon	Valid	Norian	United States		
Eubrachiosaurus	Valid	Norian	United States		
Ischigualastia	Valid	Carnian	Argentina		
Lisowicia	Valid	Late Norian — Early Rhaetian?	Poland		
Jachaleria	Valid	Norian	Argentina and Brazil		
Moghreberia	Valid	Carnian	Morocco		
Placerias	Valid	Norian	United States		
Pentasaurus	Valid	Norian	South Africa		
Sangusaurus	Valid	Anisian	Zambia		
Stahleckeria	Valid	Ladinian	Brazil and Namibia		
Sungeodon?	Valid	Induan	China	Initially identified as a stahleckeriid, possibly a more basal genus.	
Ufudocyclops	Valid	Anisian?	South Africa		
Woznikella	Valid	Carnian	Germany and Poland		
Zambiasaurus	Valid	Anisian	Zambia		
