= Sungeodon =

Sungeodon Temporal range: Early Triassic, 251.3 Ma

Scientific classification
- Domain: Eukaryota
- Kingdom: Animalia
- Phylum: Chordata
- Clade: Synapsida
- Clade: Therapsida
- Suborder: †Anomodontia
- Clade: †Dicynodontia
- Family: †Stahleckeriidae
- Genus: †Sungeodon; Maisch and Matzke, 2014

Type species
- †Sungeodon kimkraemerae Maisch and Matzke, 2014

Extinct genus of dicynodonts

Sungeodon is an extinct genus of dicynodont therapsid from the Early Triassic of China. It is known from a single type species, Sungeodon kimkraemerae, which was named in 2014. Sungeodon is the earliest member of a group of dicynodonts called Kannemeyeriiformes, which would radiate later in the Triassic to become the dominant large herbivores of terrestrial ecosystems. Before its discovery no kannemeyeriiform dicynodonts were known from the Early Triassic. The presence of Sungeodon in the earliest Triassic Jiucaiyuan Formation indicates that dicynodonts diversified soon after the Permian-Triassic extinction event, mirroring the explosive radiations of other tetrapod groups such as archosaurs soon after the extinction.
