= Daniel Rossouw Kannemeyer =

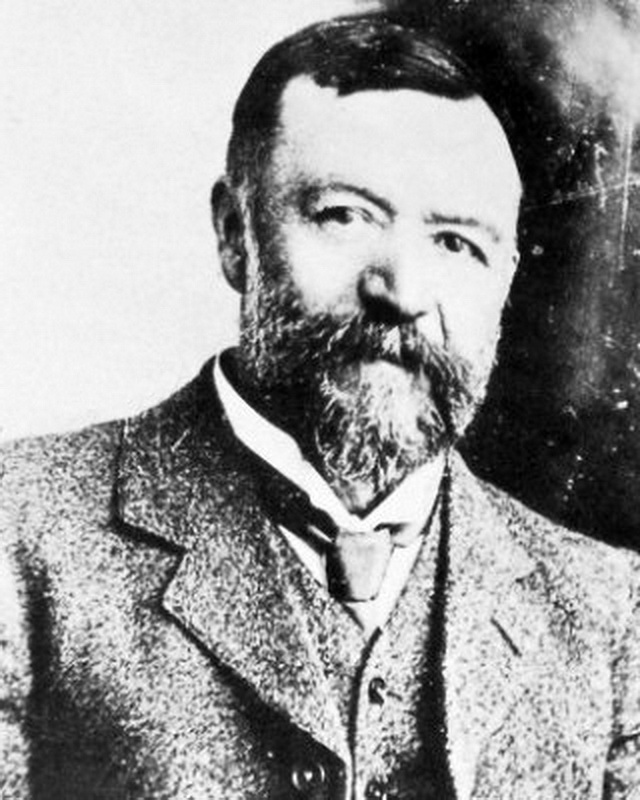
- Born: 26 December 1843; Cape Town
- Died: 1 January 1925 (aged 81); Bloemfontein
- Occupation: medical practitioner
- Known for: naturalist, archaeologist and palaeontologist

Daniel Rossouw Kannemeyer (26 December 1843 Cape Town – 1 January 1925 Bloemfontein) was a South African medical practitioner, naturalist, archaeologist and palaeontologist, the son of Daniel Gerhardus Kannemeyer and Johanna Susanna Rossouw He is best remembered for his contributions to palaeontology and archaeology although his collections of zoological specimens are greatly valued by the museums which acquired them.

Kannemeyer's family settled in Burgersdorp in the Eastern Cape around 1848. Daniel was a pupil at the South African College in Cape Town between 1859 and 1863. Next he qualified in 1871 as Bachelor of Medicine (MB) and was later licensed to practice by the Royal College of Physicians of Edinburgh. During that same period he married Helen Hill of Edinburgh in November 1871. The couple returned to Burgersdorp and Kannemeyer practised there, in Aliwal North and Smithfield for the next forty years. His wife was locally acclaimed for her soprano voice, while he served on the school board and delivered numerous public lectures on archaeology and natural history. Kannemeyer volunteered to serve in the Ninth Frontier War of 1877-1879, and in the campaigns against Moorosi and the Basuto in 1879 and 1880, his medical training proving to be invaluable.

Kannemeyer was responsible for collecting most of the Free State entomological and herpetological specimens housed in the South African Museum. The records show that he collected from Smithfield between 1908 and 1914. His collection of artefacts from the district defined the Smithfield culture, regarded as a Later Stone Age hunting and gathering culture active between 1300-1700 AD, and on the same level as that of the Mesolithic people of Europe or the modern Kalahari bushmen. The hallmark of their industry was the virtual absence of backed microliths and tiny semicircular scrapers.

In 1884 he also presented the Museum with his collection of cynodont fossils from the Stormberg coal beds, and subsequently donated to the Albany Museum in Grahamstown. He collaborated with the naturalist Roland Trimen in studying butterflies, and with the visiting palaeontologist Harry Seeley in 1888/9, loaning Seeley many of his fossil specimens which, as in the case of Alfred Brown, were never returned. He gathered extensive information on Bushman lore and on the medicinal properties of local plants.

He was loath to publish any of his findings, preferring to leave that to career palaeontologists. He did publish a Note on Locusts as Propagators of Foot and Mouth Disease in which he links locusts soiled by saliva from infected cattle with the spread of Foot-and-mouth disease.

He is commemorated inter alia in Kannemeyeria simocephalus, Trephopoda kannemeyeri, Trematosaurus kannemeyeri, Dresserus kannemeyeri, Trirachodon kannemeyeri and Gomphognathus kannemeyeri.
