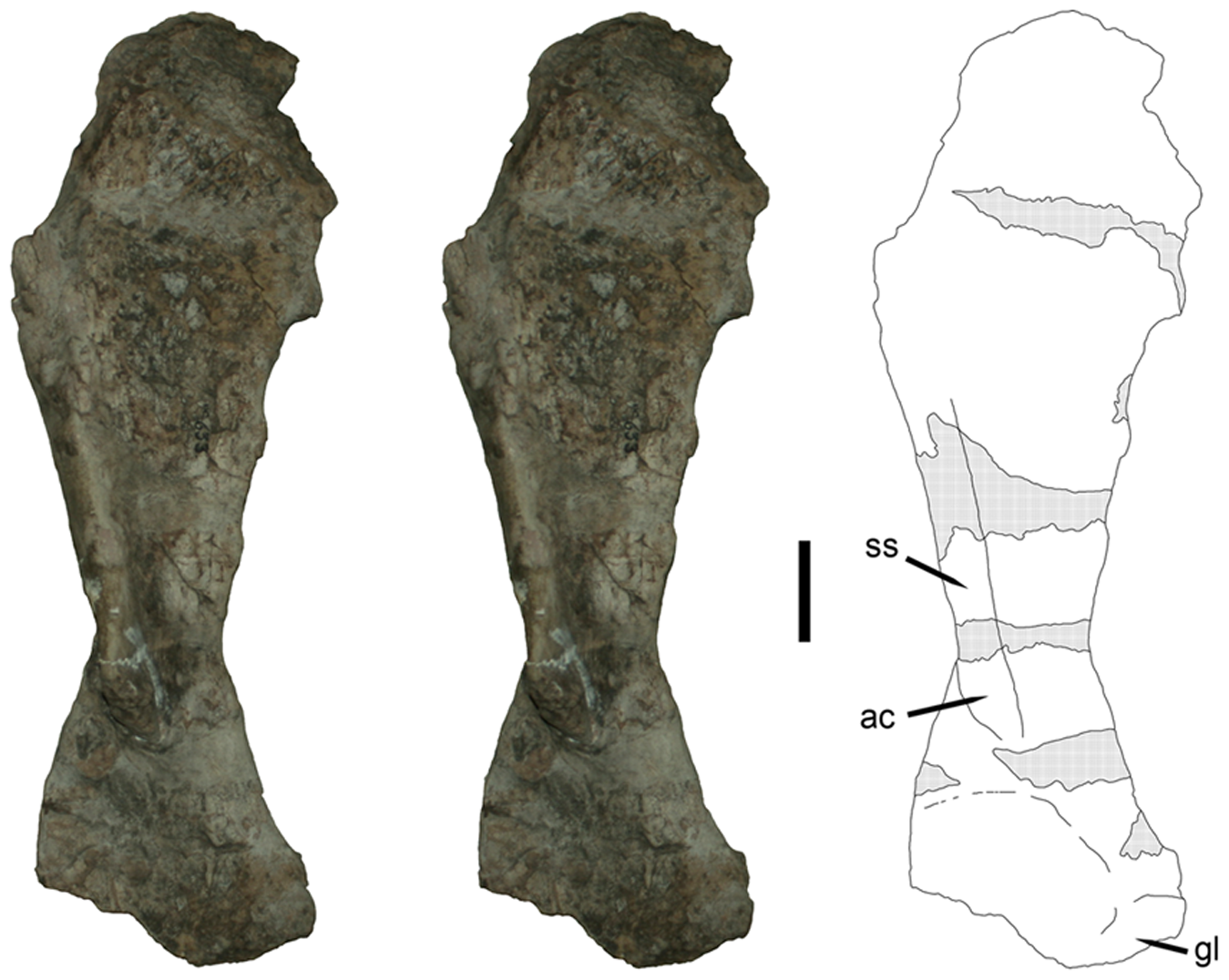
- Stereopair and interpretive drawing of the left scapula from the holotype

Scientific classification
- Kingdom: Animalia
- Phylum: Chordata
- Clade: Synapsida
- Clade: Therapsida
- Clade: †Anomodontia
- Clade: †Dicynodontia
- Family: †Stahleckeriidae
- Subfamily: †Stahleckeriinae
- Genus: †Eubrachiosaurus; Williston 1904

Type species
- †Eubrachiosaurus browni Williston 1904

Synonyms
- ?Brachybrachium Williston 1904

= Eubrachiosaurus =

Eubrachiosaurus Temporal range: Carnian-Norian ~235.0–221.5 Ma

Extinct genus of dicynodonts

Eubrachiosaurus is an extinct genus of stahleckeriid dicynodont known from the Late Triassic (Carnian stage) of Wyoming, United States.

== Description ==
Eubrachiosaurus is known only from the holotype specimen FMNH UC 633, a partial left scapula as well as a left humerus, and left pelvis which have been lost. It was collected at the Little Popo Agie River, near Lander, Fremont County from the Popo Agie Formation of the Chugwater Group. Eubrachiosaurus browni was first described and named by Samuel Wendell Williston in 1904 along with Brachybrachium brevipes. Lucas and Hunt (1993) considered both taxa junior synonyms of Placerias hesternus, which is known from the same formation, a position maintained in most subsequent studies. The synonymy of Eubrachiosaurus and Placerias was questioned by Long and Murry (1995) who noted that the ectepicondyle of Eubrachiosaurus was enlarged as in Ischigualastia. All of Williston's dicynodont material from Popo Agie has been lost, apart from the partial left scapula of Eubrachiosaurus. Kammerer et al. (2013) redescribed the available material and the missing elements were redescribed from photographs taken by Williston (1904), and suggested that Eubrachiosaurus is a valid member of the Stahleckeriinae, most closely related to Sangusaurus.

Kammerer et al. (2013) also noted that Williston (1904) described Brachybrachium on the basis of a fragmentary humerus from the upper Popo Agie beds, in "almost identically the same horizon" as Eubrachiosaurus. The currently lost specimen was poorly preserved with much of the proximal and distal ends missing. It shares with the humerus of Eubrachiosaurus a nearly perpendicular angle between the edges of the deltopectoral crest. Furthermore, the traits on which basis Williston used to distinguish the two taxa are either known to vary intraspecifically in kannemeyeriiforms or were too badly preserved in Brachybrachium to display clear morphological differences from Eubrachiosaurus. Thus, Kammerer et al. (2013) concluded the it is probable that these two taxa are synonymous, but noted that on a strict apomorphy basis Brachybrachium brevipes must be considered a nomen dubium.
