= Zambiasaurus =

Zambiasaurus Temporal range: Middle Triassic

Scientific classification
- Kingdom: Animalia
- Phylum: Chordata
- Clade: Synapsida
- Clade: Therapsida
- Clade: †Anomodontia
- Clade: †Dicynodontia
- Family: †Stahleckeriidae
- Subfamily: †Placeriinae
- Genus: †Zambiasaurus; Cox, 1969
- Species: †Z. submersus

Binomial name
- †Zambiasaurus submersus Cox, 1969

Extinct genus of dicynodonts

Zambiasaurus is an extinct genus of dicynodonts that was discovered in the Middle Triassic (Anisian) Ntawere Formation of Zambia, southern Africa. It was a large dicynodont, reconstructed using several fossil fragments, in majority belonging to probably a juvenile Zambiasaurus submersus.

Zambiasaurus submersus is the type species of the genus Zambiasaurus. It is a stahleckeriid, the first stahleckeriid known outside South America, and it is also the oldest known stahleckeriid.

== Description ==
=== Skull ===
The skull of Zambiasaurus submersus was reconstructed by using eighteen different juvenile fossil fragments and fragments of an adult Zambiasaurus. The immature skull had the dimensions of 23 centimetres (9.1 in) long and 21 centimetres (8.3 in) wide while the adults had a skull 45 centimetres (18 in) long and 40 centimetres (16 in) wide. There are no teeth in both upper and lower jaws making it a herbivorous species. Skull tapers anteriorly, widest across occiput. Wide inter-orbital region and narrow inter-temporal region. A blunt snout and a short median suture between nasals. Pineal foramen surrounded by parietals. Preparietal bone absent. Parietals slightly concave antero-posteriorly and from bulk of intertemporal bar. Interparietal bone doesn't extend far forward. No sharp median intertemporal ridge. Sharp transition between dorsal and occipital surface. Occipital wings of squamosal extend laterally and somewhat posteriorly. Palatal surface of premaxilla bears pair of anterior ridges.

=== Post-cranial elements ===
Fragmented vertebrae showed the prezygapophyses is concave and the postzygapophyses is convex. Fragments of ribs did not provide any useful information. Reconstructed from a lower and upper fragment, the scapula showed a long and narrow blade, low scapular spine running along the antero-lateral edge. Acromion process is not very large. Origin of scapular ligament of triceps muscle on postero-dorsal edge above the glenoid. There is no notch on the lower edge of the scapula so the foramen laid entirely inside the precoracoid. Fragments of clavicle provided no useful information.

Sternum is hexagonal and ventral side is slightly concave. Dorsal side has postero-lateral bosses that have cartilage-ornaments on the ends. Reconstructed from two complementary fragments, the humerus is strongly twisted expressing very poorly muscular insertion and articulation areas. The radius is also incomplete and reconstructed from two distal fragments. It is slender and configured to be longer than the ulna. A complete ulna shows a slender bone and convex distal ends.

== Classification ==
Zambiasaurus is characterized as a stahleckeriid, because of many shared characteristics such as;

- Blunt snout
- Wide but low occiput
- Short temporal opening
- Lack of a high intertemporal crest
- absence of preparietal
- Nasals meet for a short distance in the midline or separated by a junction
- Narrow neural spine similar to anterior vertebrae of juvenile Stahleckeria
- Coracoid, Sternum, and Pelvis generally similar
- Absence of tusks signify a close relation to Stahleckeria rather than Dinodontosaurus or Chanaria, the other two Stakleckeriid genera

== History ==
Zambiasaurus was named after the country of origin Zambia and Zambiasaurus submersus means the likelihood that the species drowned.

Fossil reptiles were first found in upper Luangwa River valley by Dixey in 1928 and 1935. The area was later re-examined in 1960 and 1960 by Dr. A. R. Drysdall and James Kitching. They examined an area north-west of Sitwe for four months and collected almost 500 specimens. Later an expedition to Sitwe was done by a joint effort of the British Museum (Natural History) and University of London. They spent six weeks collecting 220 specimens. Even though there was a large collection of specimens the specimens themselves were imperfect or poorly documented.

== Paleobiology ==
Thought to be herbivorous because of the lack of teeth and movement of lower jaws that appeared to be efficient in mastication. Zambiasaurus had a barrel shaped body that was strongly built but very slow. The body was held off the ground but it either had a sprawling stance or a more upright stance.

== See also ==
- List of therapsids
- Dicynodont
- Stahleckeriids
