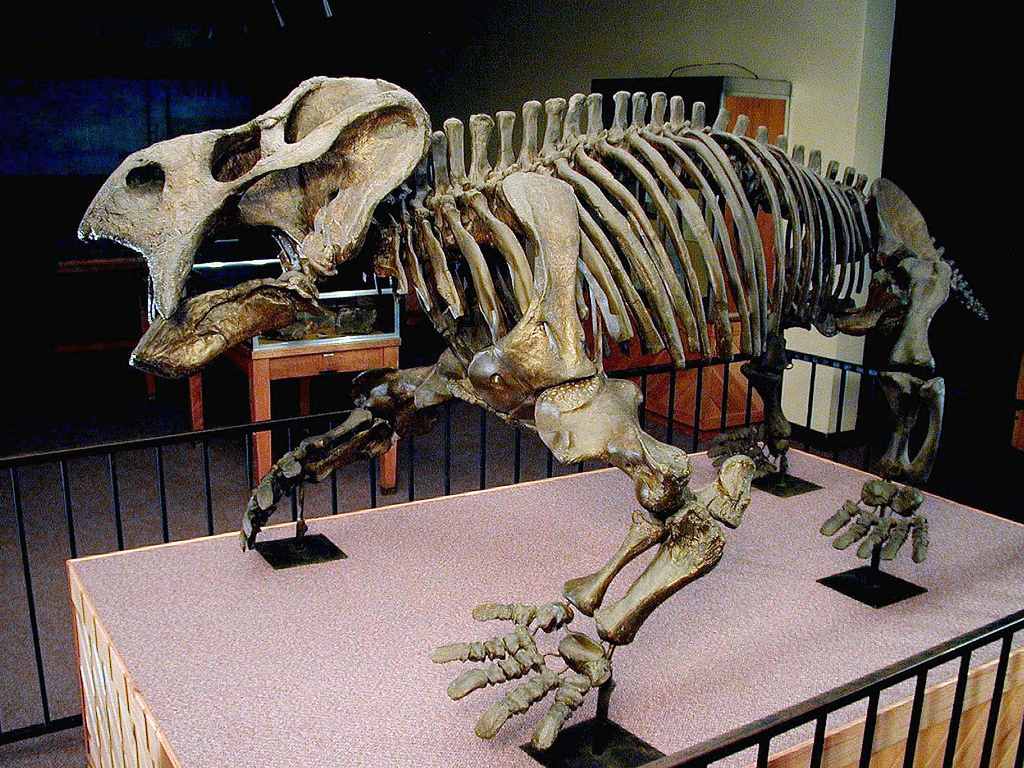
- Skeleton

Scientific classification
- Kingdom: Animalia
- Phylum: Chordata
- Clade: Synapsida
- Clade: Therapsida
- Clade: †Anomodontia
- Clade: †Dicynodontia
- Family: †Stahleckeriidae
- Subfamily: †Placeriinae
- Genus: †Placerias; Lucas, 1904
- Species: †P. hesternus

Binomial name
- †Placerias hesternus Lucas, 1904

= Placerias =

Placerias Temporal range: Late Carnian to Norian ~230–215 Ma

Extinct genus of dicynodonts

Placerias (meaning 'broad body') is an extinct genus of dicynodonts that lived during the Carnian and Norian stages of the Triassic period (230–215 million years ago). Placerias belongs to a clade of dicynodonts called Kannemeyeriiformes, which was the last known group of dicynodonts before the taxon became extinct at the end of the Triassic.

== Description ==
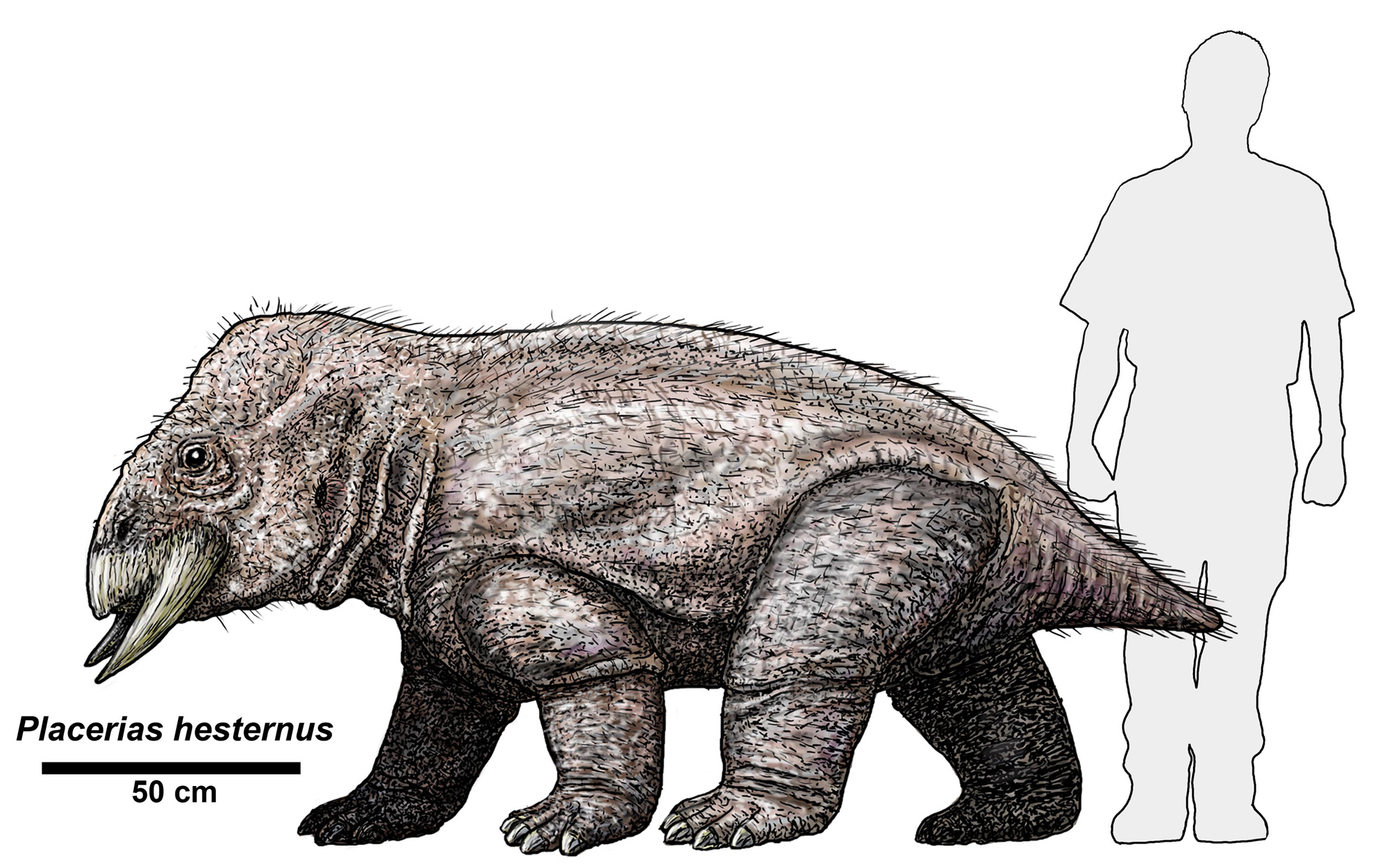
P. hesternus compared to a human

Placerias was one of the largest herbivores in the Late Triassic, weighing up to 800–1,000 kilograms (1,800–2,200 lb). The largest skull found had a length of 68 centimetres (26.8 in).

Placerias had a powerful neck, strong legs, and barrel-shaped body with possible ecological and evolutionary parallels with the modern hippopotamus, spending much of its time during the wet season wallowing in the water and chewing at bankside vegetation. Placerias was closely related to Ischigualastia and similar in appearance.

Placerias used its beak to slice through thick branches and roots with two tusk-like flanges that could be used for defence and for intra-specific display. These so-called caniniforms were not true tusks derived from teeth, like in other dicynodonts, but were instead extensions of the skull merely mimicking tusks, likely covered in horn or beak tissue, a trait unique to the Stahleckeriidae family. The genus exhibits two morphs, one with short caniniforms and one with long caniniforms. This condition is inferred to be sexual dimorphism, with the longer-tusked individuals presumably being males.

== Discovery ==
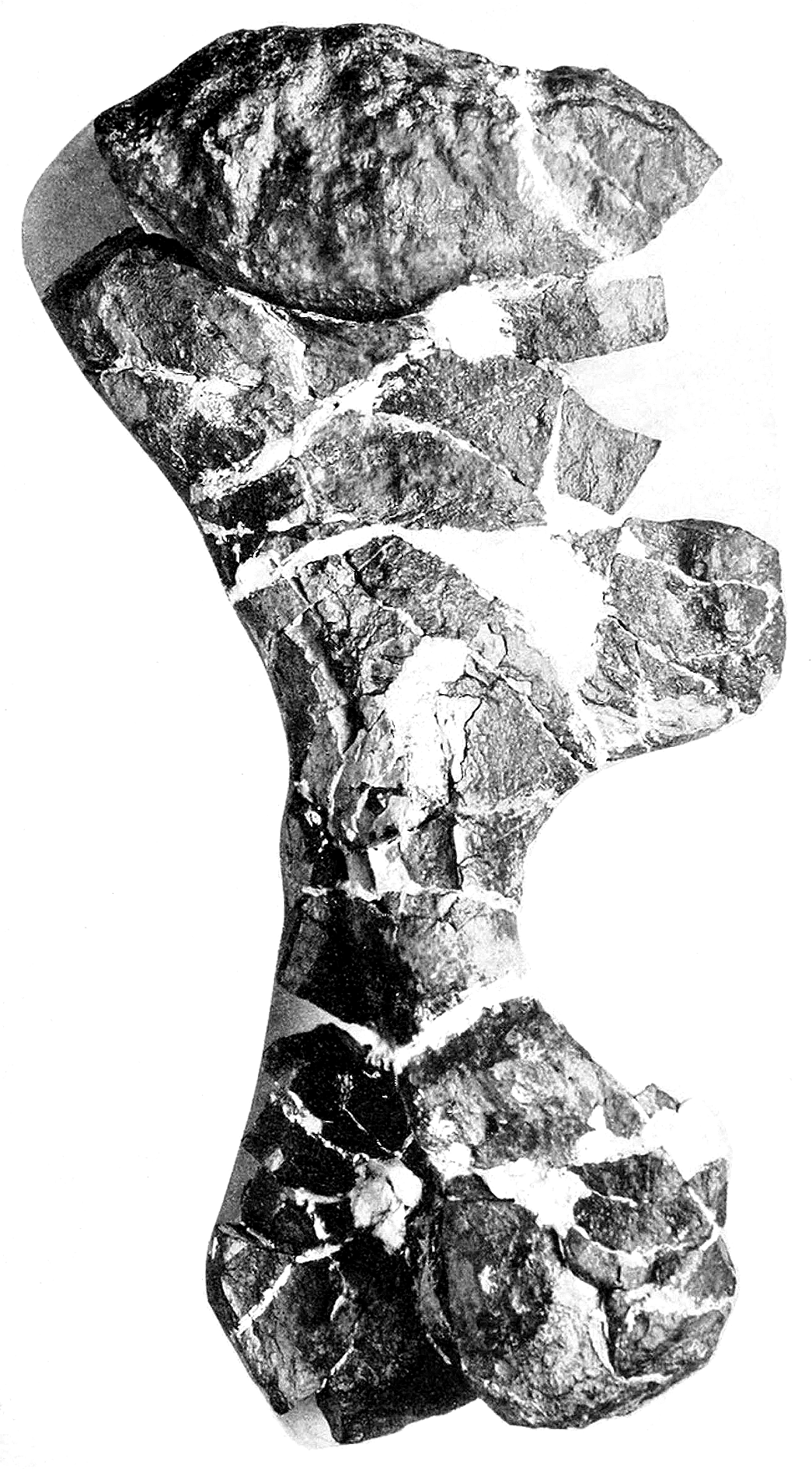
The original (holotype) Placerias humerus

The first Placerias fossil to be collected was a humerus (upper arm bone) found by Barnum Brown in 1900, near Cameron, Arizona. The only decently preserved Placerias skull, MNA V8464, was found in the same general area in 1991. Fragmentary Placerias fossils are also known from New Mexico and the Pekin Formation of North Carolina.

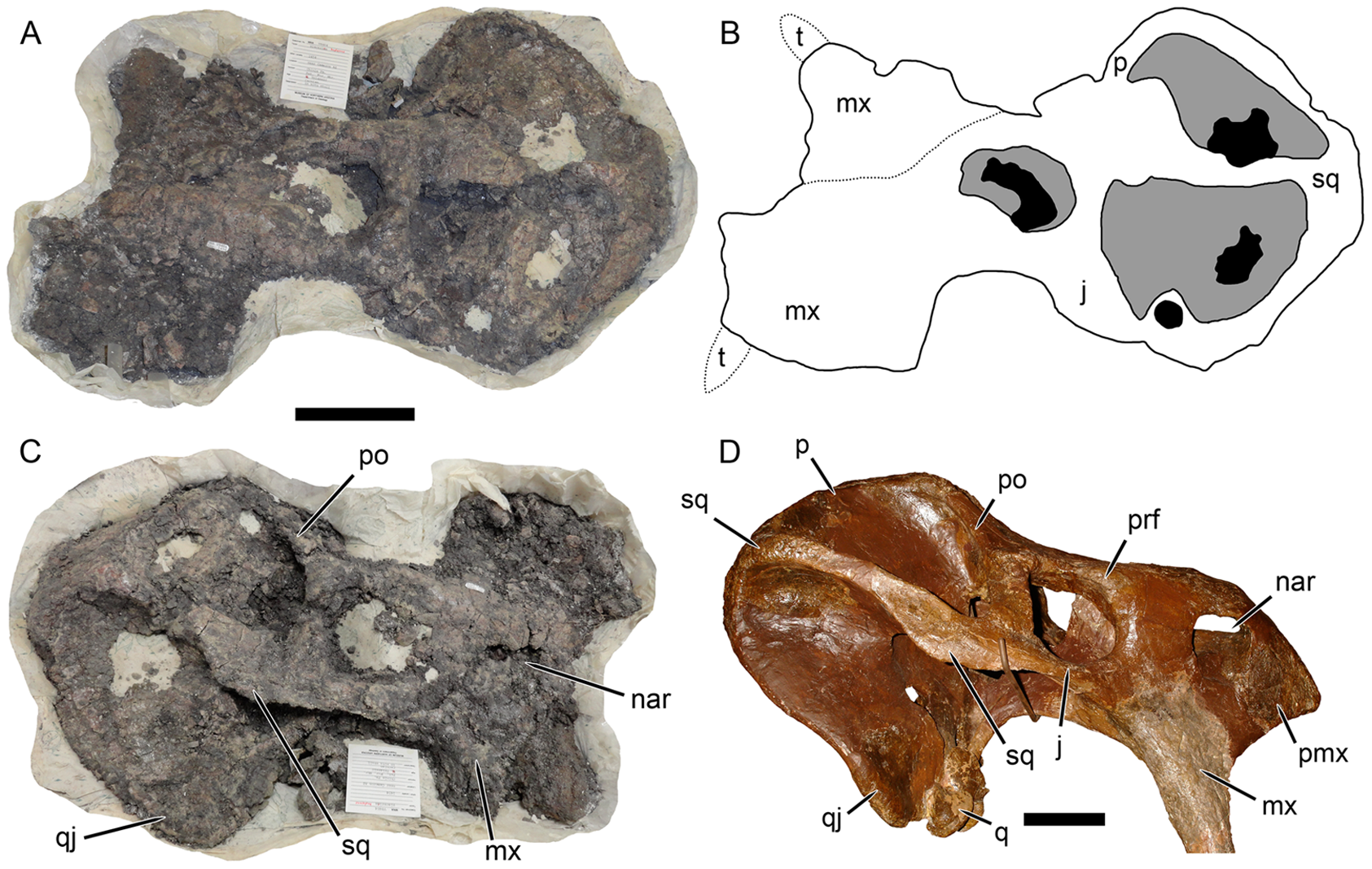
MNA V8464, the most complete known skull of Placerias. Original upside-down misinterpretation (A, B), right-side-up revision (C), and a comparison to an older skull model (D), designed in the 1950s based on isolated fossils from the Placerias Quarry.

Placerias is a rare component of North American Triassic faunas, though one site is a major exception to this rule. In 1930, Charles Camp and Samuel Welles (of the University of California, Berkeley) discovered an enormous concentration of Placerias fossils near St. Johns, southeast of the Petrified Forest in the Chinle Formation of Arizona. This site has since become known as the 'Placerias Quarry'. Over 1600 Placerias bones are known from this one location, representing about 41 individuals. Despite this abundance, none of the fossils are articulated (i.e., no bones are connected to each other), which poses a challenge for reconstructing the animal's exact proportions. Sedimentological features of the site indicate a low-energy depositional environment, possibly flood-plain or overbank. Bones are associated mostly with mudstones and a layer that contains numerous carbonate nodules. Placerias was originally considered the last of the dicynodonts, although other Late Triassic dicynodonts, such as Lisowicia and Pentasaurus have since been discovered. (Note: A report of a dicynodont fossil from the Cretaceous Period proved to be neither Cretaceous nor a dicynodont; it proved to be a specimen of a diprotodontid marsupial that probably dates to the Pliocene or Pleistocene.)

== Palaeobiology ==
=== Growth ===
P. hesternus outer cortical primary bone is generally zonal fibrolamellar in orientation, with a parallel-fibred peripheral layer. This suggests that P. hesternus experienced rapid osteogenesis punctuated by intervals of slower growth. Also, an external fundamental system has been described from a very large P. hesternus tibia, suggesting that this feature developed following the attainment of maximum size and cessation of growth.

== See also ==
- List of therapsids
- Ischigualastia
