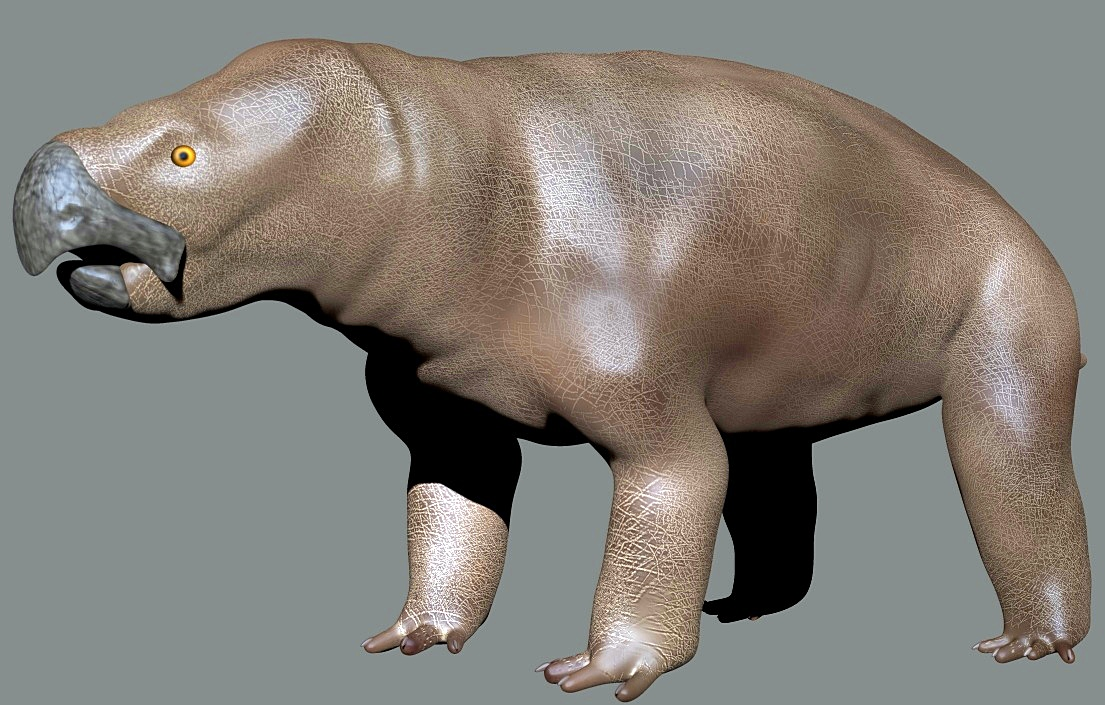
- 3D restoration of J. candelariensis

Scientific classification
- Domain: Eukaryota
- Kingdom: Animalia
- Phylum: Chordata
- Clade: Synapsida
- Clade: Therapsida
- Suborder: †Anomodontia
- Clade: †Dicynodontia
- Family: †Stahleckeriidae
- Subfamily: †Stahleckeriinae
- Genus: †Jachaleria; Bonaparte 1971

Type species
- Jachaleria colorata Bonaparte 1971

Species
- J. candelariensis Araujo & Gonzaga 1980; J. colorata Bonaparte 1971

Synonyms
- Jacheleria [sic]

= Jachaleria =

Jachaleria Temporal range: Ladinian-Norian ~240–220 Ma

Extinct genus of dicynodonts

Jachaleria was a dicynodont herbivore that lived from the Ladinian to Norian stages of the Middle to Late Triassic, from approximately 240 to 220 million years ago. Jachaleria was one of the last representatives of the dicynodonts, occurring in Argentina and Brazil. It lacked teeth, much like Stahleckeria, but was closer in size to Dinodontosaurus.

== Species ==
- Jachaleria candelariensis is found near Candelária City, in the Paraná Basin of southeastern Brazil. It grew to perhaps 3 metres (9.8 ft) in length and had an estimated body mass of 300 kilograms (660 lb). Throughout the early part of the Upper Triassic dicynodonts were absent from the paleorrota and the rhynchosaurs were the dominant herbivores. At the end of Carnian, however, the rhynchosaurs became extinct and the dicynodonts appear in their place. Jachaleria candelariensis occurs in the Caturrita Formation.
- Jachaleria colorata is found in Argentina, in the Chañares, Ischigualasto and Los Colorados Formations of the Ischigualasto-Villa Unión Basin in northwestern Argentina. It is very similar to Jachaleria candelariensis. It is one of the two dicynodont species that coexisted with large sauropodomorphs (the other one being Pentasaurus).

== See also ==
- List of therapsids
