= Sangusaurus =

Sangusaurus Temporal range: Anisian ~247–242 Ma

Scientific classification
- Domain: Eukaryota
- Kingdom: Animalia
- Phylum: Chordata
- Clade: Synapsida
- Clade: Therapsida
- Suborder: †Anomodontia
- Clade: †Dicynodontia
- Family: †Stahleckeriidae
- Subfamily: †Stahleckeriinae
- Genus: †Sangusaurus; Cox 1969

Type species
- †Sangusaurus edentatus Cox, 1969

Species
- †S. edentatus Cox 1969 (type); †S. parringtonii Cruickshank 1986

Extinct genus of dicynodonts

Sangusaurus is an extinct genus of large dicynodont synapsid with two recognized species: S. edentatus (the type species) and S. parringtonii. Sangusaurus is named after the Sangu stream in eastern Zambia near to where it was first discovered + ‘saur’ which is the Greek root for lizard. Sangusaurus fossils have been recovered from the upper parts of the Ntawere Formation in Zambia and of the Lifua Member of the Manda Beds in Tanzania. The earliest study considered Sangusaurus a kannemeyeriid dicynodont, but more recent phylogenetic analyses place Sangusaurus within the stahleckeriid clade of Dicynodontia. Until recently, little work had been done to describe Sangusaurus, likely because only four incomplete fossil specimens have been discovered.

== Discovery ==
The first Sangusaurus fossil was found in 1963 during a joint paleontological expedition of the British Museum (Natural History) and the University of London. Cox first named and described S. edentatus in 1969. A second species was discovered in the Manda Beds of the Ruhuhu Basin, Tanzania and named S. parringtonii in 1986; it was, however, not described in detail until much later. Sangusaurus parringtonii was determined to be a new species based on differences in the caniniform processes. The fossil record for Sangusaurus is poor, with only four fragmentary specimens (1 of S. edentatus, 3 of S. paringtonii) recovered to date. Since its original discovery in the 1960s, no further S. edentatus remains have been found.

== Geology ==
=== Ntawere Formation ===
The Ntawere Formation is a fluviolacustrine sedimentary deposit in Zambia which ranges from mudstone to very coarse, conglomeratic sandstones. The formation is “composed of alternating dark red fissile mudstones with laminar calcrete horizons and light red massive siltstones interbedded with lenticular siliceous sandstones”. Fluvial features such as channel-form strata, trough cross-bedding, and alternating deposits of low energy mudstones with higher energy sandstones all point to episodic flooding in the region. The presence of slickenplanes and carbonate nodules in the deposit are indicative of a highly seasonal distribution of rainfall and/or fluctuating water table height. Additionally, the presence of fish and non-marine bivalve fossils support a seasonal pond environment. The lithology and sedimentary structures indicate the paleoenvironment was a semiarid floodplain which accumulated semi-permanent seasonal ponds.

=== Manda Beds ===
The Manda Beds of Tanzania are similar to the Ntawere Formation in that they were deposited in warm, semiarid environmental conditions. Desiccation cracks and pedogenic calcretes provide the evidence for this paleoenvironmental interpretation. The beds are composed of fluvial quartzarenites with cyclical, upward-fining sequences indicative of a meandering stream system. The stratigraphic sequence suggests a changing climate from warm and humid conditions to hotter, more arid conditions in the upper Lower Triassic. The presence of crevasse splay sandstones with fossil accumulations combined with accumulations of disarticulated dicynodont fossil bones located downstream suggests the crevasse may have been a physical trap, particularly for large dicynodonts such as Sangusaurus.

The genus Sangusaurus became biostratigraphically important as a link between the Ntawere Formation and the Manda Beds Formation.

== Description ==
=== Unique features ===
Upon its discovery, Cox determined that the most significant feature of Sangusaurus was its posterodorsally directed intertemporal bar. Differences setting Sangusaurus apart include the presence of a low boss behind the pineal foramen and the posterodorsally directed intertemporal bar, which is narrower than in other stahleckeriids. Based on the fragments recovered, Cox suggested the skull would have been 35–40 cm long. Other features diagnosing Sangusaurus are its anteriorly taping maxilla and palatal ridges that meet at the lateral rather than anterior edge of the bone.

Sangusaurus and other stahleckeriids have distinctive femora due to the medially offset discrete femoral head. In all stahleckeriids for which femoral material has been recovered, including Sangusaurus, the head is distinctly separate from the dorsal edge of the greater trochanter. The head of the femur is larger and nearly spherical compared to the more ovoid, reduced size in other kannemeyeriiforms.

=== Feeding system ===
As a member of Dicynodontia, Sangusaurus was an herbivore. It has been noted that the dicynodont masticatory system showed a range of variations on the general dicynodont theme. Kenneth D. Angielczyk, P. John Hancox & Ali Nabavizadeh (2018) provided the first in-depth study of the masticatory system of Sangusaurus. The system emphasizes an orthal jaw motion in which “[t]he articular surfaces of the jaw joint form a single posteroventrally sloping surface; translating the quadrate and the articular results in a primarily orthal movement of the jaw symphysis."

Other features of its feeding system include internal and external jaw adductors that would have provided a dorsally-directed component to the power stroke and a stronger transverse component of jaw movement. This is due to the far lateral location of M. adductor mandibulae externus lateralis. In sum, the feeding system of Sangusaurus consisted “of a primarily orthal power stroke of the oral cavity, with slight palinal motion in tandem, followed by transverse motion of the dentary aided by a lateral pulling vector of the dorsolaterally oriented mAMEL [M. adductor mandibulae externus lateralis].” The authors concluded that Sangusaurus may have developed a novel means to exploit altered vegetation after the end-Permian mass extinction.

== See also ==
- List of therapsids
