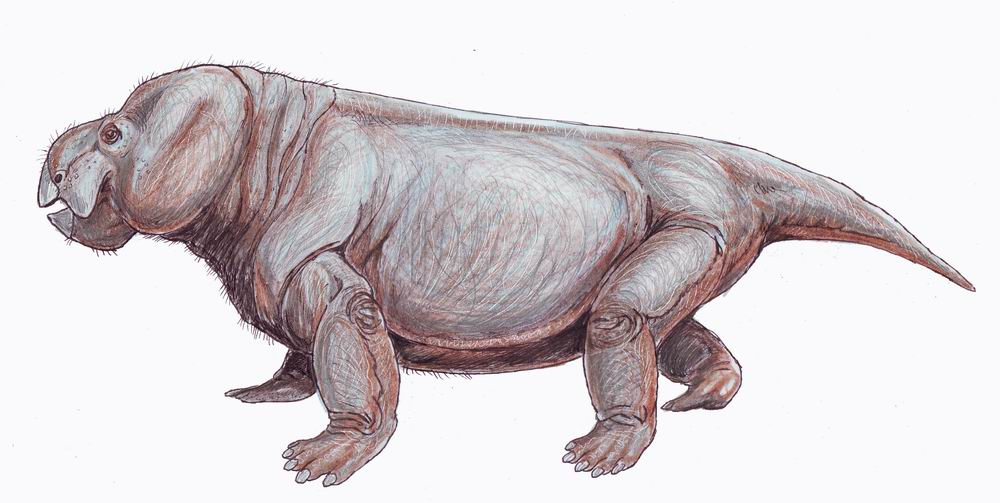
- Stahleckeria potens

Scientific classification
- Kingdom: Animalia
- Phylum: Chordata
- Clade: Synapsida
- Clade: Therapsida
- Clade: †Anomodontia
- Clade: †Dicynodontia
- Family: †Stahleckeriidae
- Subfamily: †Stahleckeriinae
- Genus: †Stahleckeria von Huene, 1935
- Species: †S. potens

Binomial name
- †Stahleckeria potens von Huene, 1935

= Stahleckeria =

Stahleckeria Temporal range: Mid Triassic ~237 Ma

Extinct genus of dicynodonts

Stahleckeria is an extinct genus of Middle Triassic (Ladinian) dicynodonts. It lived about 237 million years ago in what is now Brazil and Namibia. As a member of the group Kannemeyeriiformes, it was similar to the genus Kannemeyeria. The genus is known from the type species Stahleckeria potens, which was first collected from the Ladinian-age Santa Maria Formation in the Paleorrota fossil site of Brazil. Stahleckeria was named in honor of Rudolf Stahlecker, who discovered the first specimens during a 1935 expedition led by paleontologist Friedrich von Huene to the Chiniquá fossil site.

== Description ==
Size of Stahleckeria potens relative to a human

Paleogeography before the opening of the South Atlantic

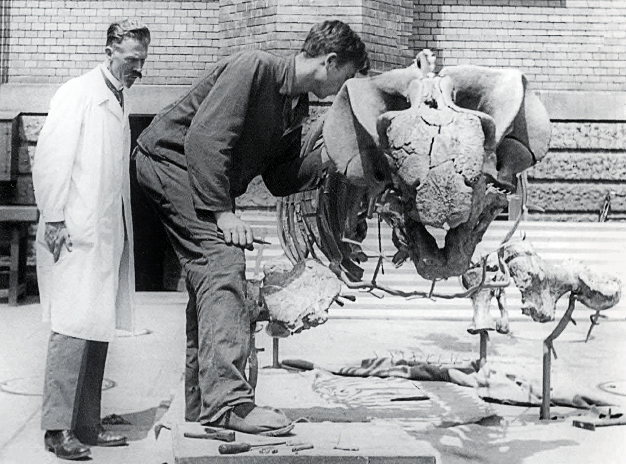
Friedrich von Huene (left) with a skeleton of Stahleckeria at University of Tübingen

Skull of Stahleckeria measured 60 centimetres (2 ft) in length. It was a contemporary of the more common Dinodontosaurus. The differences between Stahleckeria and Dinodontosaurus may reflect adaptations to feeding on different plant species.

In 2012, fossils of Stahleckeria potens were described from the Omingonde Formation in Namibia, which like the Santa Maria Formation is Ladinian in age. The Omingonde Formation is part of the Karoo Supergroup, which preserves many Triassic tetrapod fossils in southern Africa but notably lacks fossils in a hiatus called the "Ladinian gap". In addition to the remains of Stahleckeria potens, fossils of the cynodont Chiniquodon and an unidentified rauisuchian have also been found in the Omingonde deposits. The presence of these animals in South America and in Africa at the same time is strong evidence that the two continents were once one uninterrupted landmass with a uniform climate and habitat that land animals such as Stahleckeria could travel freely between.

The fossils of Stahleckeria potens discovered in Brazil are currently in Germany in the museum of the University of Tübingen.
