= Federal University of Santa Maria =

Academic publisher

Coordinates: 29.7134°S 53.7170°W

- Universidade Federal de Santa Maria
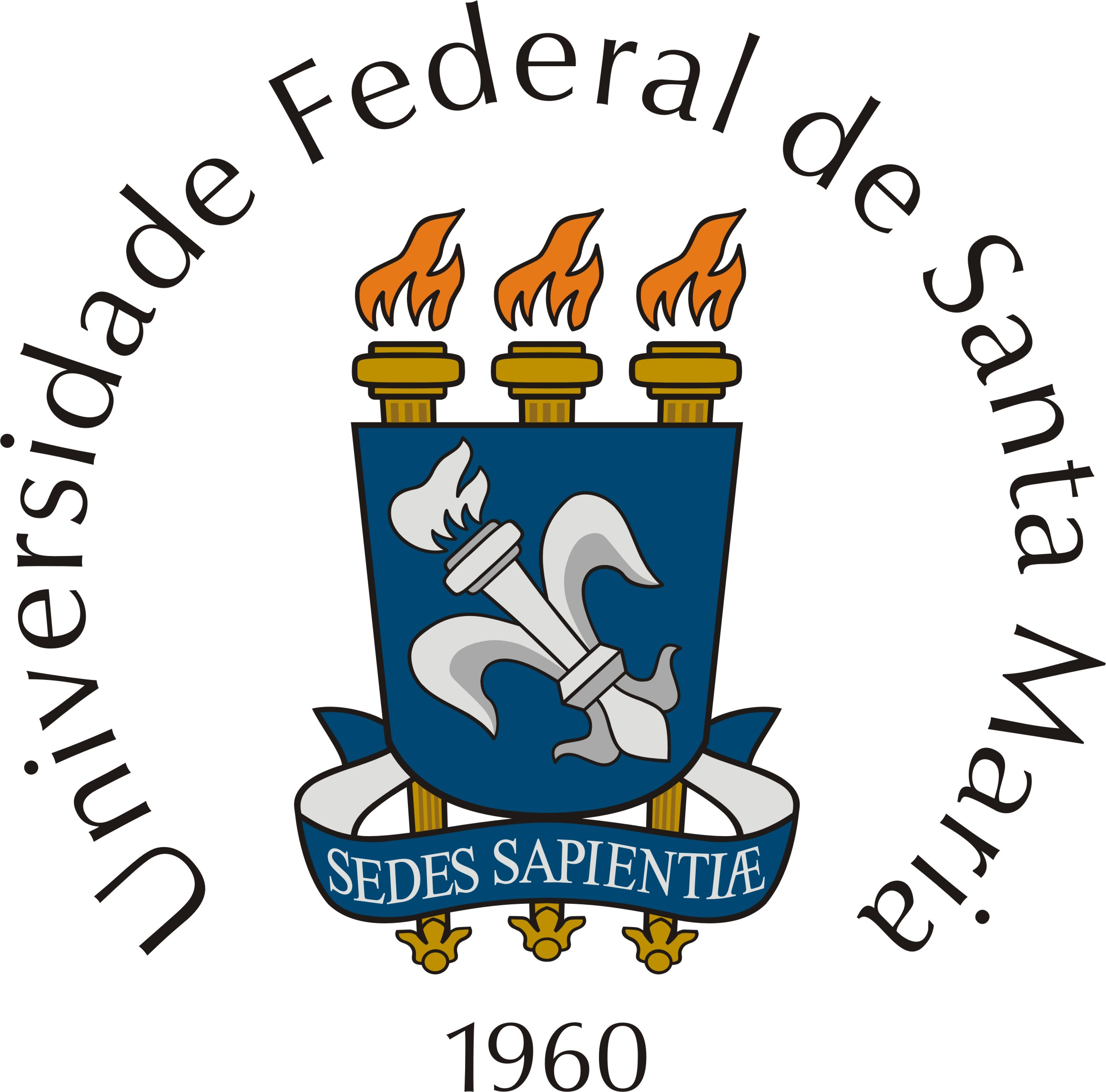
- Other names: UFSM
- Motto: Sedes Sapientiæ "Seat of Wisdom"
- Type: Public
- Established: 14 December 1960; 65 years ago
- Endowment: R$ 1.15 billion (2015)
- Rector: Prof. Luciano Schuch
- Academic staff: 1,847
- Administrative staff: 4,780
- Students: 28,307 (2016)
- Undergraduates: 20,834
- Postgraduates: 5,064
- Other students: 2,409
- Location: Santa Maria, RS, Brazil
- Campus: Santa Maria, RS Frederico Westphalen, RS Palmeira das Missões, RS Silveira Martins, RS
- Website: www.ufsm.br

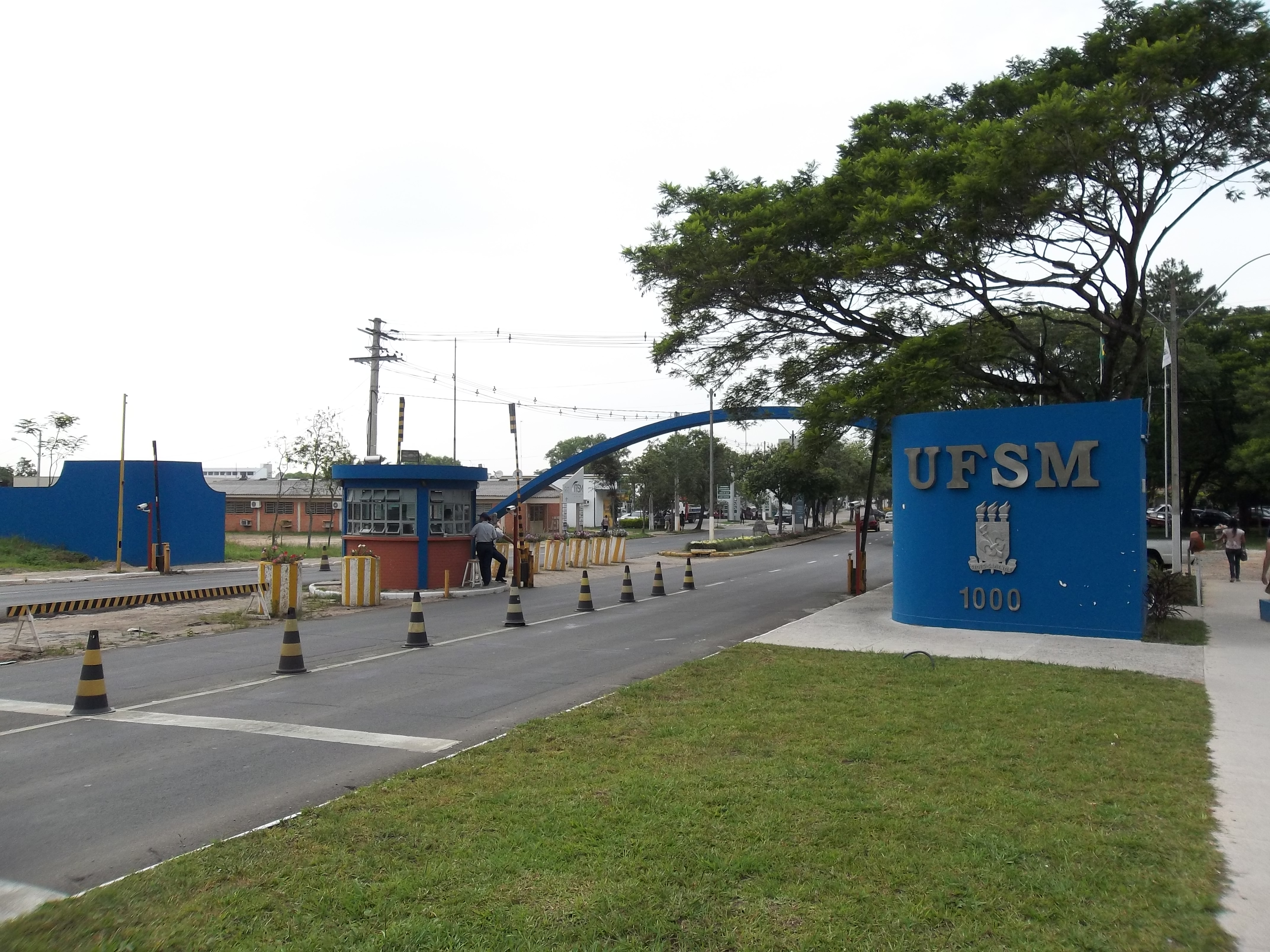
Entrance

The Federal University of Santa Maria (Portuguese: Universidade Federal de Santa Maria, UFSM) is a Brazilian public university located in Santa Maria, in the state of Rio Grande do Sul, funded by the federal government of Brazil. It was founded in 1960, by Professor José Mariano da Rocha Filho. Its campuses span over 1,837.72 ha, with a total of 386,968 m^{2} of buildings and 28,307 students.

UFSM's presence in the municipality of Santa Maria is one of the reasons why the city is sometimes called "university city" or "culture city". It is located in western Rio Grande do Sul, approximately 290 km far from the capital city of the state, Porto Alegre, thus being set in the heart of the pampas of Brazil.

As a public university, students do not pay tuition fees. It is the oldest federal university not located in a Brazilian state capital city, and the largest in number of undergraduate courses offered in Rio Grande do Sul state. As for 2015, the university was ranked at position 15 at national ranking from MEC.

== Admission ==
Like most other Brazilian higher education institutions, the admission for undergraduate courses in UFSM is mainly based on an annual open test called vestibular. The only request to be filled in order to apply for it is to have completed a high school course. UFSM's vestibular comprises a multiple-choice exam and a written essay and lasts for 3 mornings and 1 afternoon. The multiple-choice exam contains 15 questions on each of the following subjects: Portuguese Language, Brazilian Literature, Chemistry, Mathematics, Physics, Geography, History, Biology, Philosophy and Foreign Language (the applicant may choose one among English, Spanish, French, German and Italian). The written essay is usually an argumentative text on a theme.

UFSM offers also a serial admission program, called PEIES (or Programa de Ingresso ao Ensino Superior), which consists of a multiple-choice exam applied at the end of each of the three years of Brazilian high school, plus a written essay only in the third year. UFSM was the first university in Brazil to adopt such a program, through which 20% of all the undergraduate students are admitted. UFSM's vestibular and PEIES are both prepared and administered by Coperves (Permanent Commission for Vestibular).

In 2011, the most competitive course was Medicine, with over 96 candidates per opening. Since 2015, vestibular was replaced by "SISU", a national wide selection system for general university entrance, as it happens to most of federal universities on the country.

== Campuses ==
UFSM has four campuses: the main one in Camobi, Santa Maria; one campus in the municipality of Silveira Martins, near Santa Maria; and two smaller ones in northern Rio Grande do Sul, in the municipalities of Frederico Westphalen and Palmeira das Missões. In Santa Maria, however, the courses of Law, Business, Accounting, Psychology, Economics, International Relations, and Dentistry are still offered off-campus, in the city centre.

== Academic centres and courses offered ==
The university is divided into nine academic centers, which administer and organize the undergraduate and postgraduate courses offered.

- Centro de Artes e Letras (CAL) — Centre of Arts and Languages

Undergraduate courses offered at the Campus of Santa Maria:
Theater (Acting and Directing), Visual Arts (Drawing and Sculpture), Industrial Design, Languages and Literatures (Portuguese; English; Spanish), and Music (Licentiate; specific musical instrument; Singing).

- Centro de Ciências Naturais e Exatas (CCNE) — Centre of Natural and Exact Sciences

Undergraduate courses offered at the Campus of Santa Maria:
Biology, Physics, Geography, Meteorology, Mathematics, Chemistry, Industrial Chemistry, and Statistics.

- Centro de Ciências Rurais (CCR) — Centre of Rural Sciences

Undergraduate courses offered at the Campus of Santa Maria:
Agronomy, Forestry, Veterinary Medicine, Animal Husbandry, and Technology on Food.

- Centro de Ciências da Saúde (CCS) — Centre of Health Sciences

Undergraduate courses offered at the Campus of Santa Maria:
Nursing, Pharmacy and Biochemistry, Physiotherapy, Speech and Language Therapy, Occupational Therapy, Medicine, and Dentistry (some classes offered in downtown Santa Maria).

- Centro de Ciências Sociais e Humanas (CCSH) — Centre of Social and Human Sciences

Undergraduate courses offered at the Campus of Santa Maria:
Archival science, Sociology, Communications (Journalism; Public Relations; Advertising and Publishing), Philosophy, and History.

Undergraduate courses offered at downtown Santa Maria:
Business Administration, Accountancy, Economics, Law, Psychology, and International Relations.

- Centro de Educação (CE) — Centre of Education

Undergraduate courses offered at the Campus of Santa Maria:
Pedagogy, and Special Education.

- Centro de Educação Física e Desporto (CEFD) — Centre of Physical Education and Sports

Undergraduate course offered at the Campus of Santa Maria:
Physical Education.

- Centro de Tecnologia (CT) — Centre of Technology

Undergraduate courses offered at the Campus of Santa Maria:
Architecture and Urban Planning, Computer Science, Computer Engineering, Acoustical Engineering, Aerospace Engineering, Civil Engineering, Control Engineering, Electrical Engineering, Mechanical Engineering, Production Engineering, Chemical Engineering, Sanitary and Environmental Engineering, and Information Systems.

Graduate courses offered at the Campus of Santa Maria:
Computer Science, Civil Engineering, Process Engineering, Electrical Engineering, Production Engineering.

- Centro de Educação Superior Norte-RS (CESNORS) — Centre of Higher Education of Northern Rio Grande do Sul

Undergraduate courses offered at the Campus of Frederico Westphalen:
Agronomy, Communications (Journalism; Public Relations with emphasis on Multimedia), Environmental Engineering, Forestry, Technology on Food, and Technology on Internet Systems.

Undergraduate courses offered at the Campus of Palmeira das Missões:
Animal Husbandry, Biology, Business Administration, Nursing, and Nutrition.

- In addition:
  - the Coordenadoria de Ensino Médio e Tecnológico (CEMTEC) — Coordination of Secondary and Technical Education offers 4 other undergraduation courses at the Campus of Santa Maria:
    Technology on Cooperative Management, Technology on Geoprocessing, Technology on Mechanical Fabrication, and Technology on Computer Network;
  - the Unidade Descentralizada de Ensino Superior de Silveira Martins (UDESSM) — Descentralized Unit of Higher Education of Silveira Martins offers 4 undergraduate courses at the Campus of Silveira Martins:
    Technology on Agribusiness, Technology on Environmental Management, Technology on Tourism Management, and Technology on Management Process.

UFSM offers 11 distance education courses and 66 graduate courses.

== Secondary and technological education ==
The Federal University of Santa Maria also has three technical and secondary education institutions:

- The Colégio Técnico Industrial de Santa Maria (Industrial Technical School of Santa Maria);
- The Colégio Politécnico da UFSM (UFSM's Polytechnic School), also in Santa Maria; and
- The Colégio Agrícola de Frederico Westphalen (Agricultural School of Frederico Westphalen).

They are administered by UFSM's Coordenadoria de Ensino Médio e Tecnológico — Coordination of Secondary and Technical Education. The schools offer the plain high school syllabus, plus optional vocational education.

== Paleontology ==
UFSM is a center for studies of paleontology, since the city of Santa Maria sits on a deposit of fossils. It is considered an important institution of Paleorrota.

=== Paleontological Sites ===
- Paleontological Site Arroio Cancela.
- Paleontological Site Largo Padre Daniel Cargnin.
- Paleontological Site Bela Vista.
- Paleontological Site Jazigo Cinco.
- Paleontological Site Sanga da Alemoa.

== See also ==
- List of federal universities of Brazil
- Education in Brazil
- Paleorrota
- Brazil University Rankings
- Universities and Higher Education in Brazil
