= João Guilherme Fischer =

Brazilian diplomat and scientist (1876–1952)

- Born: September 9, 1876; Santa Maria, Rio Grande do Sul
- Died: 2 February 1952 (aged 75); Rio de Janeiro

João Guilherme Fischer, also known as Jango Fischer (9 September 1876 – 2 February 1952) was a Brazilian diplomat and scientist.

== Biography ==
Jango Fischer was born in Santa Maria in Rio Grande do Sul and died on February 2, 1952, in Rio de Janeiro. He was the son of Guilherme Fischer and Christina Holzbach.

== Career ==
He studied agronomy at a school in Taquari, Rio Grande do Sul from 1894 to 1898. He then received a pharmacy degree from the Federal University of Rio de Janeiro. He did not follow either of these careers, but rather opted for a career in diplomacy.

He was vice consul in Cobija, Bolivia in 1909, served in the office of Baron of Rio Branco until 1911, in Paris from 1911 to 1934 and in the Foreign Ministry from 1934 to 1944.

In 1902, he collected fossils at the Sanga da Alemoa paleontological site which he sent to Hermann von Ihering, director of the Museu Paulista in São Paulo. Three vertebral bodies were nearly complete, a fragment of a vertebra, one finger and four phalanges and ungual phalanx alone. The material was sent to Arthur Smith Woodward, the eminent paleontologist of the British Museum in London to study, which resulted in the determination of the first terrestrial reptile fossil in South America, the Rhynchosaur named by Woodward, with the name of Scaphonyx fischeri, in his honor. It officially started paleontological research in Paleorrota.
