= Gomphodontosuchus =

Gomphodontosuchus Temporal range: Late Triassic

Scientific classification
- Kingdom: Animalia
- Phylum: Chordata
- Clade: Synapsida
- Clade: Therapsida
- Clade: Cynodontia
- Family: †Traversodontidae
- Subfamily: †Gomphodontosuchinae
- Genus: †Gomphodontosuchus von Huene, 1928

Type species
- †Gomphodontosuchus brasiliensis von Huene, 1928

Extinct genus of cynodonts

Gomphodontosuchus is an extinct genus of cynodonts. It was created to describe the species Gomphodontosuchus brasiliensis.

== Species ==
Gomphodontosuchus brasiliensis was collected in 1927 and named in 1928 by Friedrich von Huene in the Natural Monument Sanga da Alemoa site in Santa Maria (Santa Maria Formation), Rio Grande do Sul, Brazil.
