= Daniel Cargnin =

Daniel Cargnin may refer to:

- Daniel Cargnin (paleontologist)
- Daniel Cargnin (judoka)
