= Guilherme Rau =

- Born: Germany
- Died: 1953
- Scientific career
- Fields: Botany, ophthalmologist and paleontologist.

Guilherme Rau (?–1953) immigrated to Santa Maria, Rio Grande do Sul, Brazil from Germany in 1900. An ophthalmologist, from 1915 to 1917 he helped with the Geological Survey of Berlin's excavation of 200 fossil at the Paleontological Site Sanga of Alemoa. He also contributed considerably to the Geopark of Paleorrota and taught Botany at the Faculty of Pharmacy of the city in the years 1934 and 1935.
