= Museum Vincente Pallotti =

Museum Vicente Pallotti
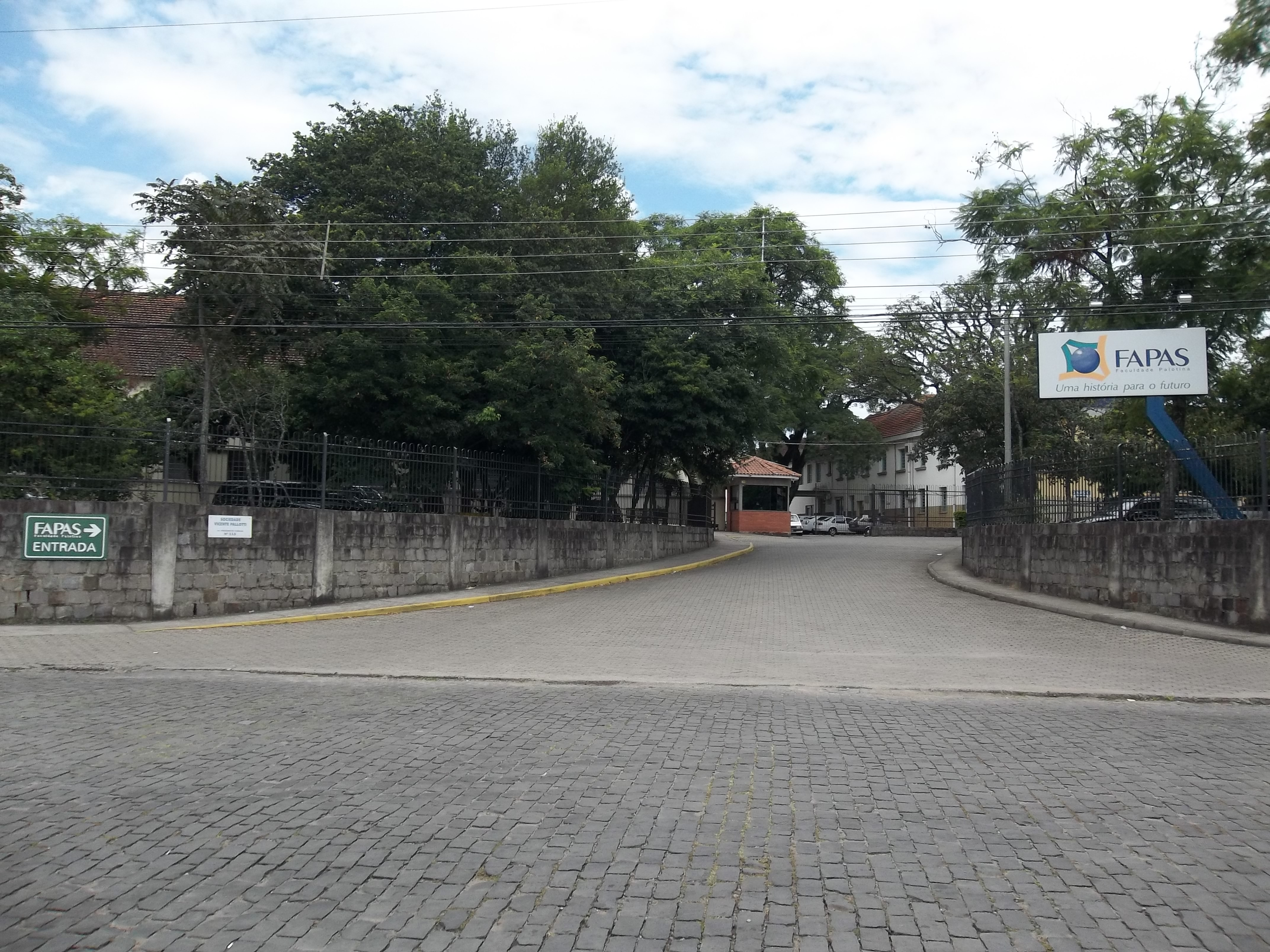
- Established: 1959
- Location: Avenida Presidente Vargas, 115. Santa Maria, Rio Grande do Sul, Brazil
- Coordinates: 29°42′09″S 53°49′39″W
- Type: Paleontology, Natural history museum
- Website: www.pallotti.com.br/museu

The Museum Vicente Pallotti is located on Avenida Presidente Vargas, 115 in Santa Maria, Rio Grande do Sul, Brazil. It is located in the same complex Palotina College (FAPAS). Visits need to be scheduled in advance.

== Rooms ==
The museum has many rooms, with great emphasis on the area of paleontology, with fossils of geopark of paleorrota.

- Mineralogy
- Zoology
- Hides and other
- Birds
- Snakes, insects and fish
- Paleontology
- War material
- Archeology

== History ==
In 1935, in the District of Vale-Vêneto, José Pivetta and Valentim Zamberlan started taxidermy in the museum, which is already part of the same collection.

In 1959, due to lack of space in Vale-Vêneto, the museum transferred to the College Máximo Palotino in Santa Maria. Moreover, in 1964, Daniel Cargnin, contributing to the museum in the college, collected various objects and fossils of geopark of paleorrota. On 7 January 1965, the museum received the first fossil, excavated in the Paleontological Site Sanga of Alemoa, near the town of Santa Maria. From this date, its growth continued, thanks especially to the efforts of Daniel Cargnin and Abraão Cargnin.

During the years 1972 to 1994, the museum personnel received several donations of the community in general and collections of sites: archaeological and palaeontological. During these years, the Museum Vicente Pallotti became a large repository of objects, and for this reason, the entire collection was in precarious conditions. Then in 1994, aiming to solve the difficulties, the museum was given its first phase of reorganization that continued until 1998. In 1998, work began on the second phase of reorganization.
