= Santa Maria Air Force Base =

Air base of the Brazilian Air Force

- Base Aérea de Santa Maria
- Santa Maria, Rio Grande do Sul in Brazil
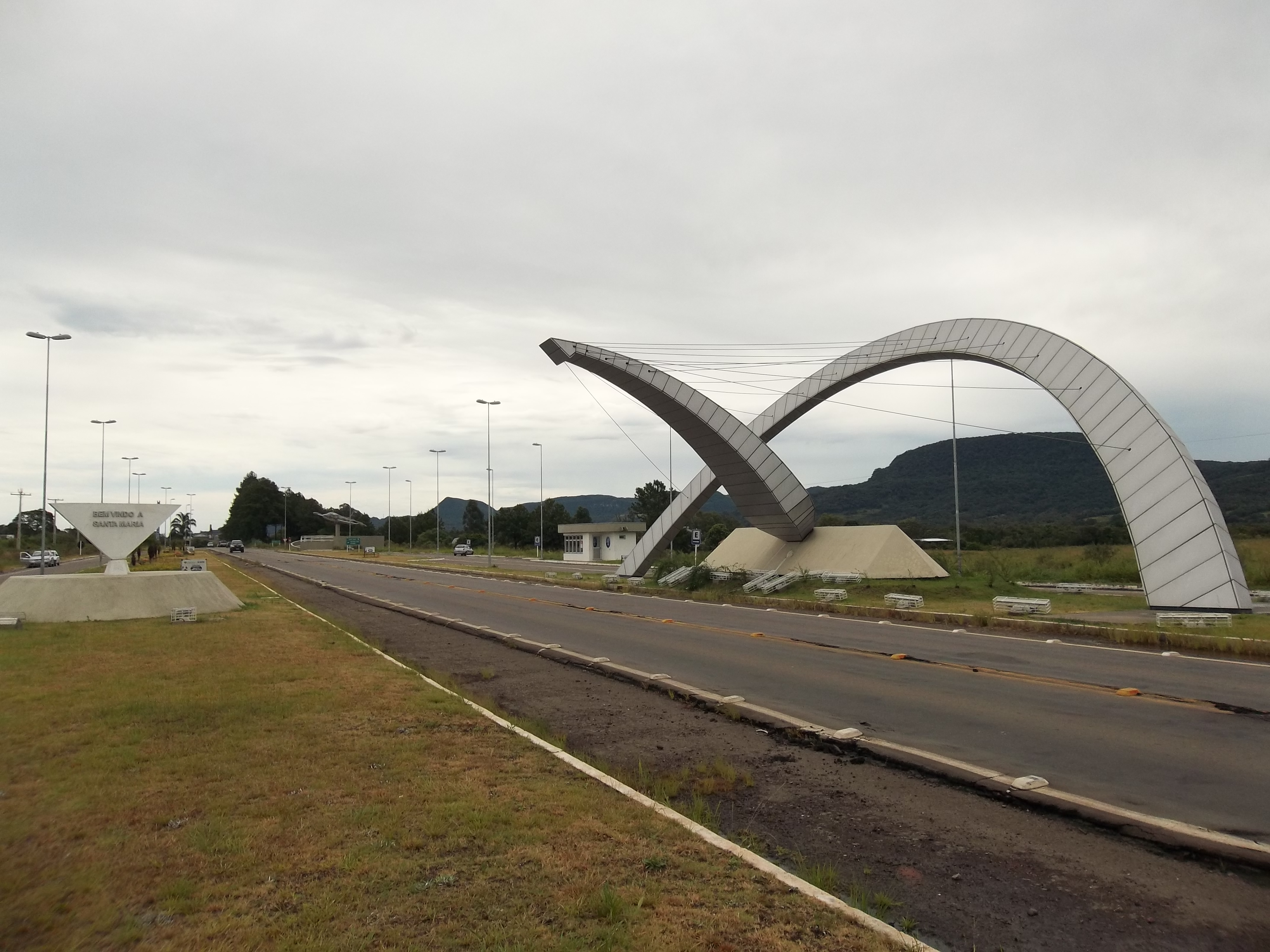
- Entry of Santa Maria Air Force in 2013

Site information
- Type: Air Force Base
- Code: ALA4
- Owner: Brazilian Air Force
- Controlled by: Brazilian Air Force
- Open to the public: No
- Website: www.fab.mil.br/organizacoes/mostra/449

Location
- Location in Brazil SBSM (Brazil)
- Coordinates: 29°42′39″S 053°41′32″W

Site history
- Built: 1945
- In use: 1970-present

Garrison information
- Current commander: Cel. Av. Wilson Paulo Corrêa Marques
- Occupants: 1st Squadron of the 10th Aviation Group; 3rd Squadron of the 10th Aviation Group; 5th Squadron of the 8th Aviation Group; 1st Squadron of the 12th Aviation Group; 4th Squadron of the 1st Communications and Control Group

Airfield information
- Identifiers: IATA: RIA, ICAO: SBSM, LID: RS0003
- Elevation: 88 metres (289 ft) AMSL
Runways
Direction	Length and surface
11/29	2,694 metres (8,839 ft) Concrete
02/20	1,505 metres (4,938 ft) Asphalt

Santa Maria Air Force Base – ALA4 (IATA: RIA, ICAO: SBSM) is a base of the Brazilian Air Force, located in Santa Maria, Brazil.

It shares some facilities with Santa Maria Airport.

== History ==
In 1944 the then President of Brazil Getúlio Vargas allocated an area of 4 million square meters near Santa Maria with the purpose of building an aerodrome. The works were conducted on an urgent basis, with the collaboration of the United States Army and it was finally opened in April 1945.

Santa Maria Air Force Base was created on 18 December 1970 and was commissioned on 15 October 1971 and since then it has an active presence in the region.

Between 1971 and 2015, civil and military facilities were shared. However, in 2015 an agreement between the Brazilian Air Force and the Municipality of Santa Maria, transferred part of the facilities to the latter. The civil portion of the aerodrome is administered by the Municipality and the military portion by the Brazilian Air Force.

== Units ==
The following units are based at Santa Maria Air Force Base:

- 1st Squadron of the 10th Aviation Group (1º/10ºGAv) Poker, using the AMX A-1M.
- 3rd Squadron of the 10th Aviation Group (3º/10ºGAv) Centauro, using the AMX A-1M.
- 5th Squadron of the 8th Aviation Group (5º/8ºGAv) Pantera, using the H-60L Black Hawk.
- 1st Squadron of the 12th Aviation Group (1º/12ºGAv) Hórus, using the Elbit RQ-450 Hermes, Elbit RQ-900 Hermes, and Elbit RQ-1150 Heron.
- 4th Squadron of the 1st Communications and Control Group (4º/1ºGCC) Mangrulho, using radars and equipment for air defense.

== Accidents and incidents ==
- 24 June 1985: Brazilian Air Force, a Lockheed C-130E Hercules registration FAB-2457 flew into the side of a hill while on approach to land at Santa Maria Air Force Base under fog. All 7 occupants died.

== Access ==
The base is located 11 km east of downtown Santa Maria.

== Gallery ==
This gallery displays aircraft that are or have been based at Santa Maria. The gallery is not comprehensive.

=== Present aircraft ===
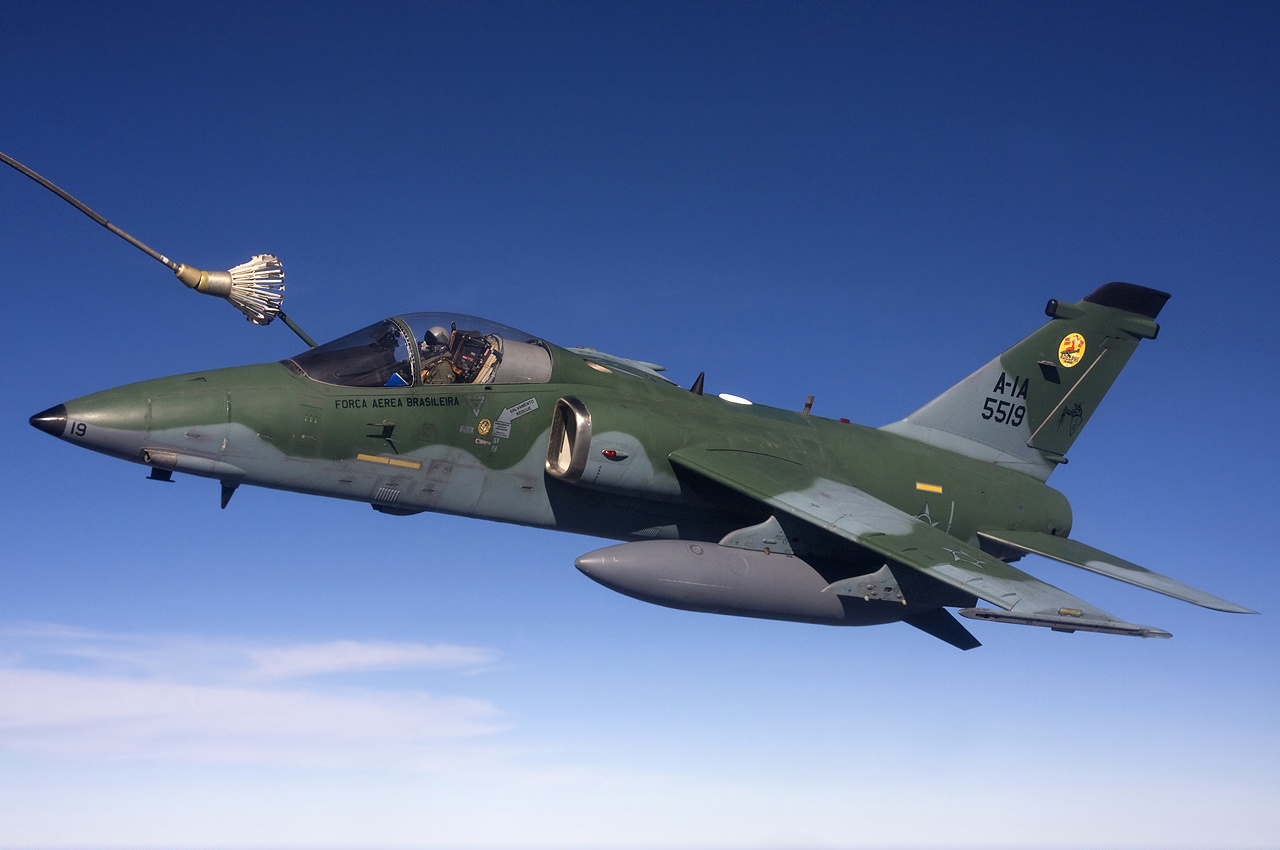
AMX A-1M

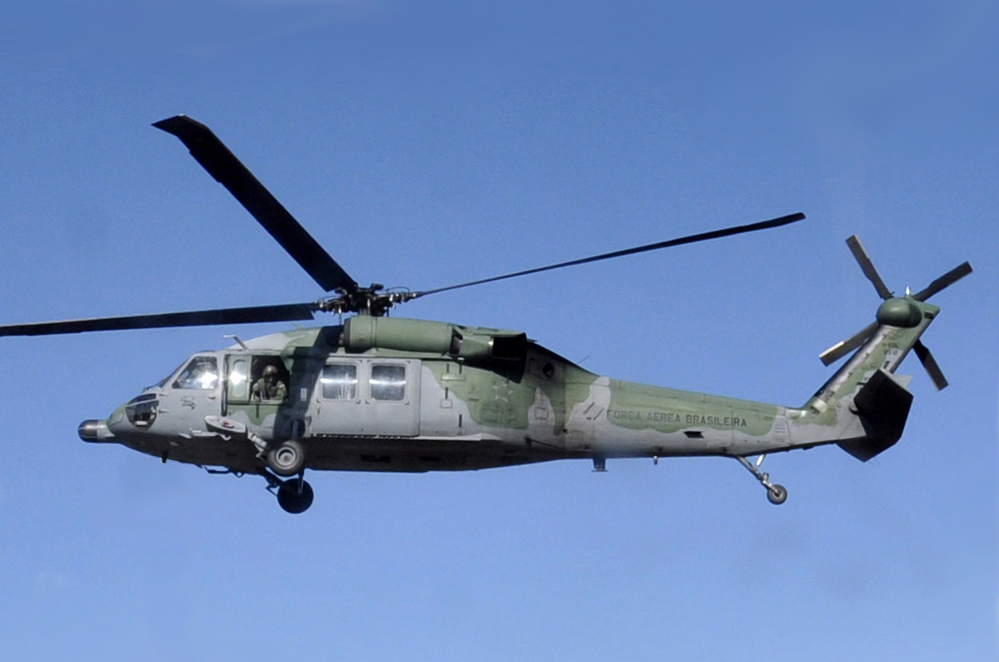
Sikorsky H-60L Black Hawk

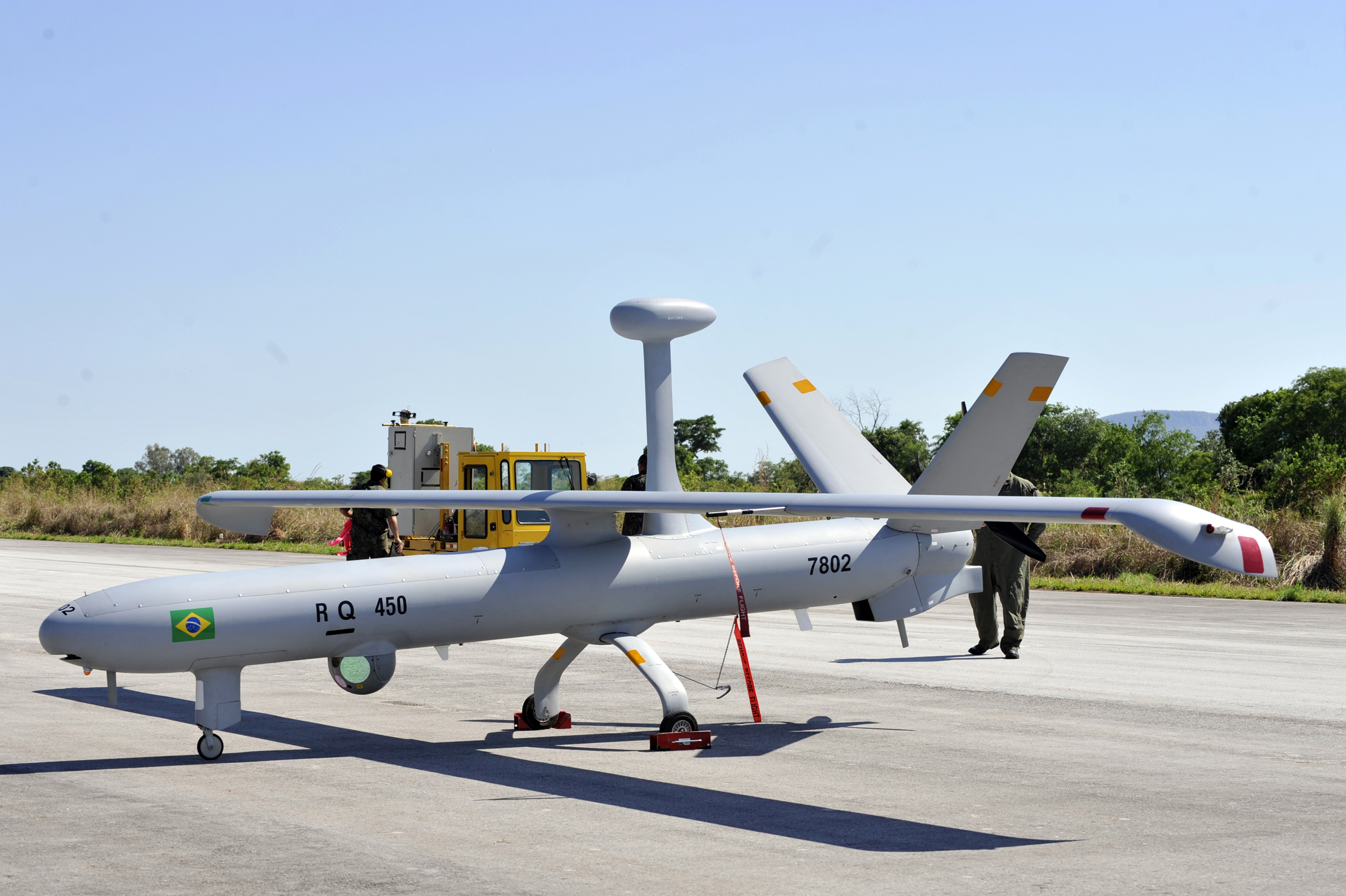
Elbit RQ-450 Hermes

=== Retired aircraft ===
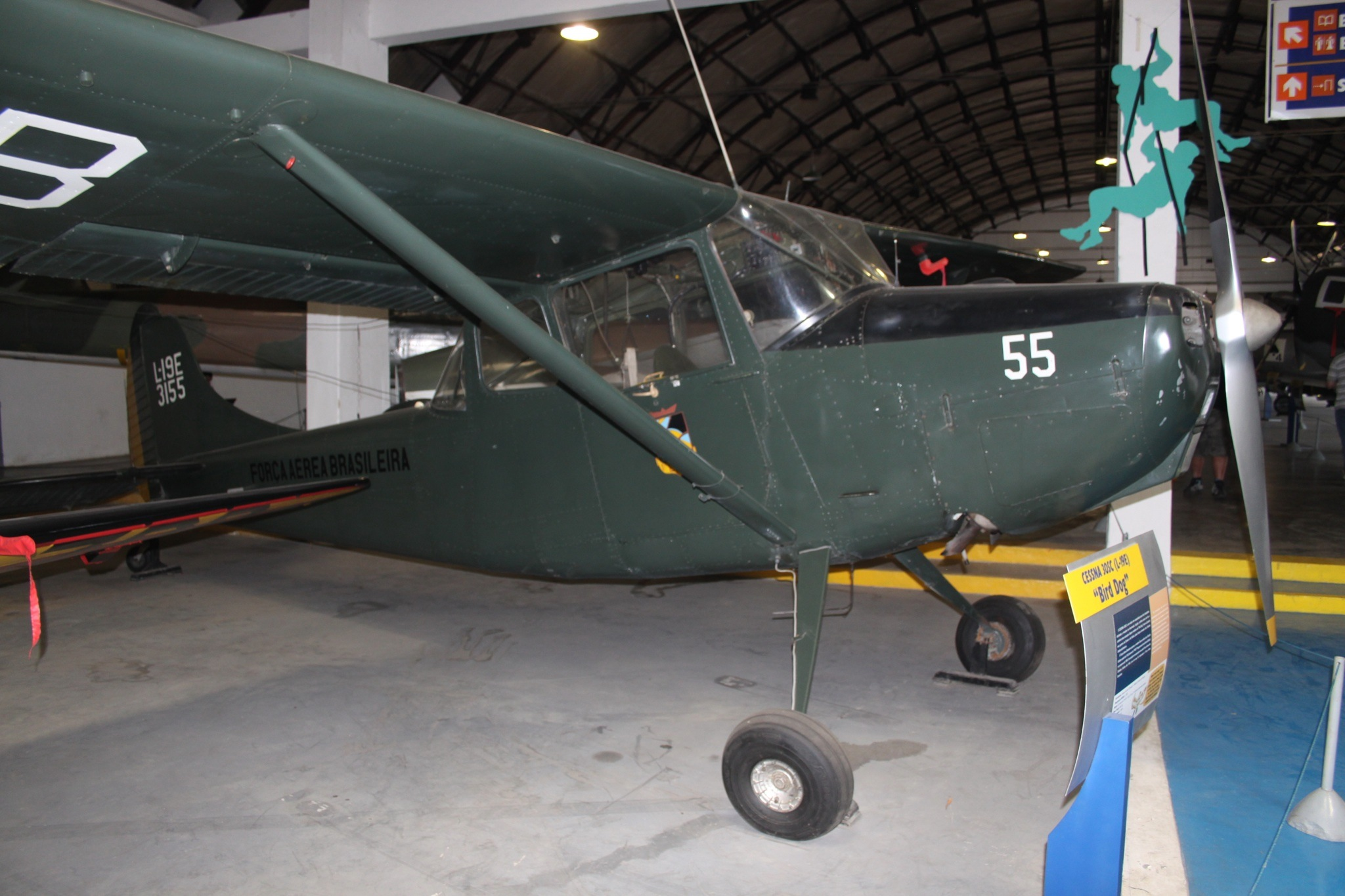
Cessna L-19A Bird Dog

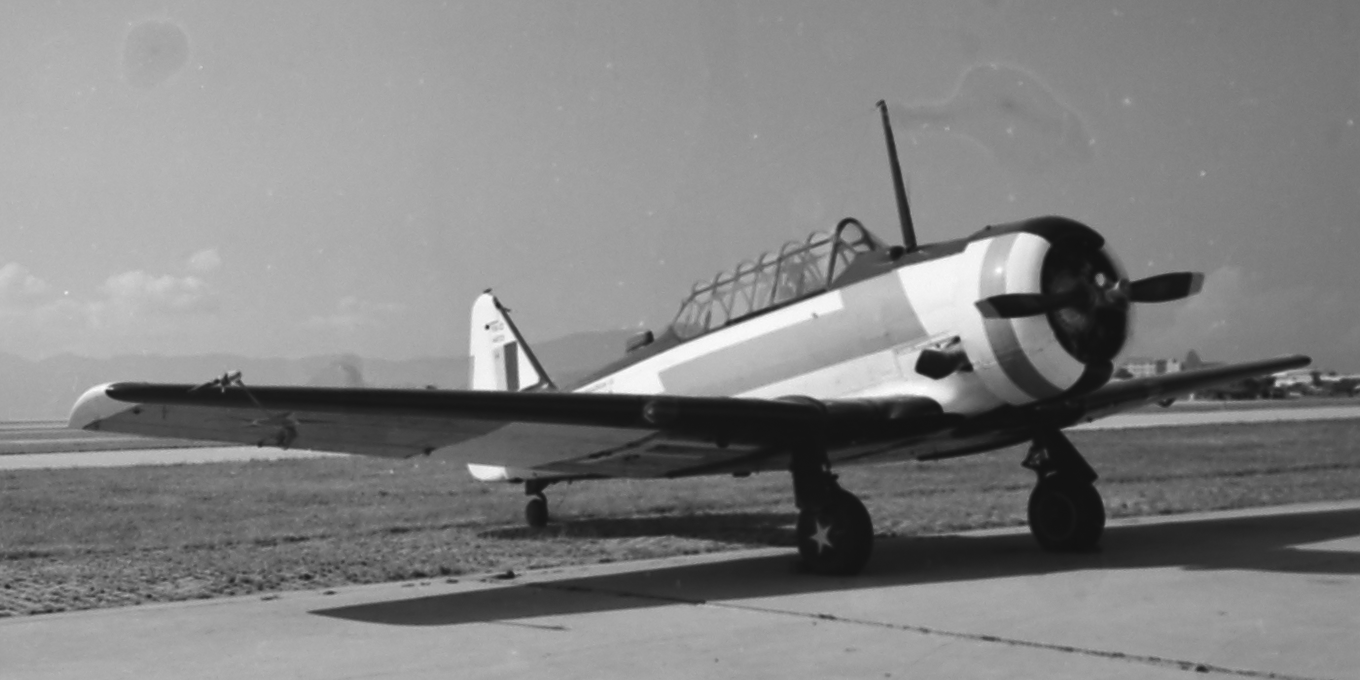
North American T-6G Texan

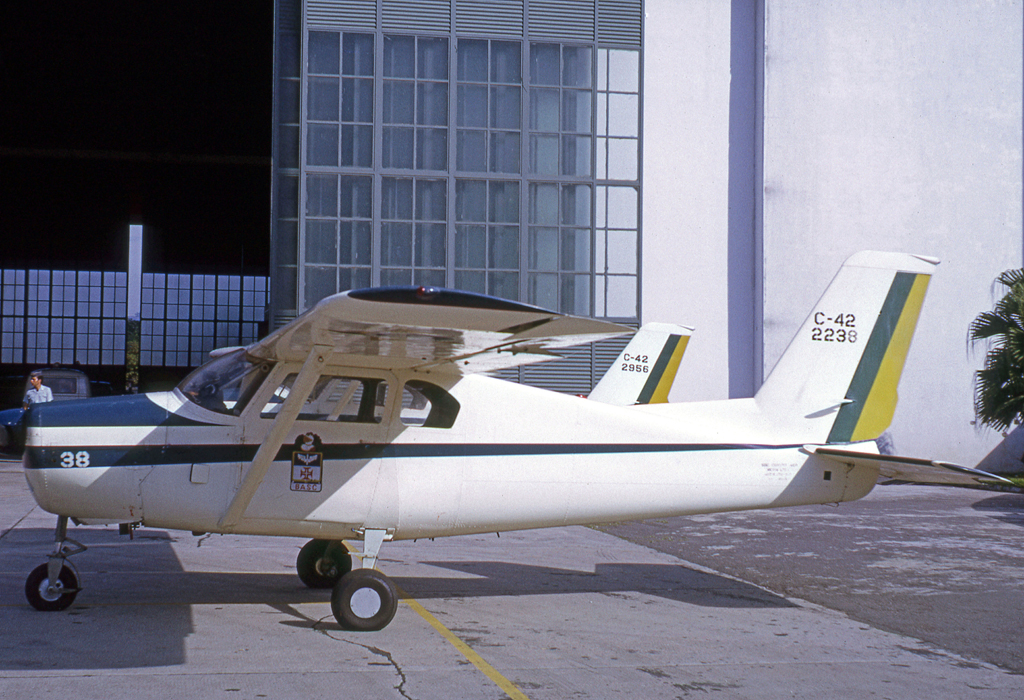
Neiva L-42 Regente

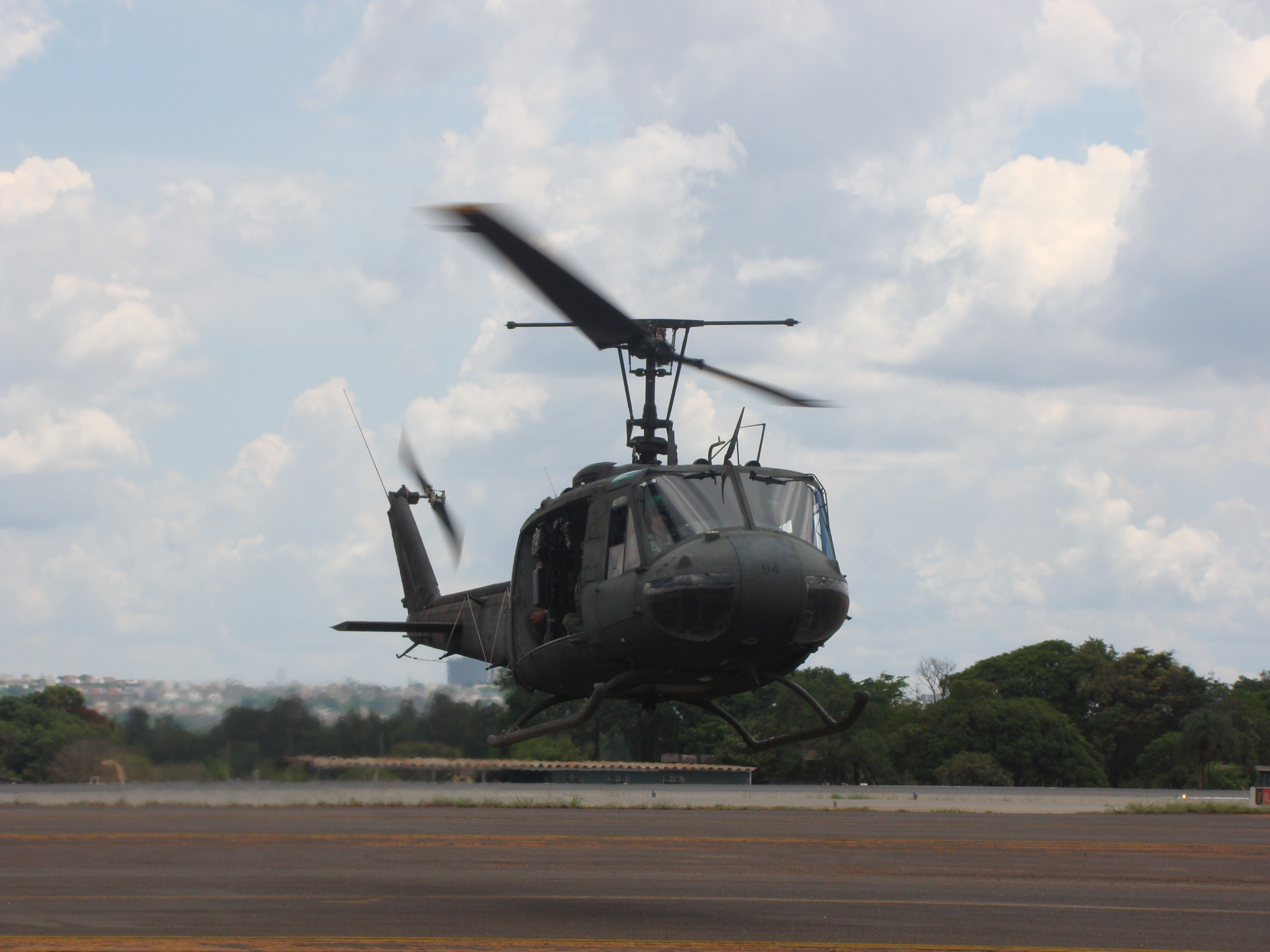
Bell H-1H Iroquois

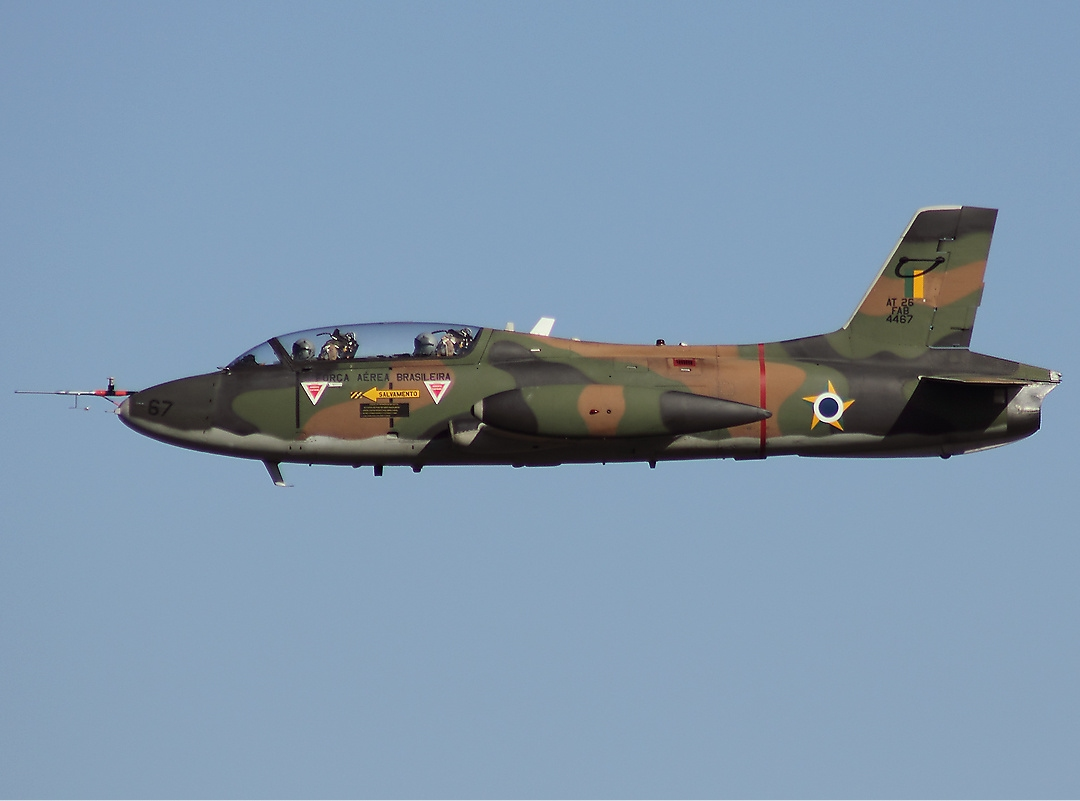
Embraer AT-26 Xavante

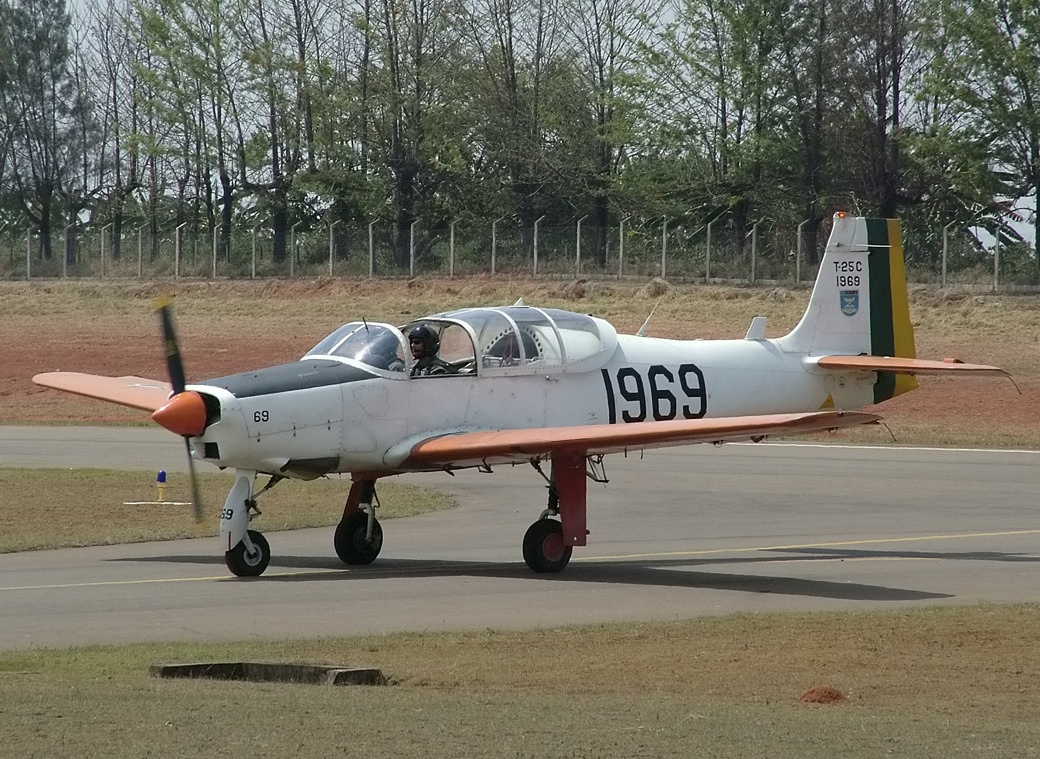
Neiva T-25A Universal

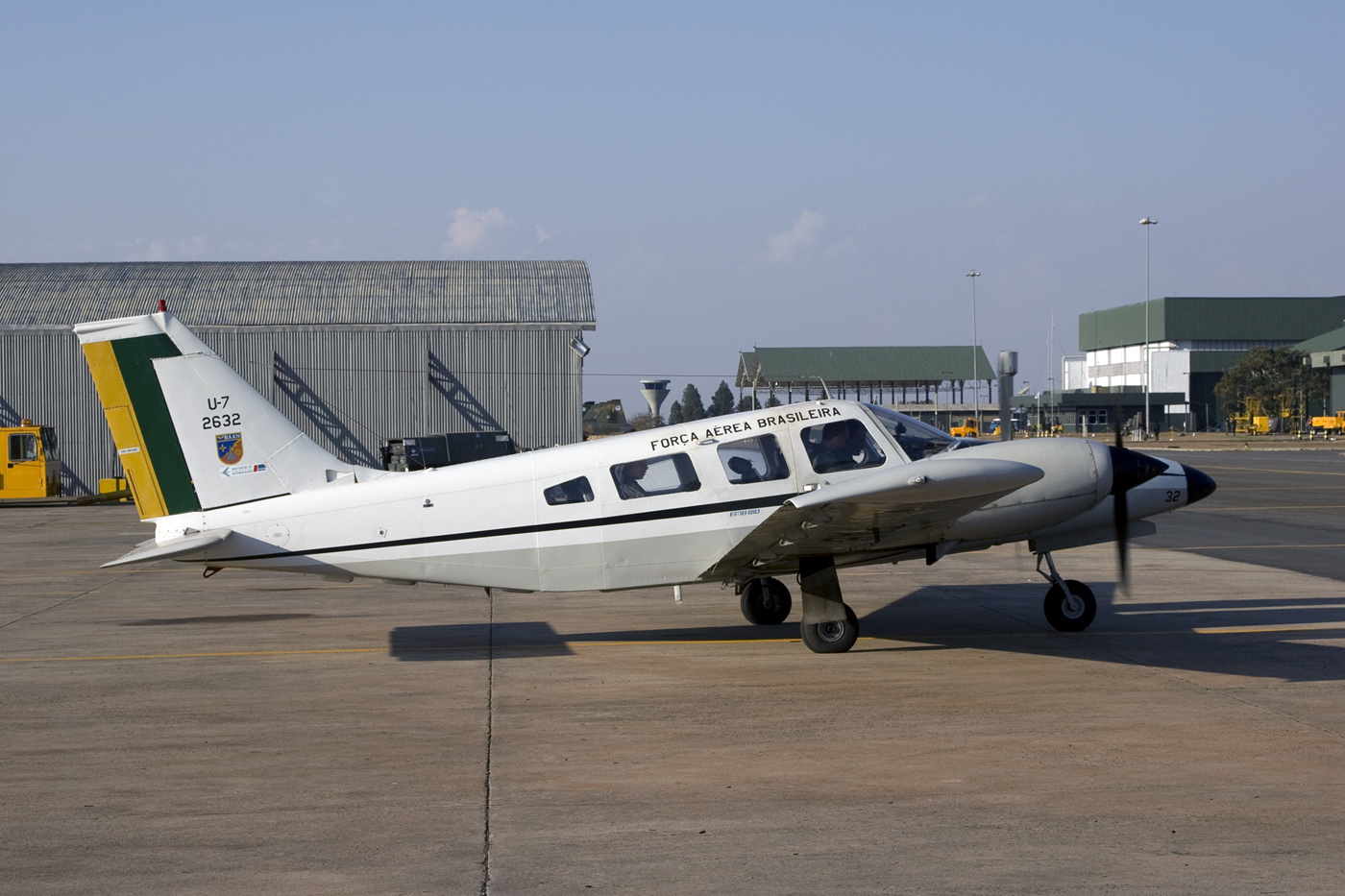
Embraer U-7 Seneca

== See also ==
- List of Brazilian military bases
- Santa Maria Airport
