= Atílio Munari =

Brazilian paleontologist

- Born: 1901; Santa Maria, Rio Grande do Sul
- Died: October 19, 1941; Santa Maria, Rio Grande do Sul
- Scientific career
- Fields: paleontologist

Atílio Munari (1901 – 19 October 1941) was a Brazilian paleontologist.

== Biography ==
Munari was born in Santa Maria, Rio Grande do Sul, Brazil. He lived near the Sanga da Alemoa, and when he was 14 years old, he lived with the scientist H. Lotz, a German paleontologist, who taught him to collecting and preparing fossils. Many of the fossils collected by him, are now in Rio de Janeiro, Porto Alegre and Santa Maria. Helped a lot of paleontologists who visited the city of Santa Maria. Has contributed considerably to the Geopark of Paleorrota.

In his honor, the city of Santa Maria, received the Atilio Munari street. He was buried in São José Cemetery, near where he was collecting fossils.
