= Paleontological Sites of Santa Maria =

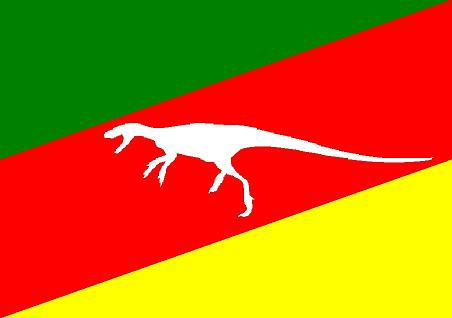
- Interactive map of Paleontological Sites of Santa Maria
- Location: Paleorrota Geopark; Santa Maria, Rio Grande do Sul, Brazil
- Coordinates: 29°41′42″S 53°47′43″W

The Paleontological Sites of Santa Maria are located in the city of Santa Maria, Rio Grande do Sul, Brazil and dating from the Triassic. Are in the Santa Maria Formation and Caturrita Formation.

== History ==
In 1901 the first fossils were found in the town of Santa Maria, which began the Geopark Paleorrota. Since then many sites have been discovered in the city, especially near the Hill Cerrito, with outstanding attention to Sanga da Alemoa that have rich history.

== Tourism ==
The city of Santa Maria is a major road junction, with several highways across the city. The Hill Cerrito is surrounded by highways BR-287, BR-158 and RS-509. You should be prepared to receive tourists.

== Museums ==
Santa Maria has two museums that contain fossils of the region:

- Museum Vincente Pallotti
- Educational Museum Gama D'Eça

== Description of sites ==
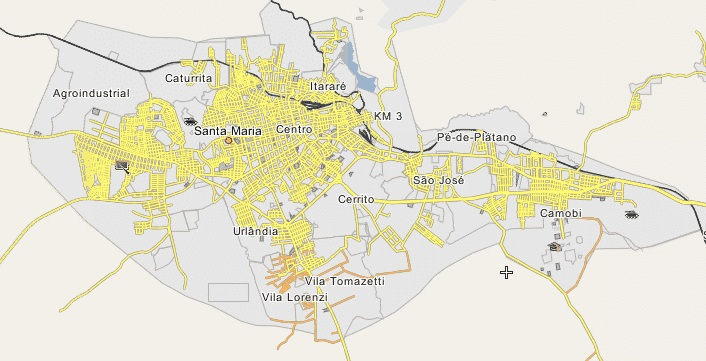
Paleontological Sites of Santa Maria:
- 1) Arroio Cancela
- 2) Cabeceira do Raimundo
- 3) Arroio Passo das Tropas
- 4) Olaria Campus UFSM
- 5) Colégio Militar
- 6) Largo Padre Cargnin
- 7) Cerrito I
- 8) Cerrito II
- 9) Cerrito III
- 10) Sanga of Alemoa
- 11) Jazigo 5
- 12) Sanga do Armário
- 13) Vila dos Sargentos
- 14) Cidade dos Meninos
- 15) Vila Kennedy
- 16) Vila Caturrita
- 17) Bela Vista
- 18) Jardim Berleze
- 19) Esc. Xavier da Rocha
- 20) Silva Jardim

| Seq. | Sitio | Coordinates | Formation | Description |
|---|---|---|---|---|
| 1 | Arroio Cancela | 29.695°S 53.79527°W | Santa Maria Formation | See: Paleontological Site Arroio Cancela. |
| 2 | Cabeceira do Raimundo | 29.71677°S 53.89963°W | Sanga do Cabral Formation | Disarticulated from Procolophon pricei. |
| 3 | Arroio Passo das Tropas | 29.74227°S 53.79280°W | Santa Maria Formation | Vegetables prints Dicroidium flora, fish scales and wings of insects. |
| 4 | Olaria Campus UFSM | 29.72717°S 53.70725°W | Santa Maria Formation | Vegetables prints Dicroidium flora. |
| 5 | Colégio Militar | 29.68027°S 53.84264°W | Santa Maria Formation | Hyperodapedon. |
| 6 | Largo Padre Cargnin | 29.69934°S 53.79084°W | Santa Maria Formation | Therioherpeton cargnini. |
| 7 | Cerrito I | 29.70129°S 53.79101°W | Santa Maria Formation and Caturrita Formation | Hyperodapedon, Stagonolepis and undetermined Cynodonts. |
| 8 | Cerrito II | 29.70434°S 53.78809°W | Santa Maria Formation and Caturrita Formation | Hyperodapedon. |
| 9 | Cerrito III | 29.70600°S 53.78597°W | Santa Maria Formation and Caturrita Formation | Hyperodapedon. |
| 10 | Sanga Alemoa | 29.69777°S 53.76944°W | Santa Maria Formation and Caturrita Formation | See: Paleontological Site Sanga of Alemoa |
| 11 | Jazigo Cinco | 29.69807°S 53.76851°W | Santa Maria Formation | See: Paleontological Site Jazigo Cinco. |
| 12 | Sanga do Armário | 29.69629°S 53.75854°W | Santa Maria Formation | Hyperodapedon. |
| 13 | Vila dos Sargentos | 29.69711°S 53.73936°W | Santa Maria Formation | Bioturbation Verticalized. |
| 14 | Cidade dos Meninos | 29.68212°S 53.72047°W | Santa Maria Formation | Hyperodapedon, osteoderms of Stagonolepis and undetermined Cynodonts. |
| 15 | Vila Kennedy | 29.66868°S 53.82553°W | Santa Maria Formation | Hyperodapedon. |
| 16 | Vila Caturrita | 29.66561°S 53.84249°W | Santa Maria Formation and Caturrita Formation | Hyperodapedon. |
| 17 | Bela Vista | 29.69286°S 53.78393°W | Caturrita Formation | Fragments of indeterminate skulls. |
| 18 | Jardim Berleze | 29.71402°S 53.77921°W | Caturrita Formation | Petrified wood. |
| 19 | Esc. Xavier da Rocha | 29.67678°S 53.79680°W | Caturrita Formation | Petrified wood. |
| 20 | Silva Jardim | 29.68099°S 53.80042°W | Caturrita Formation | Petrified wood. |

== Notes and references ==
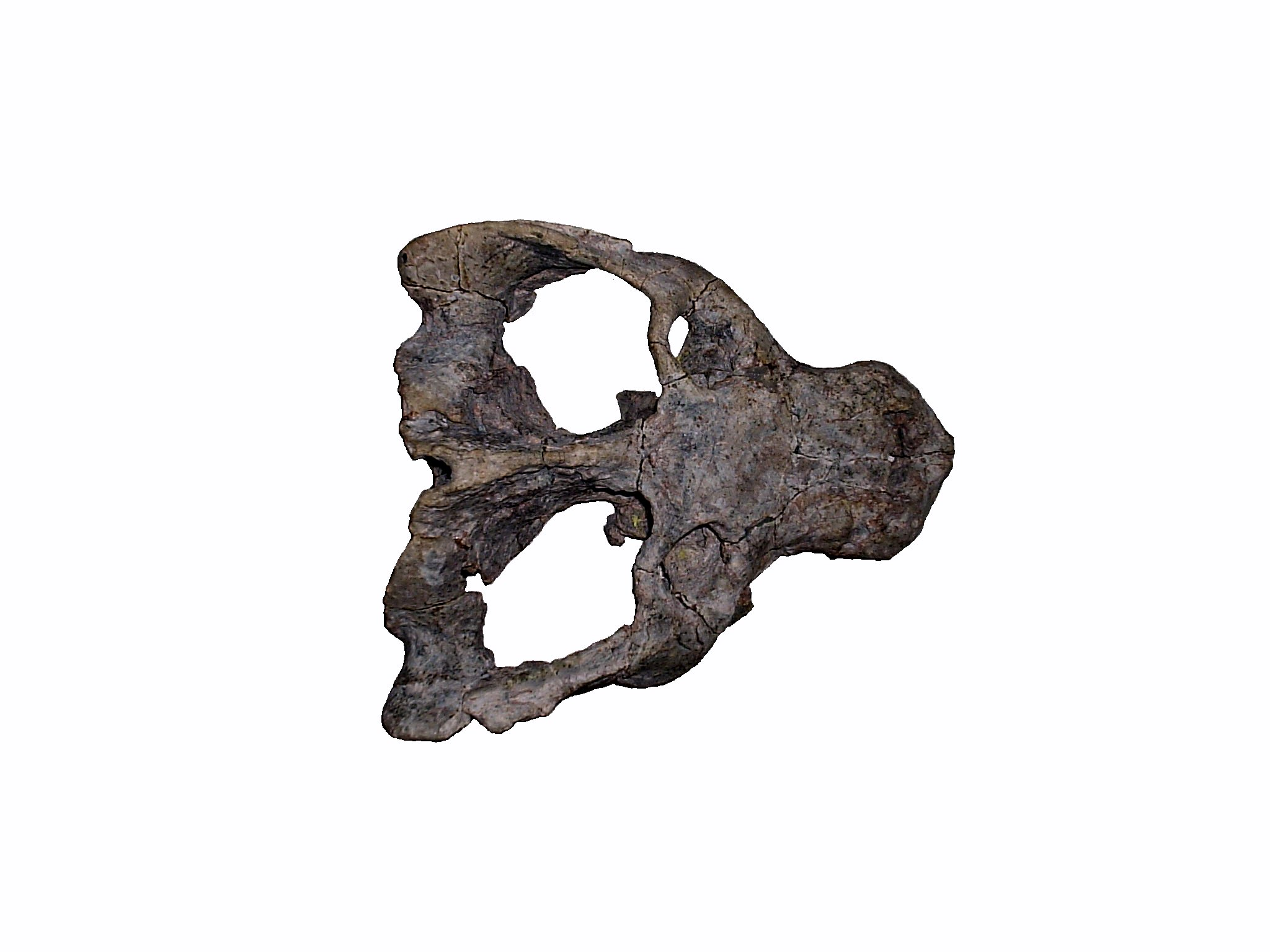
Young Exaeretodon, collected by Sergio Kaminski, in the Paleontological Site Arroio Cancela

== See also ==
- Paleorrota Geopark
- Museum Vincente Pallotti
- Educational Museum Gama D'Eça
- Paleontological Site Arroio Cancela
- Paleontological Site Sanga of Alemoa
- Paleontological Site Jazigo Cinco
