= Sanga da Alemoa =

Paleontological site in Santa Maria

Sanga da Alemoa Paleontological Site
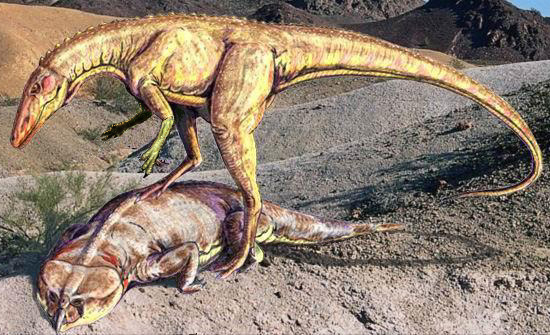
- Staurikosaurus feeding on a rhynchosaur.
- Interactive map of Sanga da Alemoa; Paleontological Site
- Location: Paleorrota Geopark, Santa Maria, Rio Grande do Sul, Brazil
- Coordinates: 29°41′52″S 53°46′10″W

The Sanga da Alemoa paleontological site is located in the city of Santa Maria, Rio Grande do Sul, in Brazil. It belongs to the Caturrita Formation and the Santa Maria Formation. It is located in the neighborhood of Castelinho. The site belongs to the paleorrota region.

== History ==
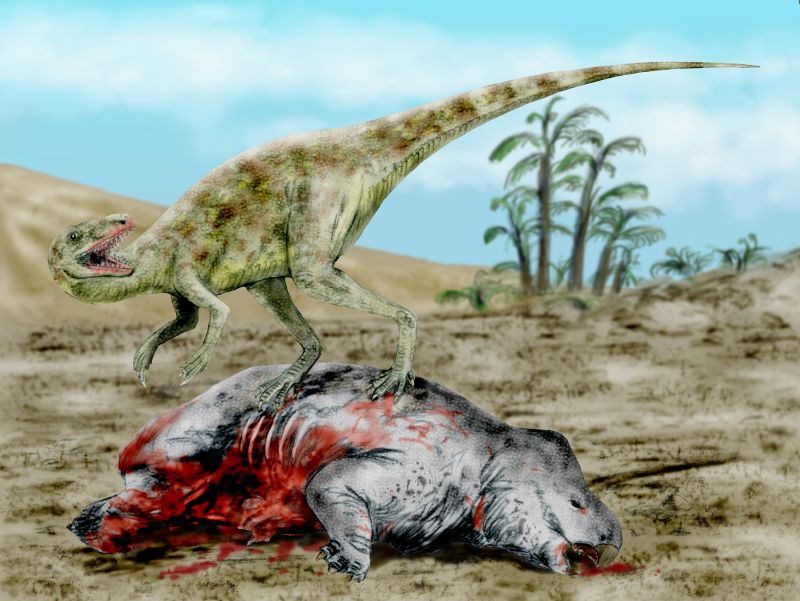
Staurikosaurus

Historically the Sanga da Alemoa is one of the most important paleontological sites in Brazil. It was this site that came out Staurikosaurus, the first Brazilian dinosaur and one of the oldest found in the world. Researchers collected fossil in this site that drew attention of international researchers who later visited the region. These local researchers shaped the paleontological research in the region and Brazil. For all these contributions and historical factors, the Sanga da Alemoa is now known internationally.

The site was discovered by Professor and geographer Antero de Almeida, in 1901, when the first fossil was found at the site and also the first fossil of paleorrota.

In 1902, Dr. Jango Fischer, born in Santa Maria, collected fossils on site that were sent to Arthur Smith Woodward, the eminent paleontologist at the British Museum in London. The rhynchosaur found, Scaphonyx fischeri was named in honor of Jango Fischer.

In May 1906 the Brazilian engineer Cicero Campos collected fossils that were sent to Arthur Smith Woodward.

Between 1915 and 1917, Dr. Guilherme Rau, a German who took up residence in Santa Maria, helped the German scientist Dr. H. Lotz, who collected 200 pieces on the Site. This material was sent to Von Huene, Germany. During this time a boy of 14 years of age, Atílio Munari, who lived near the site (Schirmer village), went to live with the scientist H. Lotz, who taught him to collect and prepare the fossils. Many of his works are now in Rio de Janeiro, Porto Alegre and Santa Maria.

Llewellyn Ivor Price, was born in Santa Maria in 1905, and completed his studies at Harvard University, USA. He returned to Santa Maria in 1936, bringing along his colleague Theodore E. White. Both came into contact with the Munari who helped in their excavations at this site. This year was collected Staurikosaurus, the first Brazilian dinosaur. Price was the first totally Brazilian paleontologist and helped define the whole structure of paleontological research in Brazil. In 1925, the German paleontologist Dr. Bruno von Freyberg, University of Halle-Wittenberg, visited the site. That same year Dr. G. Florence and Pacheco of the Geological and geographical Commission of Sao Paulo were in place.

In 1927, Guilherme Rau collected the cynodont Gomphodontosuchus brasiliensis.

In 1927, geologists Paulino Franco de Carvalho and Nero Passos visited Santa Maria. This year also the geologist Alex Löfgren joined, who was here for a year and a half, helped by Munari. In 1928 the German paleontologist Friedrich von Huene visited the area, accompanied by Dr. Rudolf Stahlecker. They spent six months at the site and returned to Germany with many tons of fossils. Many fossils that were collected are housed at the University of Tübingen, Germany. During this period had been staying at the home of Guilherme Hübner, located within the site.

Fossils of Cerritosaurus were collected in 1941 by the Jesuit Antonio Binsfeld, of Seminary São José in Santa Maria.

In the 1940s and 1950s, expeditions organized by Llewellyn Ivor Price, the Division of Paleontology at the National Department of Mineral Production of Rio de Janeiro, arriving in the region. Price has worked in the area along with Edwin Harris Colbert, Carlos de Paula Couto, Mackenzie Gondon, Fausto Luis de Souza Cunha and Theodore E. White. In Santa Maria, Price stayed at Centenário College. Between 1968 and 1973, priest Daniel Cargnin collected many fossils at the site, which were sent to several research institutions and museums.

In 1999, Max Cardoso Langer and colleagues collected on the spot the dinosaur Saturnalia tupiniquim.

In honor of the researchers Atílio Munari and Daniel Cargnin, streets near the site received their names.

Atílio Munari's body rests in São José Cemetery, near the site.

== Researchers who were at the site ==
- Antero de Almeida (1901)
- Jango Fischer (1902)
- Guilherme Rau (1915–1917, 1927)
- Friedrich von Huene (1928)
- Rudolf Stahlecker (1928)
- Atílio Munari
- Llewellyn Ivor Price
- Edwin Harris Colbert
- Daniel Cargnin (1968–1973)
- Carlos de Paula Couto
- H. Lotz
- Theodore E. White
- Bruno von Freyberg (1925)
- Paulino Franco de Carvalho
- Nero Passos
- Alex Löfgren
- Antonio Binsfeld
- Mackenzie Gondon
- Fausto Luís de Souza Cunha
- Cícero Campos

== Fossil fauna found ==
- Staurikosaurus
- Rhynchosaur (Scaphonyx fischeri)
- Gomphodontosuchus brasiliensis
- Cerritosaurus
- Saturnalia tupiniquim

== Paleontological tourism ==
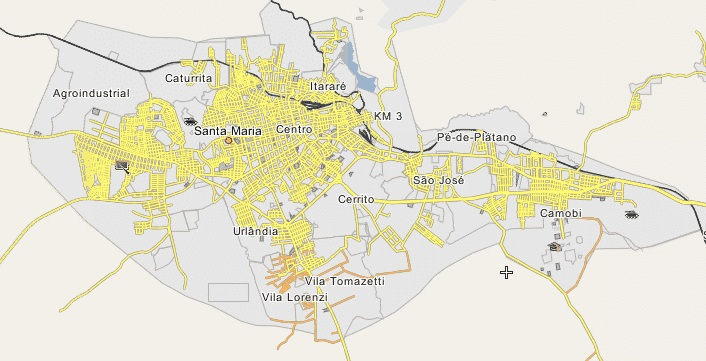
Paleontological Sites of Santa Maria:
- 1) Arroio Cancela
- 2) Cabeceira do Raimundo
- 3) Arroio Passo das Tropas
- 4) Olaria Campus UFSM
- 5) Colégio Militar
- 6) Largo Padre Cargnin
- 7) Cerrito I
- 8) Cerrito II
- 9) Cerrito III
- 10) Sanga of Alemoa
- 11) Jazigo 5
- 12) Sanga do Armário
- 13) Vila dos Sargentos
- 14) Cidade dos Meninos
- 15) Vila Kennedy
- 16) Vila Caturrita
- 17) Bela Vista
- 18) Jardim Berleze
- 19) Esc. Xavier da Rocha
- 20) Silva Jardim

Historically this is the most important paleontological site of Rio Grande do Sul this location was found the first fossil of Geopark Paleorrota and also the first Brazilian dinosaur Staurikosaurus and one of the oldest found on the planet. Great researchers have gone through this site and helped form the Brazilian paleontology.

The site is known internationally for his outstanding contributions and is in the urban area of Santa Maria city, near a major road junction, with great handling car, and even then, there is a project to make the place a tourist spot. Lack responsibility and political involvement on the part of municipal and state authorities.
