= Santa Maria Airport (Rio Grande do Sul) =

Santa Maria Airport Aeroporto de Santa Maria
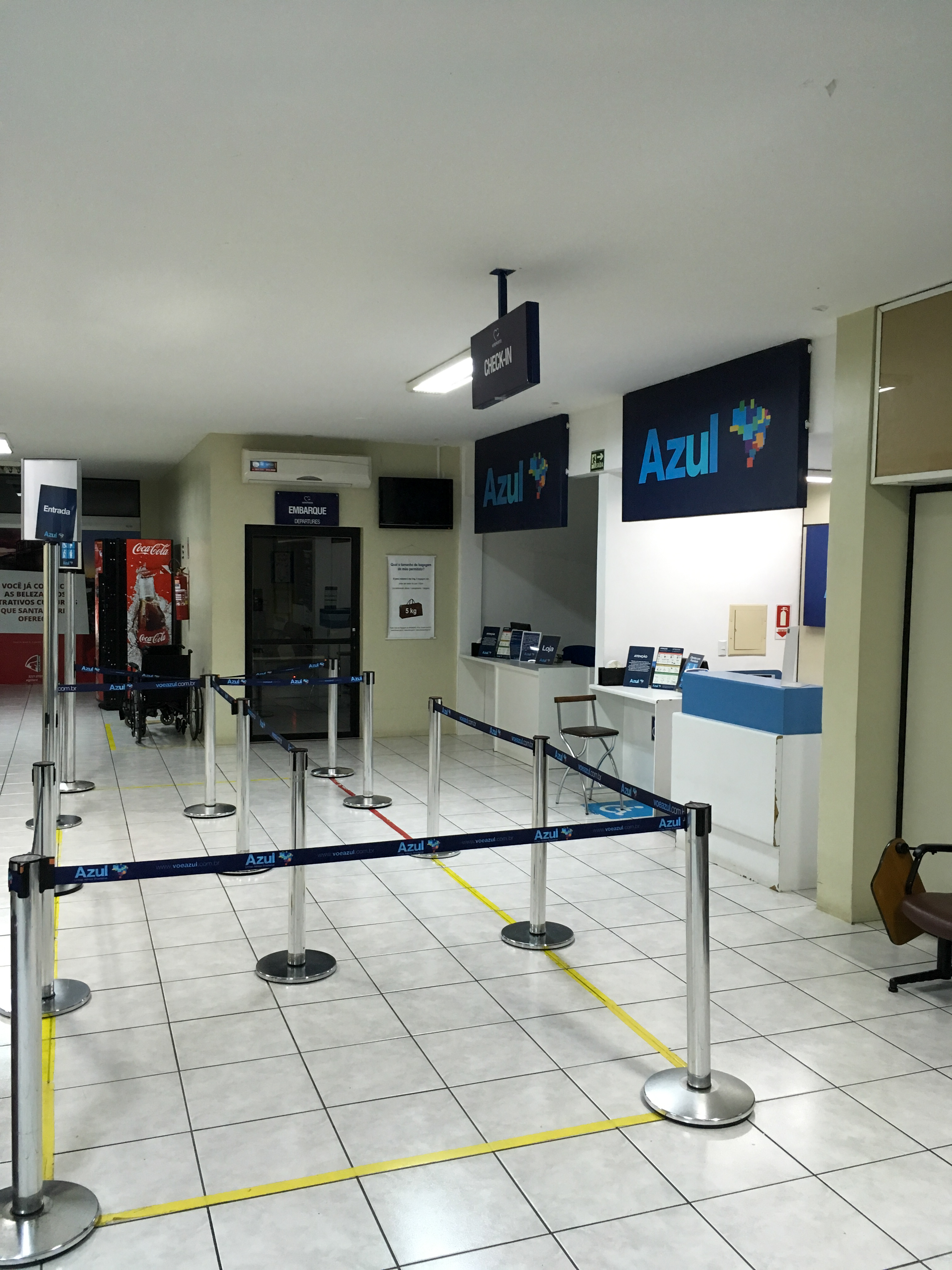
- The check-in area at Santa Maria Airport
- IATA: RIA; ICAO: SBSM; LID: RS0003

Summary
- Airport type: Public/Military
- Operator: Santa Maria Air Force Base (1971–2015); Santa Maria (2015–present)
- Serves: Santa Maria
- Time zone: BRT (UTC−03:00)
- Elevation AMSL: 88 m (289 ft)
- Coordinates: 29°42′39″S 053°41′32″W

Map
- Location in Brazil RIA (Brazil)

Runways
Direction	Length		Surface
Direction	m	ft	Surface
11/29	2,694	8,839	Concrete
02/20	1,505	4,938	Asphalt
- Sources: ANAC, DECEA

Santa Maria Airport (IATA: RIA, ICAO: SBSM) is the airport serving Santa Maria, Brazil.

It is operated by the Municipality of Santa Maria.

Some of its facilities are shared with the Santa Maria Air Force Base of the Brazilian Air Force.

== History ==
In 1944 the President of Brazil Getúlio Vargas allocated an area of 4 million square meters near Santa Maria with the purpose of building an aerodrome. The works were conducted on an urgent basis, with the collaboration of the United States Army and it was finally opened in April 1945.

Between 1971 and 2015, with the creation of the Santa Maria Air Force Base, civil and military facilities were shared. However, in 2015 an agreement between the Brazilian Air Force and the Municipality of Santa Maria, transferred part of the facilities to the latter. The civil portion of the aerodrome is administered by the Municipality and the military portion by the Brazilian Air Force.

== Airlines and destinations ==
Airlines	Destinations
Azul Brazilian Airlines	Porto Alegre

== Access ==
The airport is located 11 km (7 mi) east of downtown Santa Maria.

== See also ==
- List of airports in Brazil
- Santa Maria Air Force Base
