= Daniel Cargnin (paleontologist) =

Brazilian paleontologist (1930–2002)

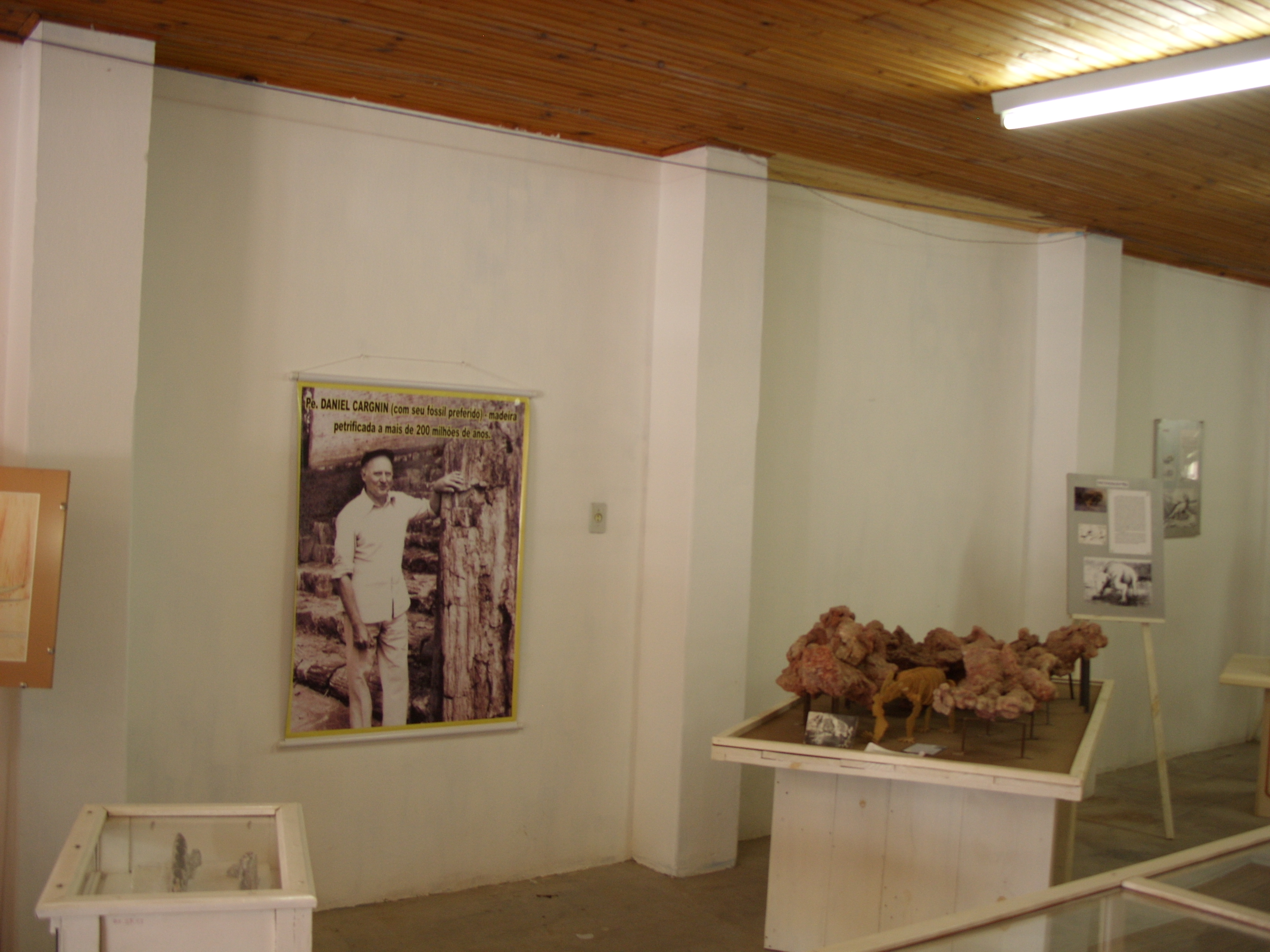
- Picture on Museum Daniel Cargnin.
- Born: 1930; Nova Palma
- Died: 2002 (aged 71–72); Mata, Rio Grande do Sul.
- Known for: Padre Cargnin
- Scientific career
- Fields: Paleontologist

Daniel Cargnin (1930–2002) was a Brazilian priest and amateur paleontologist born in Nova Palma, in the state of Rio Grande do Sul, Brazil, in 1930. He died in 2002, and at his request was buried in the town of Mata.

An autodidact and amateur paleontologist, from 1964 until 1969 he lived in the city of Santa Maria, where he made great contributions to paleontology, working in the geopark Paleorrota, contributing to the collection of the Museum Vincente Pallotti.

In 1969, along with Abraham Cargnin, he created the Museum of Paleontology of UFRGS and the PUCRS.

In 1976 he moved to the city of Mata where he contributed greatly to the preservation of fossils found in the region.

In his honor was created APEDAC (Associação Padre Daniel Cargnin) (Association Father Daniel Cargnin), which aims to divulge the geopark Paleorrota to a wider audience. The city of Mata received a museum named in his memory (Museum Daniel Cargnin).

The Paleontological Site Largo Padre Daniel Cargnin is a tribute for his contributions. Several fossils were named in his honor, such as the cynodont Therioherpeton cargnini.
