= Paleontological Site Arroio Cancela =

Arroio Cancela Paleontological Site
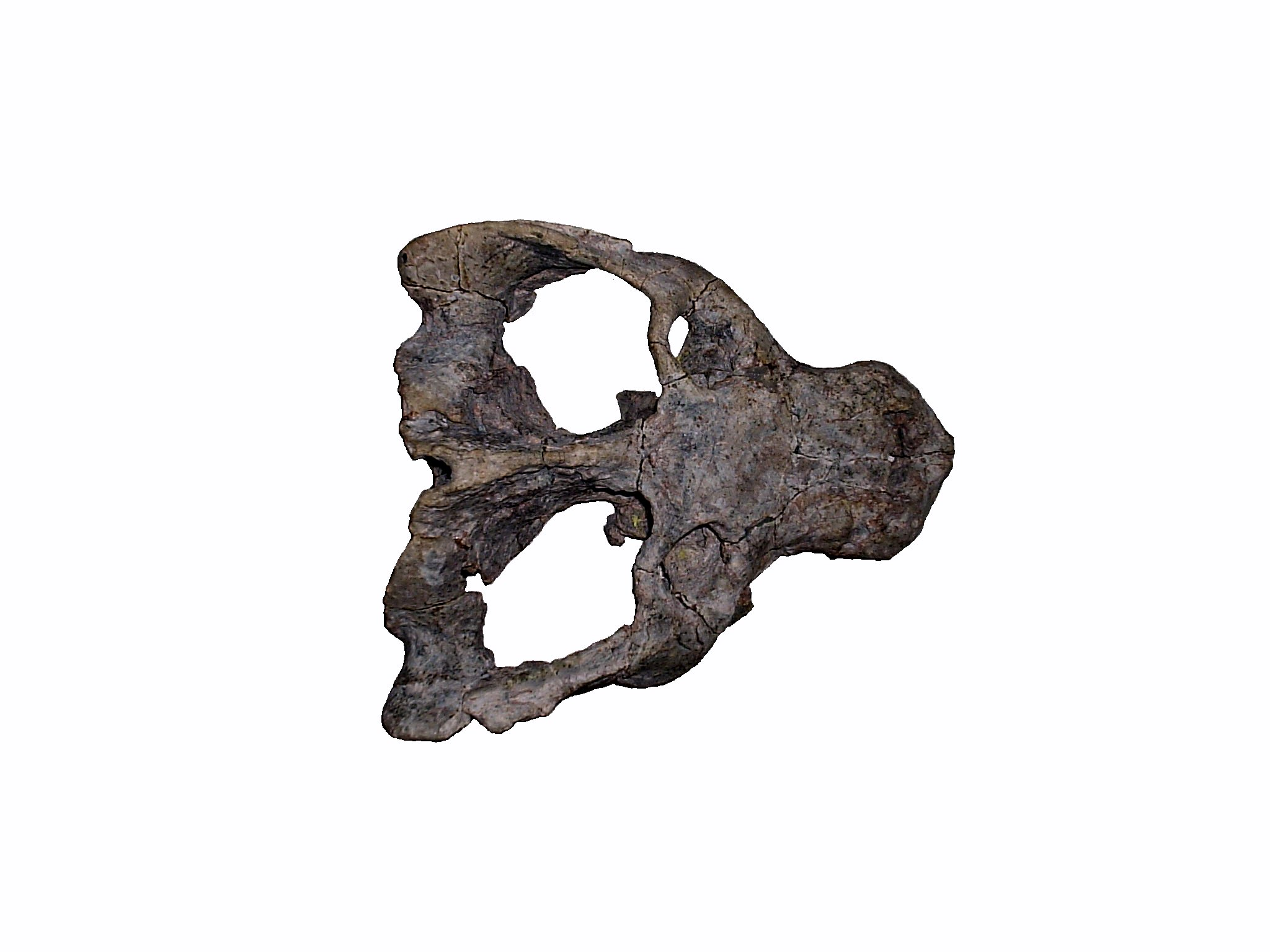
- This skull of a baby exaeretodon was found at Arroio Cancela.
- Interactive map of Arroio Cancela; Paleontological Site
- Location: Santa Maria, Rio Grande do Sul, Brazil
- Coordinates: 29°41′42″S 53°47′43″W

The Paleontological Site Arroio Cancela is located within the city of Santa Maria, a municipality of Rio Grande do Sul, the southernmost state of Brazil. The site is situated in the neighbourhood Nossa Senhora de Lourdes at approximately 110 metres above sea level. The fossils have been discovered within the sediments of the Santa Maria Formation, they are vertebrates from the Triassic period and are about 225 million years old.

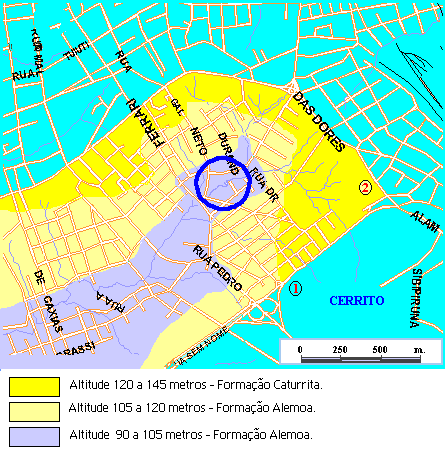
Figure 1: The Paleontological Site Arroio Cancela circled

This site is easily accessible, because the Central Bus Station Station of Santa Maria is merely 600 metres away. Only one hundred metres from the site, at the corner of the streets Irmão Donato and Otavio Alves de Oliveira, is the school State General Edson de Figueiredo and a nearby shopping centre.

Thirty-five metres higher in elevation (and stratigraphy) one finds the Paleontological Site Largo Padre Daniel Cargnin and the Paleontological Site Bela Vista. At the Paleontological Site Largo Padre Daniel Cargnin (Point 1, Figure 2) Cargnin collected a Therioherpeton cargnini and at the Paleontological Site Bela Vista (Point 2, Figure 2) fragments of an unidentified skull were discovered. The last two sites are close to the Cerrito hill and belong already to the Caturrita Formation.

== Area under study ==
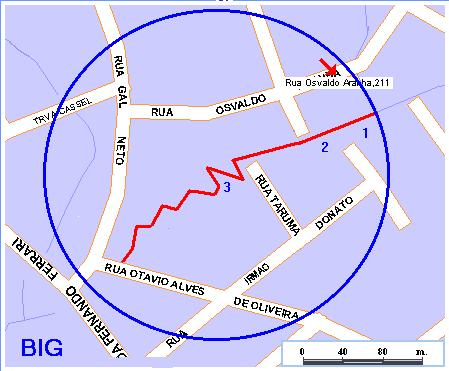
Figure 2: Close-up of the three main paleontological sites

The circled area comprises 9 hectares and is crossed by the stream (arroyo) Cancela starting at Osvaldo Aranha Street and flowing toward Fernando Ferrari Avenue. Along this stretch Triassic vertebrate fossils are found within the exposed red sediments. The main collection points are listed as 1, 2 and 3 in Figure 2. The distance from point 1 to point 3 is 185 meters, whereas the distance from point 3 to Otavio Alves de Oliveira Street is 142 meters.

Description of collection points:

1. Here a baby saurischian dinosaur was discovered in 1974, yet the exact species could not be determined. The animal measured approximately 70 cm head to tail. About 70% of the trunk bones were preserved, and about 50% of the skull bones. The vertebrae were still articulated and the entire column was present. The animal's head was rather small in relation to the body, with a long and thin tail. The teeth were rounded, not pointed as in carnivores. The taxon therefore probably was a herbivore. (This fossil was lost).
2. Here a Rhynchosaur was unearthed in 1975, it had lost its skull, but from the rest of the body approximately 30% of the bone material was preserved; its vertebrae were still articulated. (This fossil was also lost). Recently in 2005 a young Rhynchosaur was discovered in the same location, whose vertebrae were dismembered.
3. Here four Santagnathus mariensis were found in 2004, with most of the trunk bones and the vertebrae being dismembered, which means that the animals had undergone an advanced state of dismemberment before being completely covered by sediments. In 2002 a Rhynchosaur was discovered with approximately 60% of its torso preserved and the vertebrae still articulated. These fossils were donated to the UFRGS.
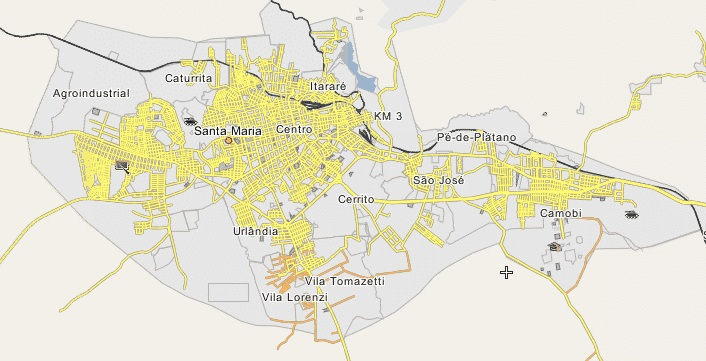
Paleontological Sites of Santa Maria:
- 1) Arroio Cancela
- 2) Cabeceira do Raimundo
- 3) Arroio Passo das Tropas
- 4) Olaria Campus UFSM
- 5) Colégio Militar
- 6) Largo Padre Cargnin
- 7) Cerrito I
- 8) Cerrito II
- 9) Cerrito III
- 10) Sanga of Alemoa
- 11) Jazigo 5
- 12) Sanga do Armário
- 13) Vila dos Sargentos
- 14) Cidade dos Meninos
- 15) Vila Kennedy
- 16) Vila Caturrita
- 17) Bela Vista
- 18) Jardim Berleze
- 19) Esc. Xavier da Rocha
- 20) Silva Jardim

== Concentration of fossils ==
The area that goes from point 1 to point 3, is 185 metres (607 ft) in length and width is 5 metres (16 ft) on average, with exposed mudstone. In total there are 925 m^{2} (9,960 sq ft) of exposed mudstone. Five digs, where they entered a fossil for each 185 m^{2} (1,990 sq ft), so there should be fossils 50 per hectare, at this location.

In the circle, with the central point the point 3, the diameter is 340 m (1,120 ft), and the area is 90,792 m^{2} (977,280 sq ft). Dividing this area by 185 m^{2} (1,990 sq ft), probably have 490 fossils within this circle, which is in the map area. This estimate were considered, only the exposed area, as if in two dimensions, regardless of the depth.

There is a height difference of more than 3 meters between point 1 and point 3. All this indicates that fossils were deposited at this location for a long time, and there may be more fossils below the stream.

Assuming that each meter of depth there are four layers of fossils, means that the estimated number of 490 can be multiplied by four to give the 1960 fossil every meter deep excavated. Thus, it is likely that there are between 500-2000 fossils in this study area. But this number may be higher since there are two other sites nearby and 30 meters above the site. This means that this area can extrapolate in breadth and depth.

== See also ==
- Paleontology
