= Paleontological Site Jazigo Cinco =

Paleontological site in Santa Maria, Brazil

Jazigo Cinco Paleontological Site
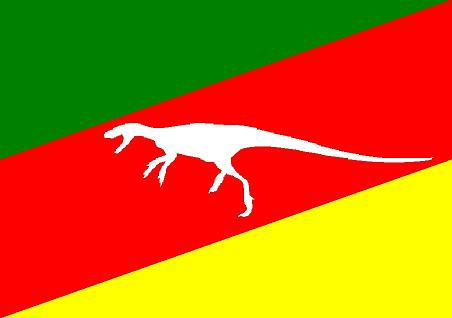
- Paleorrota's Flag
- Interactive map of Jazigo Cinco; Paleontological Site
- Location: Paleorrota Geopark, Santa Maria, Rio Grande do Sul, Brazil.
- Coordinates: 29°41′53″S 53°46′07″W

Paleontological Site Jazigo Cinco is located in the city of Santa Maria, Rio Grande do Sul, Brazil. And belongs to Santa Maria Formation. It is located in the neighborhood Kilometro 3 near Castelinho, is to 2.7 kilometers away from the Paleontological Site Arroio Cancela. It belongs to UFSM (Federal University of Santa Maria) and is a center of research. The partial skeleton of a new genus of dinosaur was found here in 1936, and described and named Staurikosaurus in 1970. This was the first Brazilian dinosaur.

== See also ==
- Paleorrota Geopark
- Paleontology
