= Santa Maria, Rio Grande do Sul =

Municipality in the state of Rio Grande do Sul, Brazil

Santa Maria
- Municipality
- Municipality of Santa Maria
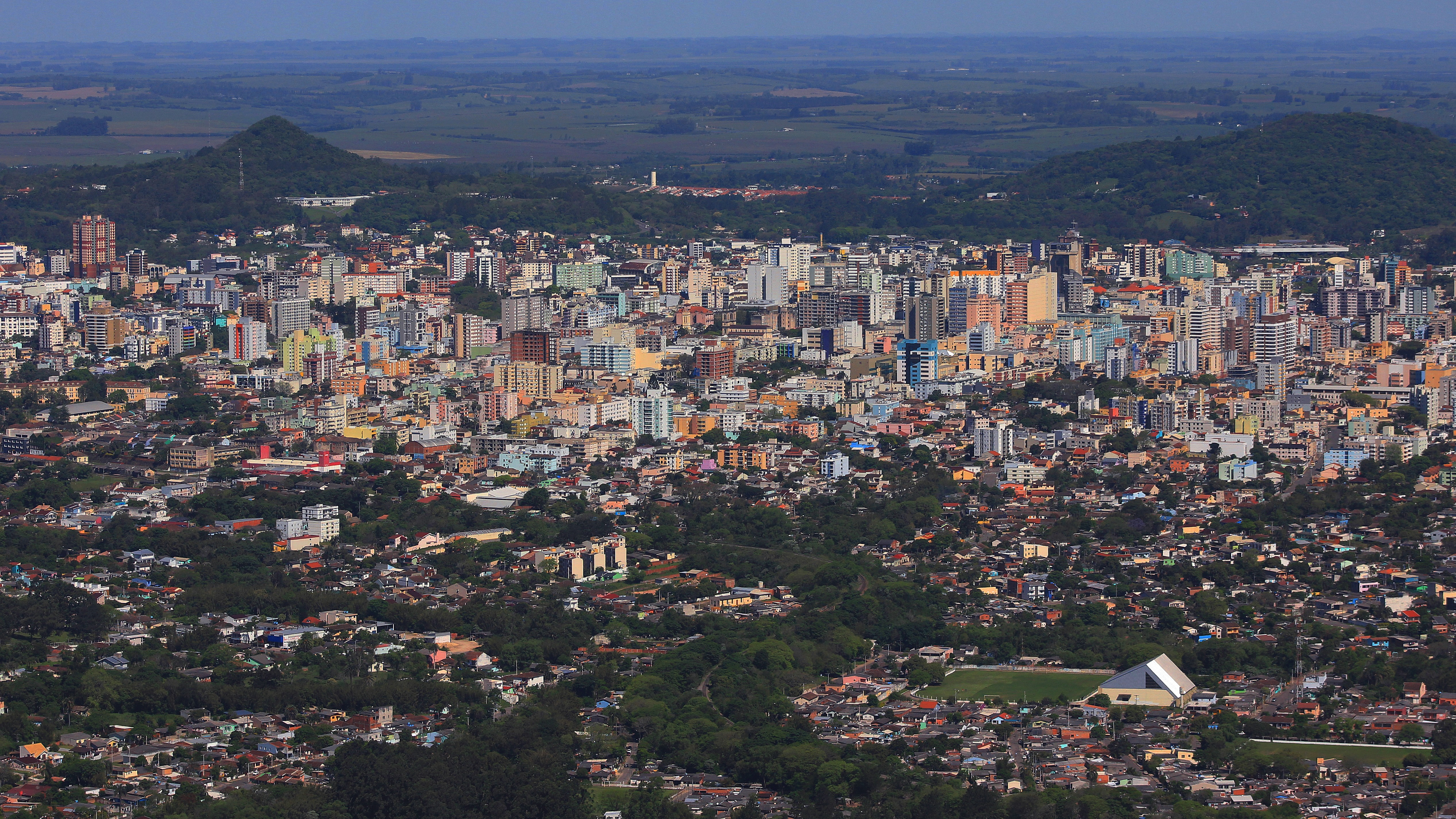
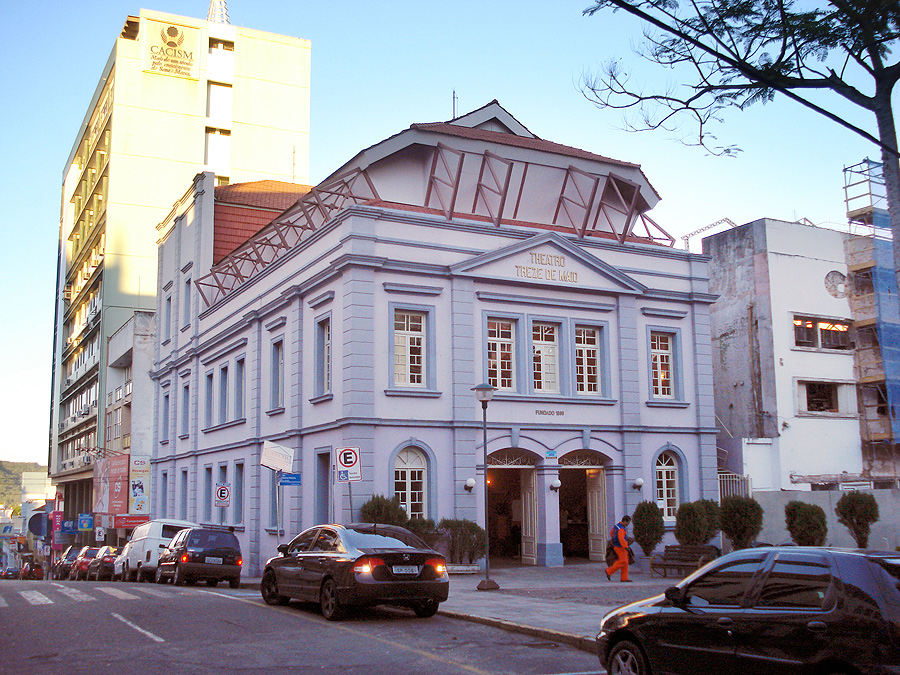
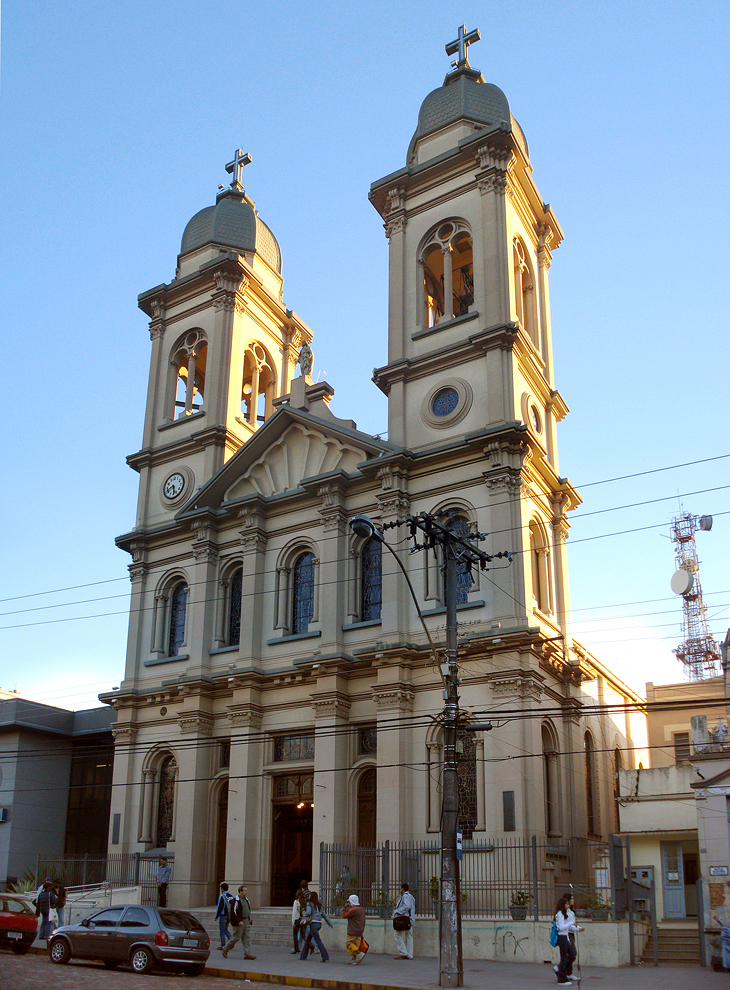
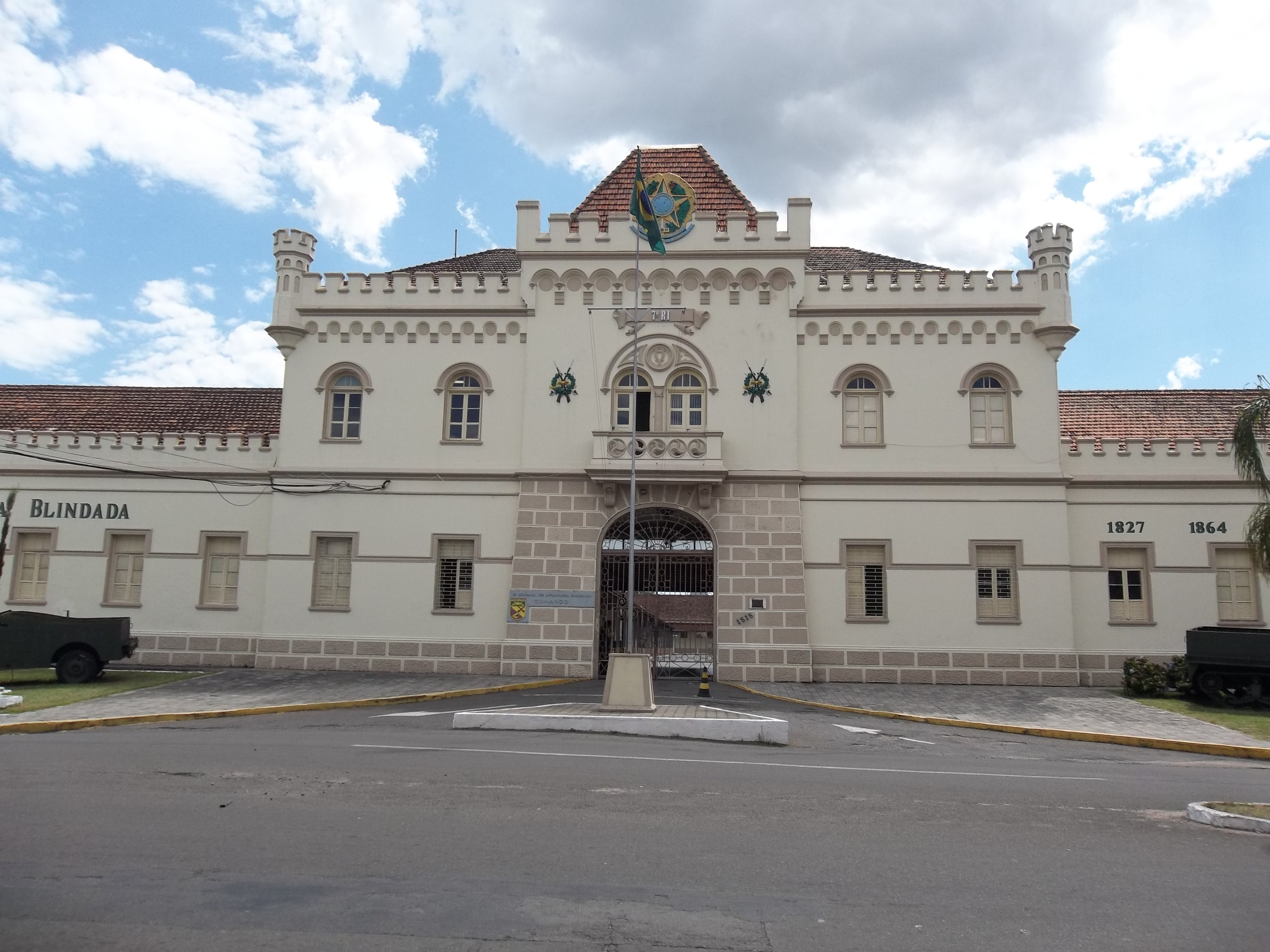
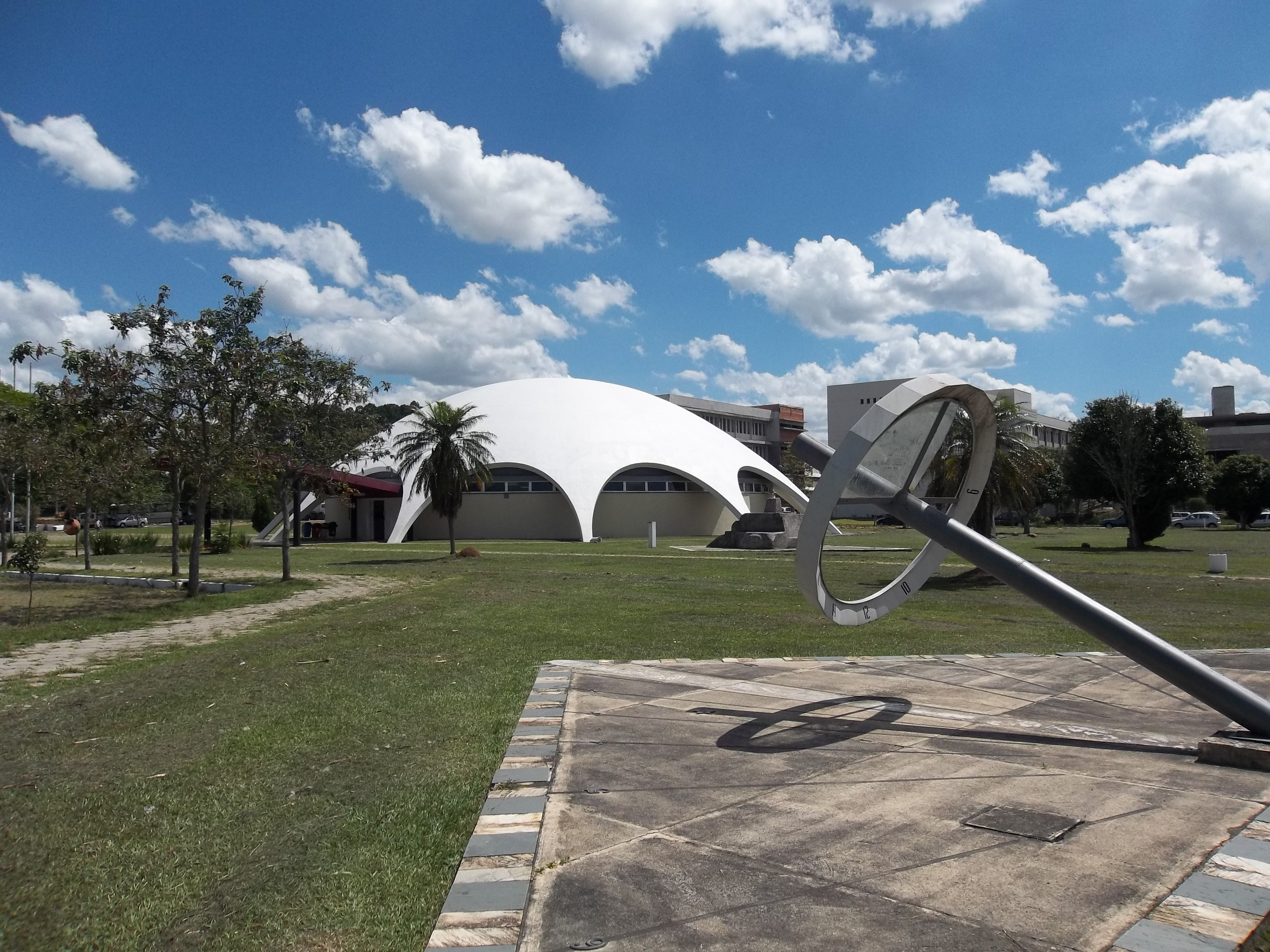
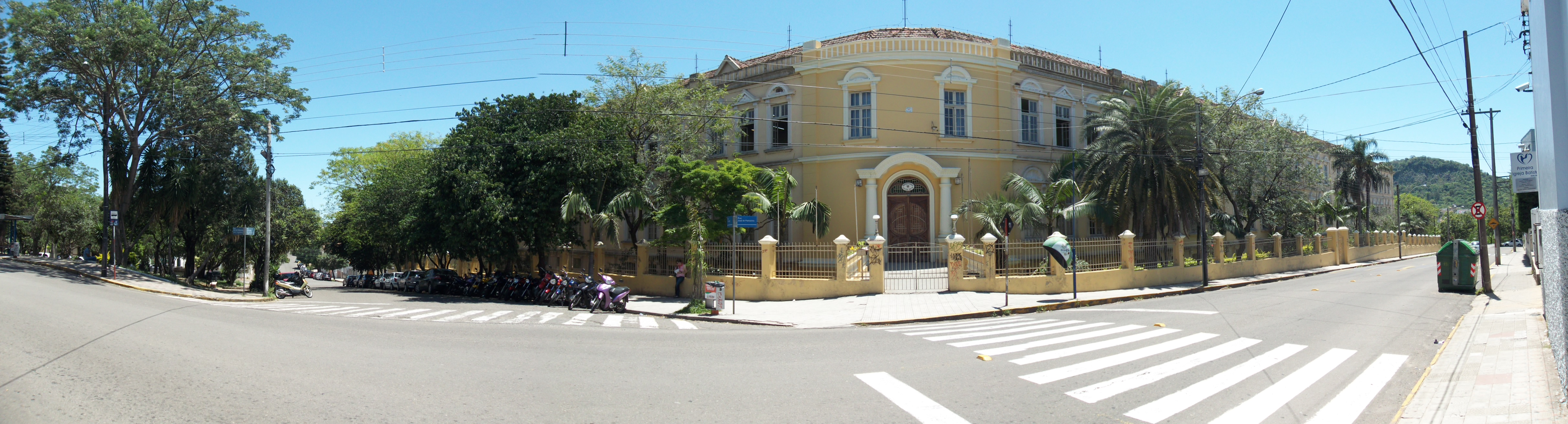
- From the top: Aerial view, May 13 Theatre, Cathedral, 6th Brigade, Solar clock of the UFSM and Manoel Rivas School.

- Flag Coat of arms

- Location in Rio Grande do Sul

- Location in Brazil
- Coordinates: 29°41′0″S 53°48′0″W
- Country: Brazil
- Region: South
- State: Rio Grande do Sul

Government
  - Mayor: Rodrigo Decimo (PSDB)

Area
  - Total: 1,823.1 km^{2} (703.9 sq mi)
- Elevation: 113 m (371 ft)

Population (2022 Brazilian census)
  - Total: 271,735
  - Estimate (2025): 282,395
  - Density: 149.05/km^{2} (386.04/sq mi)
- Time zone: UTC-3 (UTC-3)
- HDI (2010): 0.784 – high
- Website: www.santamaria.rs.gov.br

Santa Maria is a municipality (município) in the central region of Rio Grande do Sul, the southernmost state of Brazil. In 2025, its population was 282,395 inhabitants in a total area of 1,823 square kilometres (704 sq mi). Santa Maria is the 5th biggest municipality in the state, and the largest in its micro-region.

Santa Maria is often referred to as the "heart of Rio Grande" (from Portuguese: "Coração do Rio Grande"), because the city is located in the geographical center of the State.

Santa Maria is considered a university city, thanks to the Federal University of Santa Maria, created by José Mariano da Rocha Filho, and the Franciscan University, elevated to university center status on March 28, 2018.

In the early morning of January 27, 2013, a fire occurred at the Kiss nightclub. On that occasion, 242 people, mostly young people, died from smoke inhalation or being trampled, given that there was no emergency exit in the building.

== History and importance ==
The first inhabitants of Santa Maria were the Minuano Indigenous People, who lived in a region of the municipality known as Coxilha do Pau Fincado, and the Tapes, who lived in the hills.

With the arrival of Spanish and Portuguese colonizers this border region was witness to innumerable battles between rival groups. Finally, in 1797 the border between the two colonies was established by a commission (1ª Subdivisão da Comissão Demarcadora de Limites da América dat lit Meridional). This commission set up camp on the site of present-day Santa Maria.

The camp was known as Acampamento de Santa Maria, later adding Boca do Monte to the name. 1828 saw the arrival of the 28th Battalion of Foreigners, made up of hired Germans to fight against the inhabitants of present-day Uruguay in the Cisplatine War. After the war many of the soldiers decided to stay in Santa Maria, beginning the cycle of German colonization. In 1857, Santa Maria was separated from Cachoeira do Sul and elevated to town (vila) status. The municipality was created on 16 December 1857 and installed on 17 May 1858.

=== Republican period ===
The city went through some turbulence during the republican period. During the 1893 Federalist Revolt, the city was taken by a battalion of revolutionaries, and during the 1923 revolution, Clarestino Bento attacked the barracks in the region, without success, and with the loss of 4 men and 7 injured, the last confrontation with deaths of the revolution. In 1926, soldiers from the 5th Horse Artillery Regiment and the 7th Infantry Regiment rebelled under the leadership of their lieutenants, firing cannons on the city and attacking the 1st Cavalry Regiment with around 700 men. The Military Brigade clashed with the rebels, which lasted about two days, which defeated the rebel forces. The day would become known in the city as "Bombing Day".

Since 1910, the city is the seat of the Roman Catholic Diocese of Santa Maria, and annually hosts an important Roman Catholic festival dedicated to Nossa Senhora Medianeira, called "Romaria da Medianeira" (Medianeira or Mediatrix is a name of Our Lady that was created in Venice, Italy). Every year, hundreds of thousands of people from all over Brazil join in the celebrations.

Due to its strategic geographical location, Santa Maria has a large military force, including the Santa Maria Air Force Base of the Brazilian Air Force, which houses four units, and the 3rd Army Division of the Southern Military Command. In 2011, the German defence company KraussMaffei closed a deal to renovate old tanks and produce new ones for the Brazilian Army, opening a factory in Santa Maria. This earned the city its new nickname, "Armoured Capital" (from Portuguese: Capital dos Blindados).

On 27 January 2013, a fire broke out in the ''Kiss" nightclub during a band performance, due to misuse of pyrotechnics, which got in direct contact with the acoustic foam used in the club. In total, 242 people died due to suffocation or trampling while trying to escape, or of complication in days and months following the event. It has been reported that as many as 1,500 people were in the nightclub when the fire broke out.

== Population ==
Santa Maria is the fifth largest city in the state of Rio Grande do Sul, after Porto Alegre, Caxias do Sul, Pelotas, and Canoas. Many of the city's inhabitants are of German and Italian ancestries.

It is the largest city in the central region of the state, concentrating 36.40% of this region's population. During the period between 2000 and 2010, Santa Maria had a demographic growth rate of 6.00%.

The municipality contains 10 districts. The city of Santa Maria itself is located in the urban Seat District (Distrito Sede), which is divided into 8 regiões administrativas (administrative regions), and further subdivided into 40 bairros (neighbourhoods). About 95% of the municipality's total population is concentrated in the Seat District. One of the districts is Palma.

== Economy ==
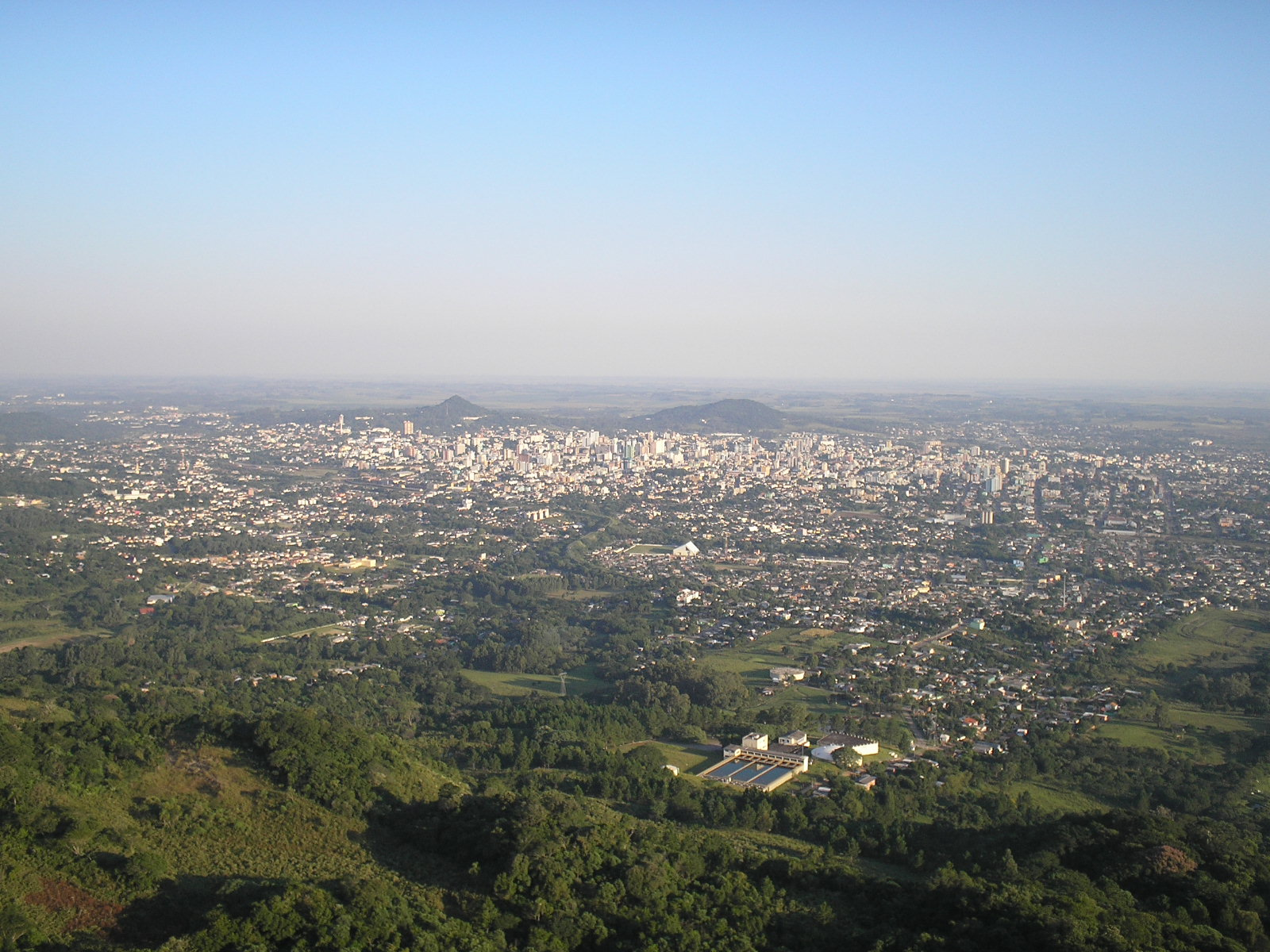
Santa Maria seen from Morro das Antenas Peak

The economy is based on services, industry, government services, and agriculture. In 2006, there were 934 transformation industries employing 6,344 workers. Commerce employed 12,180 workers, public administration employed 4,783 workers, the health sector employed 3,799 workers, and education employed 6,362 workers. In the agricultural sector, there were 2,335 establishments employing 7,000 workers. The main activities are cattle raising with over 100,000 head in 2006, and growth of rice, corn, soybean, and wheat.

== Transportation ==
Santa Maria is a major highway and railroad hub. The city has a strategic location in connecting Brazil to other Mercosul countries, mainly through the following highways:

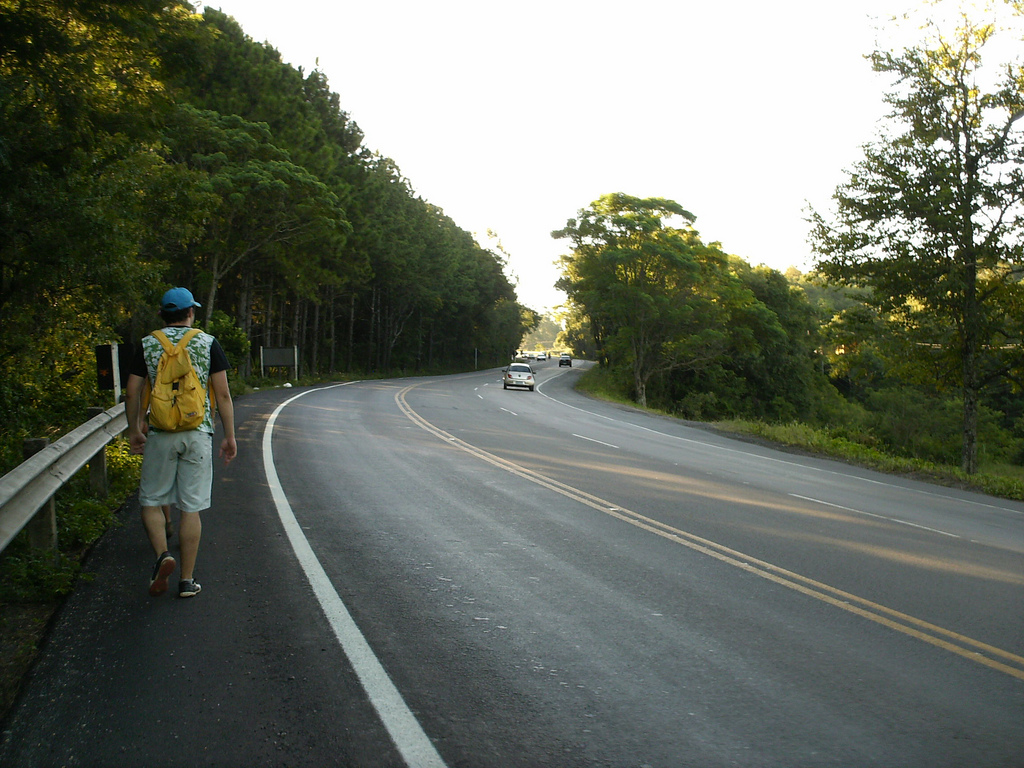
BR-158 highway in Santa Maria

- BR-158 – connects Santa Maria to northern and southwestern Rio Grande do Sul, allowing access to Uruguaiana, in the Argentine border, and to Rivera, Uruguay.
- BR-287 – east-west highway, connecting the city to the capital of the state, Porto Alegre.

Railways are used for cargo transportation, mainly of agricultural products, automobile parts and food.

Santa Maria is 110 kilometres (68 mi) away from the River Terminal of Cachoeira do Sul, which allows ship transport until the port of Porto Alegre through the Jacuí River, and from there to the Atlantic Ocean, through the Lagoa dos Patos.

Santa Maria Airport is located 12 km (7.5 mi) away from downtown, in the neighborhood of Camobi. It has capacity for large airplanes and offers daily flights to Porto Alegre, Santo Ângelo and Uruguaiana. Santa Maria Air Force Base - ALA4, one of their most important bases of the Brazilian Air Force, is located in Santa Maria and shares some facilities with the airport.

=== Distances to other cities ===
- Santa Maria—Porto Alegre: 286 km (178 mi).
- Santa Maria—Pelotas: 337 km (209 mi).
- Santa Maria—Cruz Alta: 135 km (84 mi).
- Santa Maria—Uruguaiana: 365 km (227 mi).
- Santa Maria—Passo Fundo: 293 km (182 mi).
- Santa Maria—Caxias do Sul: 307 km (191 mi).

== Education ==
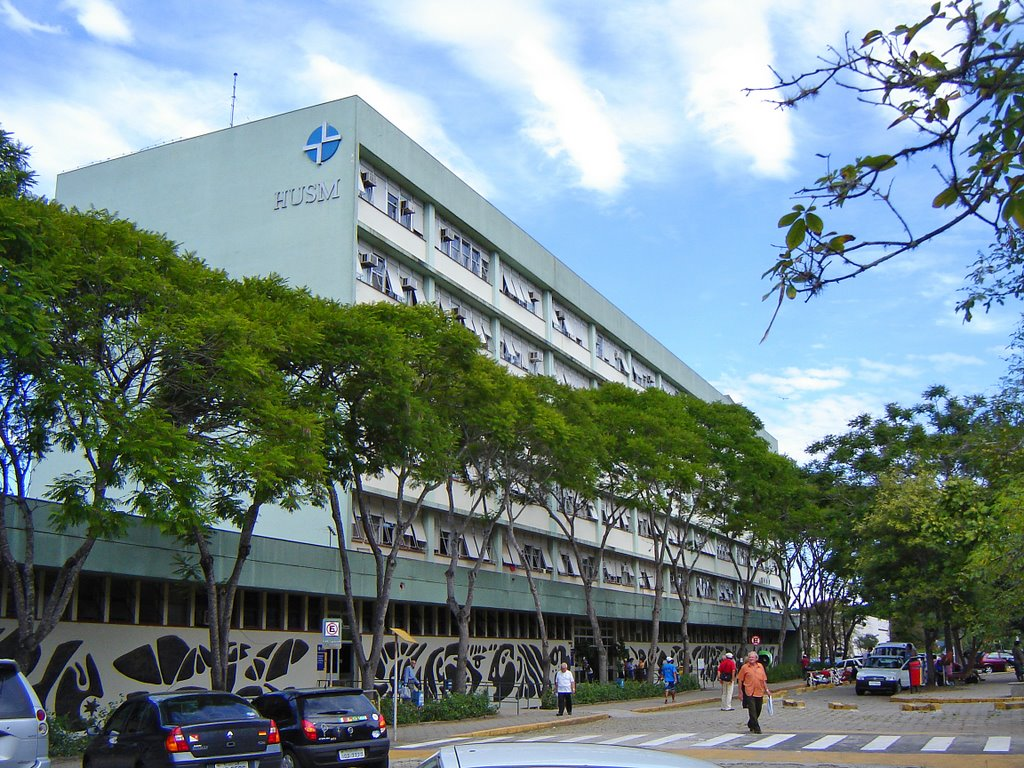
Federal University of Santa Maria Hospital

A popular nickname for Santa Maria is "University City" (Portuguese: "Cidade Universitária") or "Culture city" (Portuguese: "Cidade Cultura"), due to its large student population. The largest university, the Federal University of Santa Maria, was founded in 1960 by José Mariano da Rocha Filho; while the private university center Universidade Franciscana was founded in 1951. The city also has a number of other smaller private colleges, such as the Methodist University of Santa Maria (FAMES).

== Geography ==
=== Climate ===
Santa Maria has a humid subtropical climate and its annual average temperature is 18.9 °C (66.0 °F). In January, the warmest month, highs frequently surpass 30 °C (86 °F) with the average low dropping to 19 °C (66 °F). In June, the coldest month, highs reach 19 °C (66 °F) and lows usually go below 9 °C (48 °F), reaching up to −5 °C (23 °F), but snow is a rare occurrence. Rainfall is distributed evenly throughout the year with a monthly average of 140 millimetres (5.5 in).

Climate data for Santa Maria, Rio Grande do Sul (1991–2020)
Month	Jan	Feb	Mar	Apr	May	Jun	Jul	Aug	Sep	Oct	Nov	Dec	Year
Record high °C (°F)	39.3 (102.7)	40.0 (104.0)	37.2 (99.0)	35.0 (95.0)	32.4 (90.3)	30.9 (87.6)	30.7 (87.3)	33.3 (91.9)	35.4 (95.7)	35.5 (95.9)	40.0 (104.0)	38.3 (100.9)	40.0 (104.0)
Mean daily maximum °C (°F)	31.0 (87.8)	30.2 (86.4)	29.1 (84.4)	26.0 (78.8)	22.0 (71.6)	19.8 (67.6)	19.2 (66.6)	21.8 (71.2)	22.5 (72.5)	25.3 (77.5)	28.0 (82.4)	30.4 (86.7)	25.4 (77.7)
Daily mean °C (°F)	25.0 (77.0)	24.2 (75.6)	22.8 (73.0)	19.6 (67.3)	16.0 (60.8)	14.2 (57.6)	13.5 (56.3)	15.4 (59.7)	16.7 (62.1)	19.5 (67.1)	21.8 (71.2)	24.2 (75.6)	19.4 (66.9)
Mean daily minimum °C (°F)	20.1 (68.2)	19.7 (67.5)	18.3 (64.9)	15.2 (59.4)	12.1 (53.8)	10.4 (50.7)	9.4 (48.9)	10.8 (51.4)	12.3 (54.1)	15.0 (59.0)	16.5 (61.7)	18.7 (65.7)	14.9 (58.8)
Record low °C (°F)	11.4 (52.5)	10.4 (50.7)	5.9 (42.6)	3.0 (37.4)	0.1 (32.2)	−2.6 (27.3)	−2.2 (28.0)	−0.6 (30.9)	0.2 (32.4)	3.6 (38.5)	5.8 (42.4)	7.2 (45.0)	−2.6 (27.3)
Average precipitation mm (inches)	166.1 (6.54)	131.7 (5.19)	142.0 (5.59)	151.1 (5.95)	136.6 (5.38)	132.7 (5.22)	147.3 (5.80)	114.4 (4.50)	155.3 (6.11)	203.2 (8.00)	136.0 (5.35)	161.5 (6.36)	1,777.9 (70.00)
Average precipitation days (≥ 1.0 mm)	10	9	8	8	8	8	9	8	9	10	7	8	102
Average relative humidity (%)	73.8	77.3	78.9	81.4	84.3	84.1	82.5	79.0	79.1	76.7	70.5	69.8	78.1
Mean monthly sunshine hours	242.6	205.8	212.6	179.4	155.8	126.8	146.5	166.0	158.5	181.0	224.5	249.9	2,249.4
Source: Instituto Nacional de Meteorologia

== Quality of life ==
According to the United Nations (PNUD 2000), Santa Maria ranks 45th in quality of life in Brazil and 9th in the state. According to data from 2006, from Fundação de Economia e Estatística – FEE, life expectancy at birth is of 74.01 years and the demographic density of the municipality is 145.4 inhabitants per square kilometre (377/sq mi).

The level of atmospheric pollution in Santa Maria is low, since the urban area, for the most part, is composed of retail commerce and services, without polluting sectors.

== Sport ==
Santa Maria has two football teams, Inter-SM and Riograndense-SM, one American football team, the Santa Maria Soldiers and one Rugby team, the Universitario Rugby.

== Paleontology ==
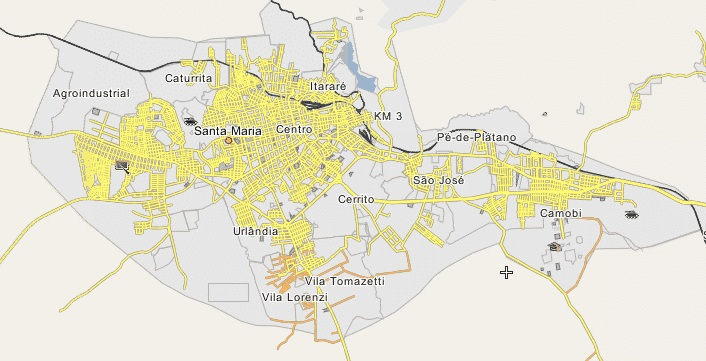
Paleontological Sites of Santa Maria:
- 1) Arroio Cancela
- 2) Cabeceira do Raimundo
- 3) Arroio Passo das Tropas
- 4) Olaria Campus UFSM
- 5) Colégio Militar
- 6) Largo Padre Cargnin
- 7) Cerrito I
- 8) Cerrito II
- 9) Cerrito III
- 10) Sanga of Alemoa
- 11) Jazigo 5
- 12) Sanga do Armário
- 13) Vila dos Sargentos
- 14) Cidade dos Meninos
- 15) Vila Kennedy
- 16) Vila Caturrita
- 17) Bela Vista
- 18) Jardim Berleze
- 19) Esc. Xavier da Rocha
- 20) Silva Jardim

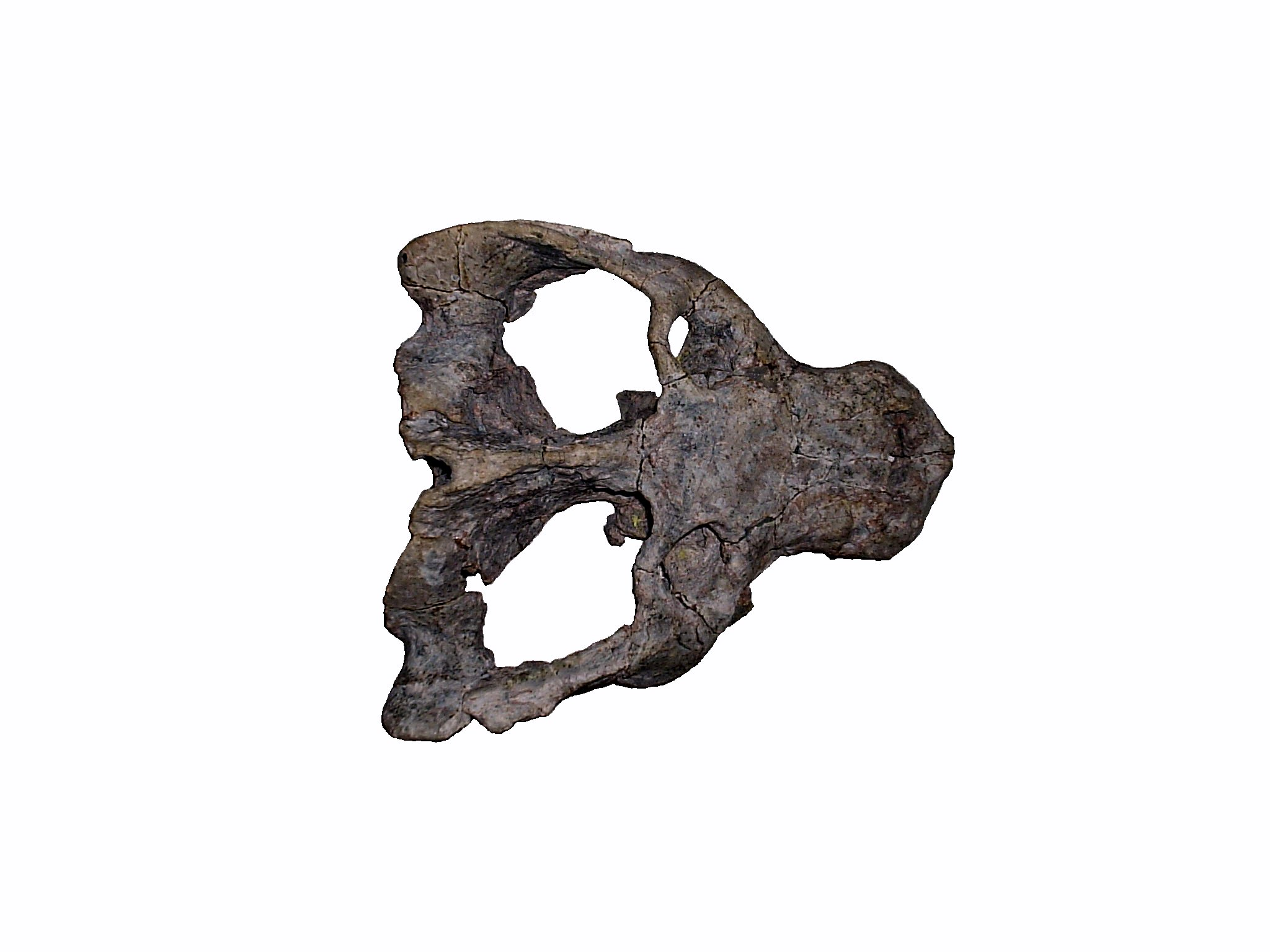
Exaeretodon collected in this city

The city is the birthplace of paleontology in Rio Grande do Sul and Brazil. The Paleontological Sites of Santa Maria are internationally known. In 1902, a Rhynchosaur was collected in Santa Maria, one of the first fossil collections made in South America since Darwin's voyage on the Beagle between 1831 and 1836. Llewellyn Ivor Price, a Santa Maria-born paleontologist and one of the first Brazilian ones, collected a Staurikosaurus, the first Brazilian dinosaur. The city is located on a huge deposit of fossils, with more than 20 Paleontological Sites.

In October 2009, free distribution of one thousand copies of the book Vertebrados Fósseis de Santa Maria e Região (Vertebrate Fossils of Santa Maria and surrounding regions in English). The book will be delivered to institutions, schools and libraries in Santa Maria, in order to spread the teaching of this subject in the region. The book was published by the council of the city.

Already published two comic books with titles Xiru Lautério e Os Dinossauros I and II, in order to disclose the paleontology and gaucho culture among children of city and region.

== Notable people ==
- Oreco, Brazilian football player
- Atílio Munari, Brazilian paleontologist
- Jonatan Lucca, Brazilian football player

== See also ==
- List of municipalities in Rio Grande do Sul
