= Protuberum =

Protuberum Temporal range: Middle Triassic

Scientific classification
- Kingdom: Animalia
- Phylum: Chordata
- Clade: Synapsida
- Clade: Therapsida
- Clade: Cynodontia
- Family: †Traversodontidae
- Subfamily: †Gomphodontosuchinae
- Genus: †Protuberum; Reichel et al., 2009

Species
- P. cabralense Reichel et al., 2009 (type)

Extinct genus of cynodonts

Protuberum was a traversodontid cynodontian from the Middle Triassic of Brazil known from a single species, P. cabralense. It is most notable for its thickened skull and ribs, vertebrae and illium covered in bony bumps from which it gets its name, and was among the largest triassic cynodonts.

== Discovery and naming ==
The first specimen of Protuberum was collected in 1977. It consists of several ribs and vertebrae. The second, collected in 1989, consists of a partial articulated skeleton and a skull with most of the dentition still present. Both were collected by Father Daniel Cargnin. Additional specimens were discovered including thoracic (chest) ribs, a proximal (close to the midline) fragment of a right cervical (neck) rib, an ulna (one of the two bones of the lower arm), and two humeri (lower arm bones). In 2009 they were described by a team consisting of Míriam Reichel and colleagues. The second specimen was made the holotype.

The genus name refers to the large amount of protuberances on the ribs and ilia (part of the hip), while the species name is in honor of the Municipality of Novo Cabrais, where the type specimen was collected.

== Description ==
Protuberum was a large traversodontid, with the holotype subadult specimen weighting about 60.35 kg (133.0 lb), and other, probably adult specimens being 40% larger.

=== Skull and teeth ===
The cranium was big, measuring about 20 cm (7.9 in) long, sporting a short and high parietal crest, 15 millimetres (0.59 in) long or only 7.5% or the skull's length. The preorbital bones, lambdoid crest and the skull roof are thick, making the skull overall very robust. This robustness along with the large size of the skeletal elements indicate that the holotype individual was probably a subadult.

On the upper jaw, Protuberum had four incisors, one canine, and postcanines on each side. The incisors are large and point slightly forward, and have a thick coat of enamel on the labial surface (= the side touching the lips), with the largest being the third incisor. The canines are not preserved, with only a single scrap of a tooth remaining, although the fourth incisor was originally misinterpreted as a canine. The paracanine fossa (a depression on the upper jaw to accommodate the canines of the mandible when the mouth is closed) is larger than that of other traversodontids, and was originally interpreted a being so extensive it would create a uniquely long diastema (gap) between the canine and postcanine teeth, although this was later rejected. The postcanine teeth possess two cusps connected by a sharp transverse process. Unlike Massetognathus, Exaeretodon and some other gomphodonts, they lack a shouldering pattern. They are worn sequentially from the front of the mouth back, indicating that the postcanines erupted from the back of the mouth over time. However they likely did not move as new teeth grew, as indicated by a straight root.

=== Postcranial skeleton ===
Protuberum is most striking for its neural spines, presacral ribs and illium which are covered in bumps. Analogous rib ornaments are found in the ankylosaur Spicomellus and the pseudosuchian Euscolosuchus, although in the former they are epidermal. Thrinaxodon had a similar condition with a series of tubercules on the proximal ribs. Kayentatherium was another cynodont with bump-like vertebral processes. On the illium they are present on the iliac blade, above the hips, and are aligned with the bumps of the ribs. These bumps are made of compact bone tissue, possibly pachyostotic, and were most likely not covered in cartilaginous tissue.

Like with other cynodonts, the ribcage can be separated into two distinct regions, thoracic and lumbar, based on the presence of costal plates. The thoracic region bears overlapping costal plates, where the proximal half of each rib is widened. Each rib is lined with a single row of bumps, which decrease in size distally (away from the midline), so that the largest are near the spine. The longest middle thoracic ribs bear up to eight of these processes, and their number generally decreases with the length of the rib.

== Classification ==
In the first phylogeny ran in 2009, Protuberum was recovered deeply nested within Gomphodontosuchinae

- Diademodon
- Trirachodon
- - - Andescynodon
    - Pascualgnathus
  - - - - - Massetognathus
          - - - Exaeretodon
              - Scalenodontoides
              - - Menadon
                - Protuberum
            - Gomphodontosuchus
        - - Dadadon
          - Santacruzodon
      - Traversodon
    - Luangwa
    - Scalenodon hirschsoni
  - Scalenodon angustifrons

In 2024 Protuberum was recovered as outside Gomphodontosuchinae:

- Thrinaxodon liorhinus
- Cynognathia
  - Cynognathus crateronotus
  - Gomphodontia
    - Diademodontidae
      - Titanogomphodon crassus
      - Diademodon tetragonus
    - Neogomphodontia
      - Langbergia modisei
      - - - Trirachodon berryi
          - Sinognathinae
            - Cricodon metabolus
            - - Beishanodon youngi
              - Sinognathus gracilis
        - Traversodontidae
          - BP_1_5538
          - - CGP_100
            - - Etjoia dentitransitus
              - - - Scalenodon ribeiroae
                  - Scalenodon angustifrons
                - - Pascualgnathus polanskii
                  - - Andescynodon mendozensis
                    - - - Rosieria delsatei
                        - - Habayia halbadieri
                          - Microscalenodon nanus
                      - - - Mandagomphodon attridgei
                          - Mandagomphodon hirschoni
                        - - - Luangwa sudamericana
                            - Luangwa drysdalii
                          - - - Paratraversodon fransiscaensis
                              - Traversodon staleckeri
                            - - Protuberum carabalense
                              - - - Gomphodontosuchinae
                                    - Gomphodontosuchus brasiliensis
                                    - - Menadon Brazil
                                      - Menadon Madagascar
                                    - - Proexaeretodon vincei
                                      - - Siriusgnathus niemeyerorum
                                        - - Santagnathus mariensis
                                          - - Exaeretodon riograndensis
                                            - - Exaeretodon argentinus
                                              - Scalenodontoides macrodontes
                                  - - Massetognathinae
                                      - - Massetognathus ochagaviae
                                        - Massetognathus pascuali
                                      - - Santacruzodon hopsoni
                                        - Dadadon isaloi
                                    - Arctotraversodontinae
                                      - Maubeugia lotharingica
                                      - Arctotraversodon plemmyridon
                                      - Plinthogomphodon herpetairus
                                      - Boreogomphodon jeffersoni
                                      - Nanogomphodon wildi

== Paleobiology ==
The anterior (front) portion of the iliac blade is strongly curved, giving more surface for muscle attachment and indicating that strong hindlimb muscles would have been present in life. This is suggests the presence of powerful hindlimbs and may point toward burrowing habits. This is also supported by the high cortical thickness of the ribs, which is characteristic of aquatic or burrowing mammals. As is typical for traversodontids, protuberum was a specialized herbivore with teeth adapted for grinding vegetation, and may have used its powerful limbs to dig out roots. While the use of the bumps is not clear, these alongside the thickened skull and costal plates have been suggested to be defensive or burrowing adaptations.

Like other therapsids, Protuberum experienced a very rapid growth in its first years of life. One of the specimens was an adult or close to skeletal maturity based on the thick skull and wide patches of peripheral lamellar bone in the ulna, and shows continuous growth until maturity like other non-mammalian cynodonts.

== Paleoecology ==
Protuberum was found in the lower Dinodontosaurus Assemblage Zone of the Santa Maria Formation of Brazi, in the 'Sítio Cortado' an 'Rincão do Pinhal' outcrops. It would have lived alongside the traversodontids Exaertodon, Luangwa, Massetognathus, Scalenodon, and Traversodon, the probainognathians Aleodon, Bonacynodon, Candeariodon, Chiniquodon, and Protheriodon, the kannemeyeriiform dicynodonts Dinodontosaurus and Stahleckeria, the rhynchosaur Brasinorhynchus, the proterchampsiids Retymaijychampsa and Pinheirochampsa, the pseudosuchians Archeopelta, Decuriasuchus, Dynamosuchus, Pagosvenator, Parvosuchus, Prestosuchus, Procerosuchus, and Schultzsuchus, the silesaurids Gamatavus and Gondwanax, the aphanosaur Spondylosoma, and the owenetiid procolophonoid Candelaria

In the Triassic, the Santa Maria Formation would have been a arid to semi-arid environment, with long dry seasons and shorter wet seasons, comprising ephemeral lakes. The Dinodontosaurus Assemblage Zone represented a mudflat, and would have been wetter than later environments.
