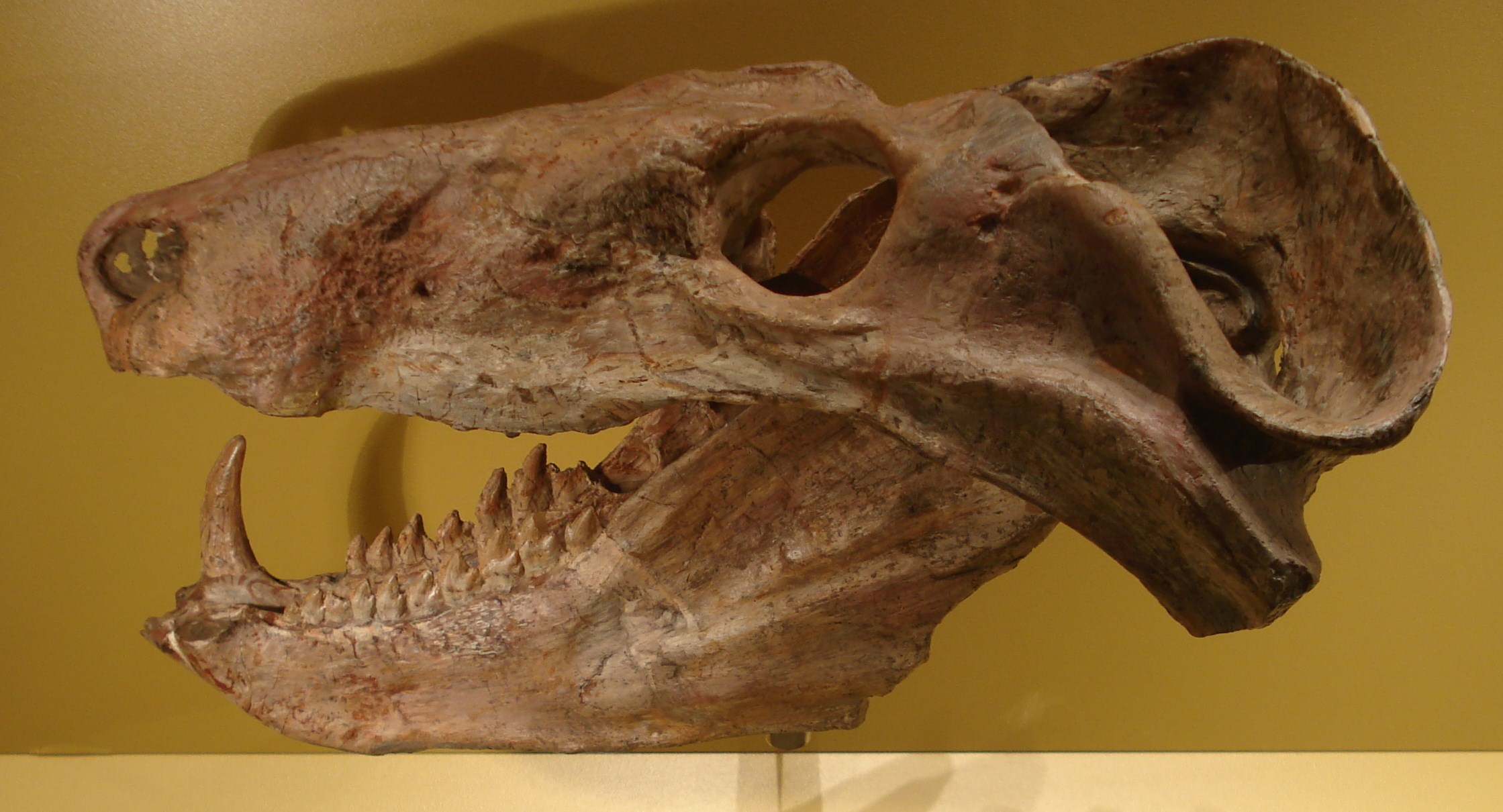
- Skull of the carnivorous cynognathian Cynognathus crateronotus
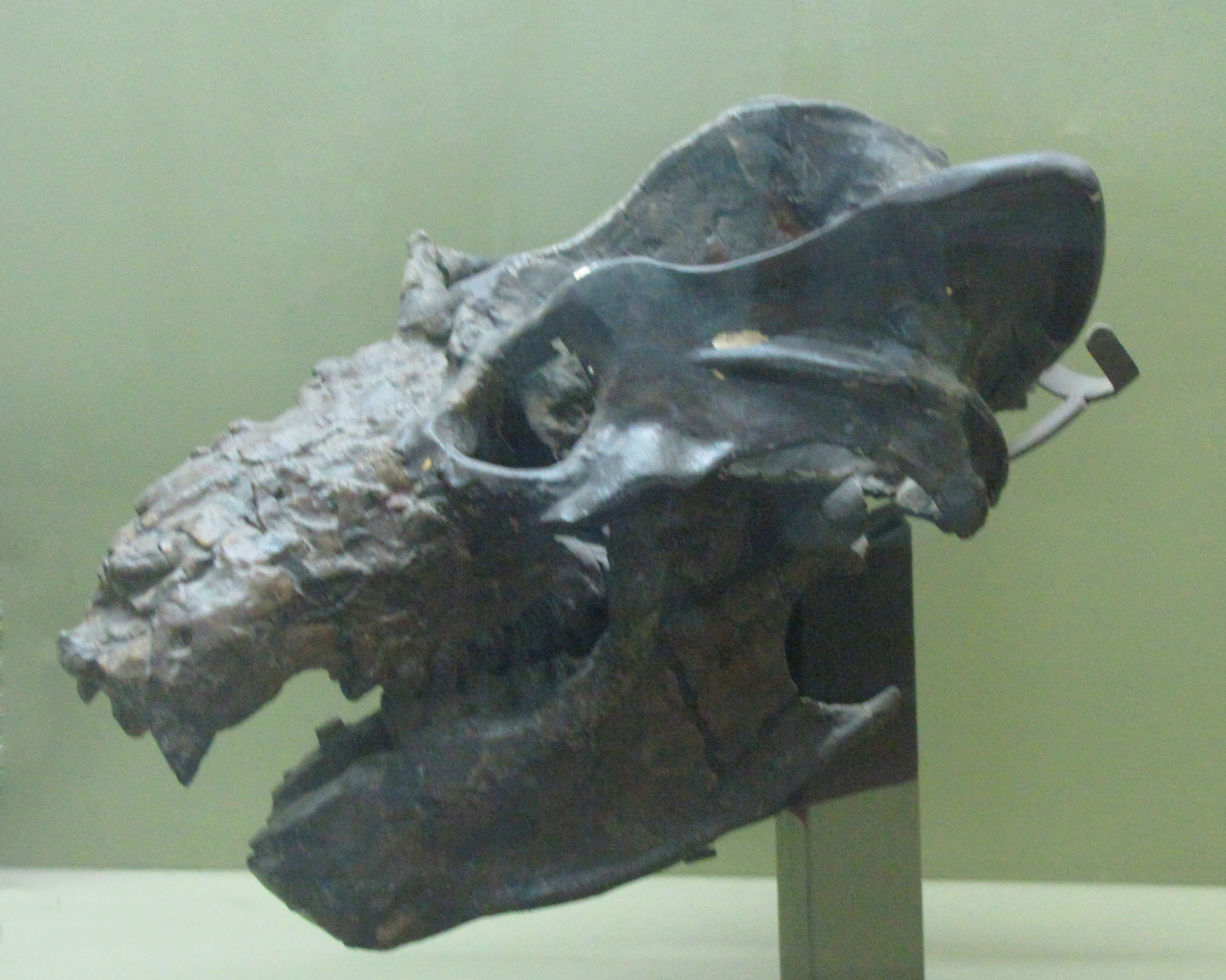
- Skull of Exaeretodon a herbivorous traversodontid

Scientific classification
- Kingdom: Animalia
- Phylum: Chordata
- Clade: Synapsida
- Clade: Therapsida
- Clade: Cynodontia
- Clade: Eucynodontia
- Clade: †Cynognathia; Hopson and Barghusen, 1986

Subgroups
- †Cynognathus; †Gomphodontia; †Diademodontidae; †Neogomphodontia Hendrickx et al., 2020; †Trirachodontidae; †Traversodontidae

= Cynognathia =

Cynognathians Temporal range: Early to Late Triassic, 251–208.5 Ma

Clade of cynodonts

Cynognathia ("dog jaw") is one of two major clades of cynodonts, the other being Probainognathia. Cynognathians included the large carnivorous genus Cynognathus and the herbivorous or omnivorous gomphodonts such as traversodontids. Cynognathians can be identified by several synapomorphies including a very deep zygomatic arch that extends above the middle of the orbit.

Cynognathian fossils are currently known from Africa, Antarctica, Asia, Europe, North America and South America.

== Taxonomy ==
- Suborder Cynodontia
  - Infraorder Eucynodontia
    - (unranked) Cynognathia
      - Family Cynognathidae
        - Cynognathus
      - (unranked) Gomphodontia
        - Family Diademodontidae
          - Diademodon
          - Titanogomphodon
        - (unranked) Neogomphodontia
          - Family Trirachodontidae
            - Subfamily Trirachodontinae
              - Langbergia
              - Trirachodon
            - Subfamily Sinognathinae
              - Beishanodon
              - Sinognathus
              - Cricodon
          - Family Traversodontidae
            - Etjoia
            - Nanogomphodon
            - Scalenodon
            - Subfamily Traversodontinae
              - Traversodon
              - Luangwa
            - Unnamed clade
              - Andescynodon
              - Pascualgnathus
              - Mandagomphodon
              - Subfamily Massetognathinae
                - Dadadon
                - Massetognathus
                - Santacruzodon
              - Subfamily Arctotraversodontinae
                - Arctotraversodon
                - Boreogomphodon
                - Plinthogomphodon
                - Habayia
                - Maubeugia
                - Microscalenodon
                - Mandagomphodon
                - Rosieria
              - Subfamily Gomphodontosuchinae
                - Gomphodontosuchus
                - Menadon
                - Protuberum
                - Ruberodon
                - Scalenodontoides
                - Exaeretodon
                - Siriusgnathus

=== Phylogeny ===
Cynognathians in a cladogram after Stefanello et al. (2023):

- Eucynodontia
  - Cynognathia
    - Cynognathus crateronotus
    - Gomphodontia
      - Diademodon tetragonus
      - - Langbergia modisei
        - - Trirachodon berryi
          - - Sinognathus gracilis
            - Traversodontidae
              - Pascualgnathus polanskii
              - Luangwa drysdalli
              - Scalenodon angustifrons
              - Mandagomphodon hirschoni
              - - Massetognathus pascuali
                - Exaeretodon argentinus
  - Probainognathia

== See also ==
- Evolution of mammals
