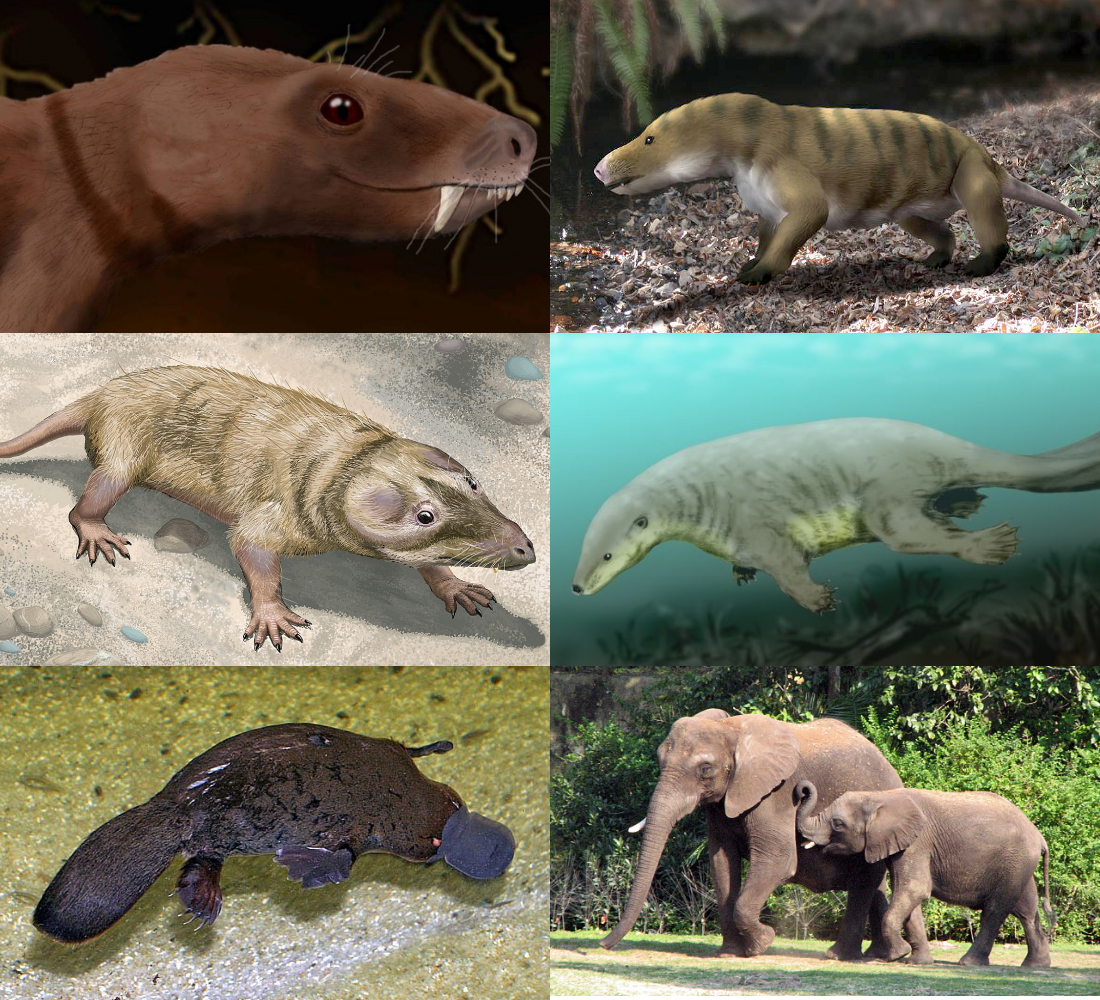
- Examples of eucynodonts. 1st row: Trirachodon berryi, Probainognathus jenseni; 2nd row: Brasilitherium riograndensis, Castorocauda lutrasimilis; 3rd row: Ornithorhynchus anatinus (platypus), Loxodonta africana (African bush elephant).

Scientific classification
- Domain: Eukaryota
- Kingdom: Animalia
- Phylum: Chordata
- Clade: Synapsida
- Clade: Therapsida
- Clade: Cynodontia
- Clade: Epicynodontia
- Clade: Eucynodontia; Kemp, 1982

Subgroups
- †Kataigidodon; †Cynognathia; Probainognathia

= Eucynodontia =

Eucynodonts Temporal range: Early Triassic-Holocene, 251–0 Ma

Clade of cynodonts

Eucynodontia ("true dog teeth") is a clade of cynodont therapsids including mammals and most non-mammalian cynodonts. The oldest eucynodonts are known from the Early Triassic and possibly Late Permian. Eucynodontia includes two major subgroups, Cynognathia and Probainognathia.

The clade was named in 1982 by Thomas Kemp, who defined it as all cynodonts more derived than Thrinaxodon.

In 2001, Hopson and Kitching redefined the clade Eucynodontia as the least inclusive group containing Mammalia and Exaeretodon.

== Phylogeny ==
Cladogram after Stefanello et al. (2023):

- Procynosuchus
- - Galesaurus
  - - Thrinaxodon
    - - Platycraniellus
      - Eucynodontia
        - Cynognathia
          - Cynognathus
          - Gomphodontia
            - Diademodon
            - - Langbergia
              - - Trirachodon
                - - Sinognathus
                  - Traversodontidae
                    - Pascualgnathus
                    - Luangwa
                    - Scalenodon
                    - Mandagomphodon
                    - - Massetognathus
                      - Exaeretodon
        - Probainognathia
          - Lumkuia
          - - Chiniquodon
            - Probainognathidae
              - Probainognathus
              - Bonacynodon
            - - Ecteniniidae
                - Trucidocynodon
                - - Ectenion (sic)
                  - Diegocanis
              - - Protheriodon
                - Prozostrodontia
                  - Prozostrodontidae
                    - Prozostrodon
                    - Pseudotherium
                  - - Therioherpeton
                    - - Irajatherium
                      - - Riograndia
                        - - - Diarthrognathus
                            - Pachygenelus
                          - - Tritylodontidae
                            - - Botucaraitherium
                              - - Brasilodon
                                - Mammaliaformes
