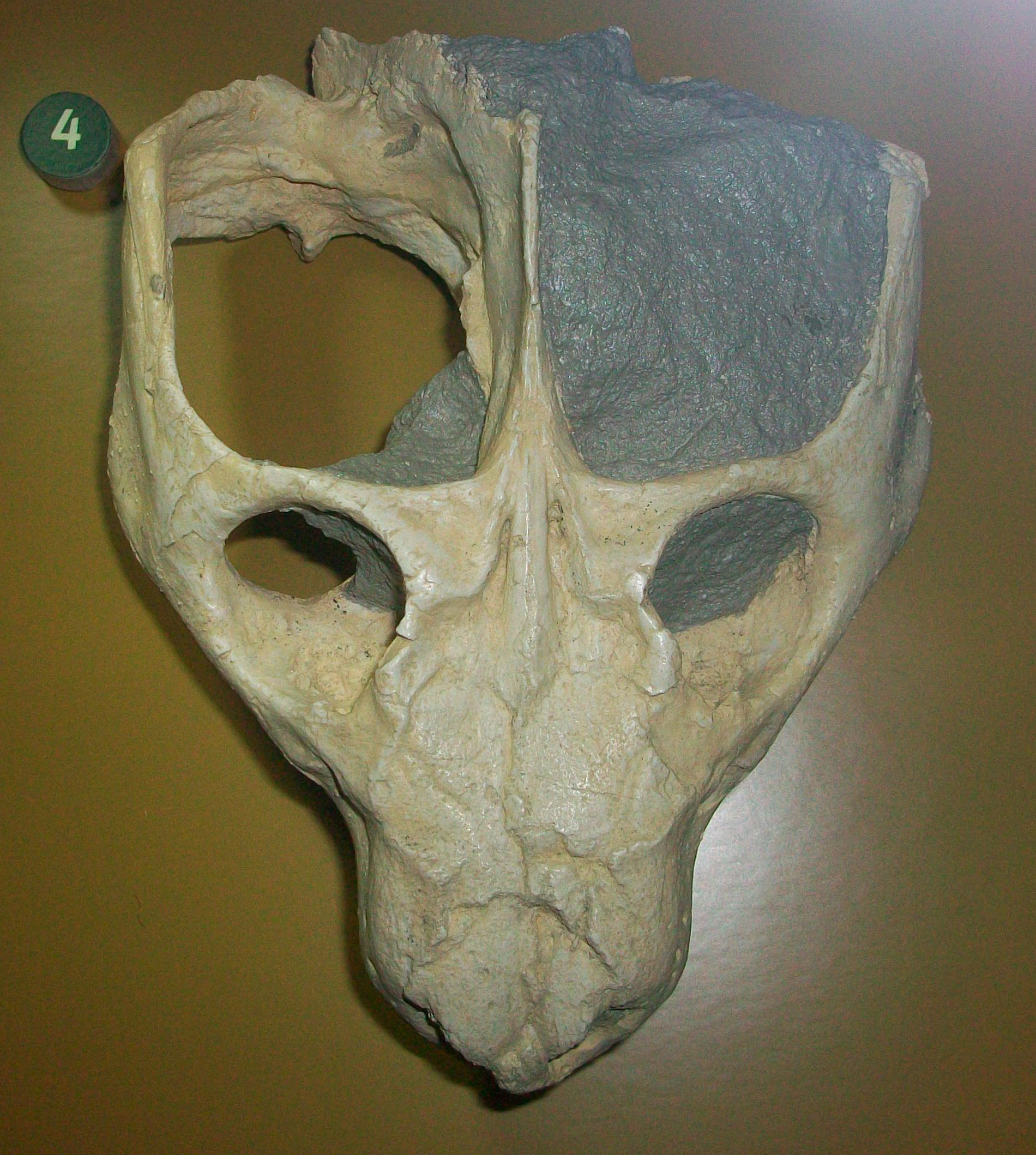
- Skull of the massetognathine Dadadon isaloi

Scientific classification
- Domain: Eukaryota
- Kingdom: Animalia
- Phylum: Chordata
- Clade: Synapsida
- Clade: Therapsida
- Clade: Cynodontia
- Family: †Traversodontidae
- Subfamily: †Massetognathinae; Kammerer et al., 2012

Genera
- See text

= Massetognathinae =

Massetognathinae Temporal range: Middle Triassic - Late Triassic

Subfamily of traversodontid cynodonts

Massetognathinae is an extinct subfamily of cynodonts in the family Traversodontidae. It includes four species from the Middle and Late Triassic: Massetognathus pascuali from Argentina, Massetognathus ochagaviae and Santacruzodon hopsoni from southern Brazil, and Dadadon isaloi from Madagascar. Massetognathines have several distinguishing characteristics, including flattened skulls, small canine teeth, and postcanine teeth with three cusps on their outer edges. Massetgognathinae was defined by Kammerer et al. (2012) as the clade containing all traversodontids more closely related to Massetognathus pascuali than to Gomphodontosuchus brasiliensis, and is the sister taxon of the traversodontid subfamily Gomphodontosuchinae, which was defined by Kammerer et al. (2008) as all traverodontids more closely related to G. brasiliensis than to M. pascuali.

Below is a cladogram from Kammerer et al. (2012) showing the phylogenetic position of Massetognathinae within Traversodontidae:

- Cynognathia
  - Cynognathus
  - Gomphodontia
    - Diademodon
    - - Trirachodontidae
        - Trirachodon
        - - Cricodon
          - Langbergia
      - Traversodontidae
        - - Andescynodon
          - Pascualgnathus
        - - - Arctotraversodon
            - - Boreogomphodon
              - Nanogomphodon
          - - Massetognathinae
              - Massetognathus
              - - Dadadon
                - Santacruzodon
            - Gomphodontosuchinae
              - Gomphodontosuchus
              - - Menadon
                - - Protuberum
                  - - Exaeretodon
                    - Scalenodontoides
