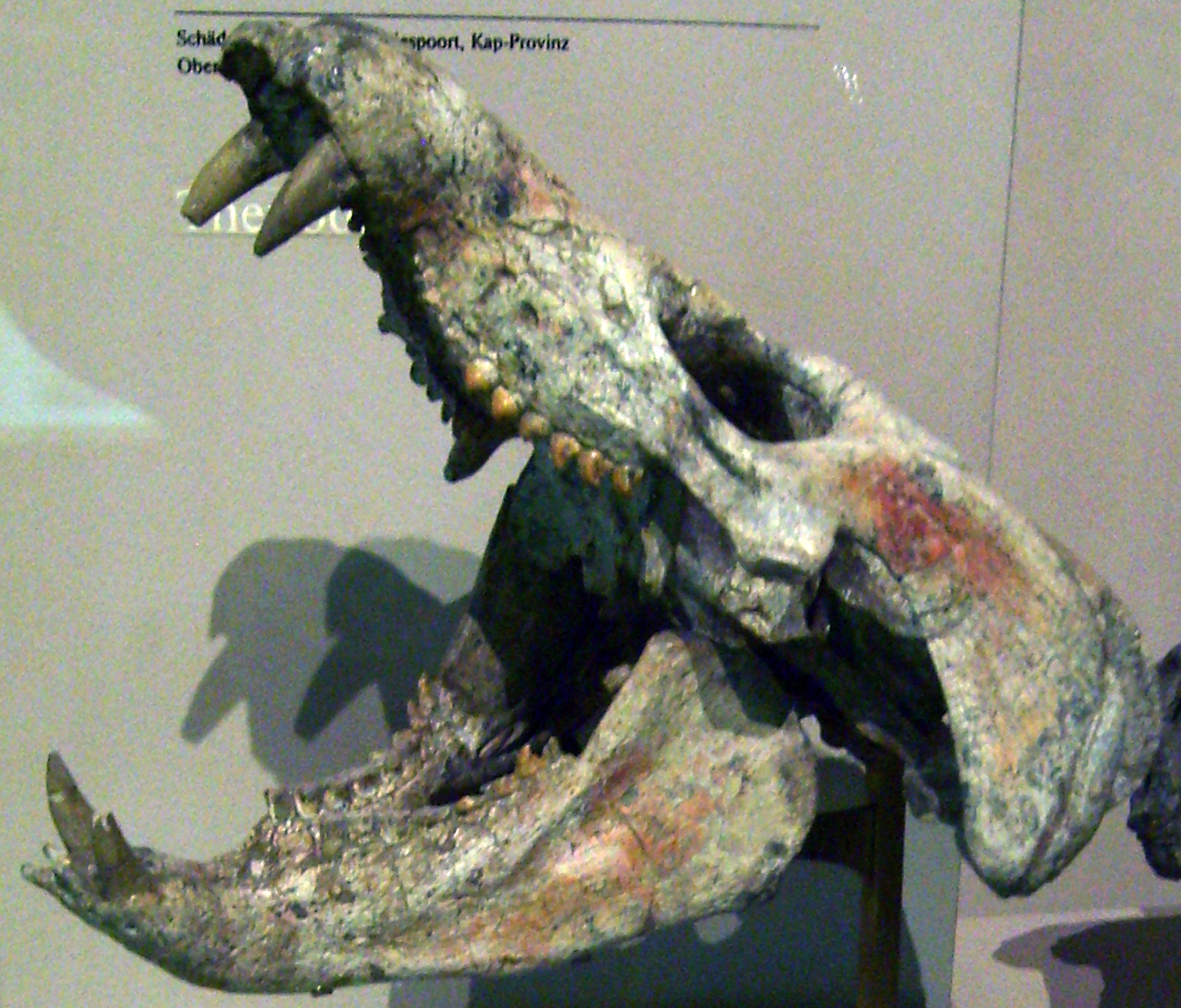
- Skull of the gomphodont Diademodon tetragonus

Scientific classification
- Kingdom: Animalia
- Phylum: Chordata
- Clade: Synapsida
- Clade: Therapsida
- Clade: Cynodontia
- Clade: †Cynognathia
- Clade: †Gomphodontia; Seeley, 1895

Subgroups
- †Diademodontidae; †Neogomphodontia Hendrickx et al., 2020; †Trirachodontidae; †Traversodontidae

= Gomphodontia =

Gomphodonts Temporal range: Early - Late Triassic, 251–201.3 Ma

Clade of cynodonts

Gomphodontia is a clade of cynognathian cynodonts that includes the families Diademodontidae, Trirachodontidae, and Traversodontidae. Gomphodonts are distinguished by wide and closely spaced molar-like postcanine teeth, which are convergent with those of mammals. Other distinguishing characteristics of gomphodonts include deep zygomatic arches, upper postcanines with three or more cusps spanning their widths and lower postcanines with two cusps spanning their widths. They are thought to have been herbivorous or omnivorous. Gomphodonts first appeared in the Early Triassic and became extinct at the end of the Late Triassic. Fossils are known from southern Africa, Argentina and southern Brazil (Paleorrota geopark), eastern North America, Europe, China, and Antarctica.

Gomphodontia was first named by paleontologist Harry Seeley in 1895. He considered it an order of wide-toothed therapsids (then called anomodonts) from South Africa, distinct from Cynodontia. By the 1930s Gomphodontia was considered a suborder of Cynodontia and included the families Diademodontidae, Trirachodontidae, Traversodontidae, and Tritylodontidae. These four families have also been grouped in the superfamily Traversodontoidea, named by paleontologist Edward Drinker Cope in 1884. Tritylodontoidea has occasionally replaced Gomphodontia in various cynodont taxonomies. In 2001 Gomphodontia was defined as a stem-based clade including all cynodonts more closely related to Exaeretodon than to Cynognathus. This placed it within the larger clade Cynognathia, one of the two main groups of eucynodonts (the other being Probainognathia). Since then most studies have removed Tritylodontidae from Gomphodontia and reclassified it within Probainognathia as a group more closely related to mammals than are the convergently similar gomphodonts. Tritylodontoidea has fallen into disuse while Gomphodontia continues to be used in many studies.

== Cladogram ==
Below is a cladogram from Ruta, Botha-Brink, Mitchell and Benton (2013) showing one hypothesis of gomphodont relationships:

- Cynognathia
  - Cynognathus
  - Gomphodontia
    - Diademodon
    - - Trirachodontidae
        - - Beishanodon
          - Sinognathus
        - - Trirachodon
          - - Cricodon
            - Langbergia
      - Traversodontidae
        - - Andescynodon
          - Pascualgnathus
        - - Scalenodon
          - - Luangwa
            - - Traversodon
              - - - "Scalenodon" attridgei
                  - - Mandagomphodon
                    - - Nanogomphodon
                      - - Arctotraversodon
                        - Boreogomphodon
                - - Massetognathinae
                    - Massetognathus
                    - - Dadadon
                      - Santacruzodon
                  - Gomphodontosuchinae
                    - Menadon
                    - - Gomphodontosuchus
                      - - Protuberum
                        - - Exaeretodon
                          - Scalenodontoides
