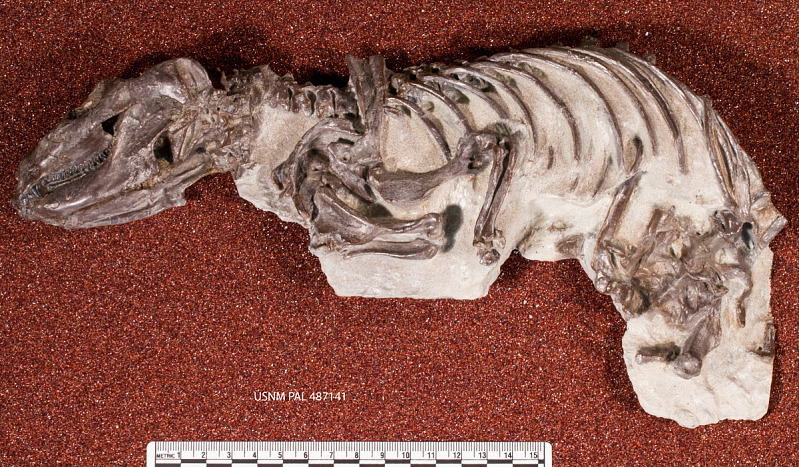
- Skeleton

Scientific classification
- Kingdom: Animalia
- Phylum: Chordata
- Clade: Synapsida
- Clade: Therapsida
- Clade: Cynodontia
- Family: †Traversodontidae
- Subfamily: †Massetognathinae
- Genus: †Massetognathus; Romer, 1967

Type species
- †Massetognathus pascuali Romer, 1967

Species
- †Massetognathus teruggi; †Massetognathus ochagaviae; †Massetognathus major

= Massetognathus =

Massetognathus Temporal range: early Late Triassic ~235.0–221.5 Ma

Extinct genus of cynodonts

Massetognathus (/ˌmæsɪˈtɒɡnəθəs/ MASS-ə-TOG-nə-thəss; Greek for "chewing muscle jaw") is an extinct genus of plant-eating traversodontid cynodonts. They lived during the Triassic Period about 235 million years ago, and are known from the Chañares Formation in Argentina and the Santa Maria Formation in Brazil.

== Description ==
Massetognathus species measured to about 46 centimeters (1.51 feet) in length with an estimated weight between 1 and 1.5 kilograms (2.2 and 3.3 lb). Massetognathus was the smaller, plant-eating equivalent of the better-known Cynognathus with incisors, fang-like canines and flat-topped molars covered by low ridges, an adaptation for grinding tough plant stems, roots, and other plant materials. It had a low and flattened skull indicating that the specimen had a relatively shorter and broader snout than larger specimens. It was a fox sized animal with claws on its feet and a long dog-like tail. Like most cynodonts, there is some evidence that they laid eggs, were warm blooded, as indicated by the detailed structure of the bones, and had a body covered by hair.

=== Skull ===
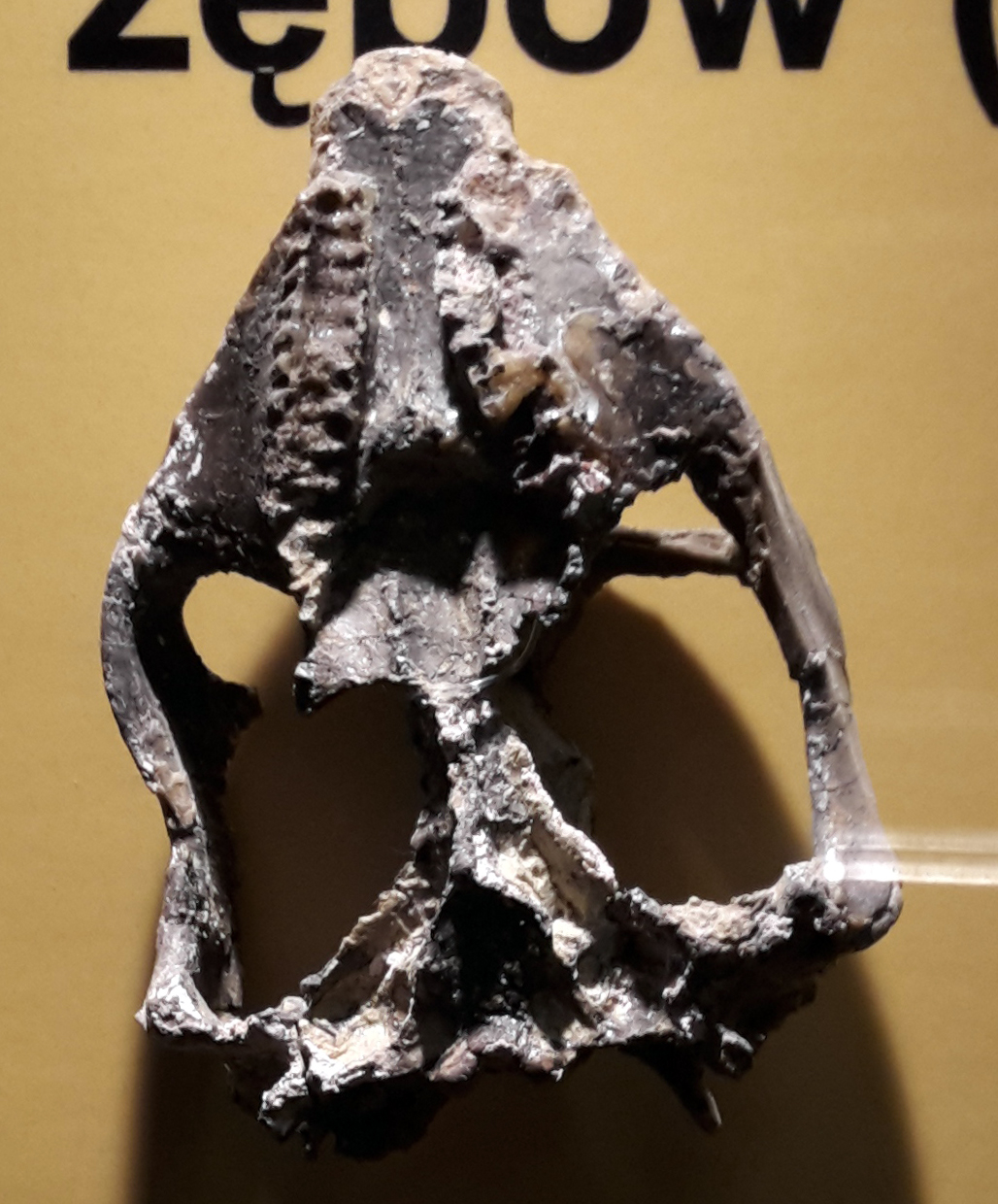
Skull cast seen from below, Museum of Evolution of Polish Academy of Sciences, Warsaw

Massetognathus was a medium-sized cynodont, which documents different ontogenetic stages. It had the largest size of any cynodont in the Chañares assemblage with an approximate skull length ranging from the smallest being 72 millimetres (2.8 in) to the largest 204 millimetres (8.0 in). The Middle Triassic Probainognathus and Massetognathus are the earliest non-mammalian cynodonts in the fossil record that show the initial steps of several phylogenetic transformations of the quadrate and can be characterized by several features: The rotation of the dorsal plate relative to the trochlea exhibits a progressively greater rotation more closely related to mammals, squamosal contact and medial expansion of the squamosal were crucial factors in the transforming the quadrate and the articulation of the cranium. The maxillae extend far out dorsally (with a downward slope) to a point about opposite the lower margins of the orbits, then curving downward and inward, present a broad ventral surface lateral to the tooth rows. The skull is low and the orbits face more dorsally than laterally with the nasals and frontals laying flat on top of the skull. In contrast to other cynodonts, the squamosal descends ventrally.

=== Postcranium ===
The humerus of M. ochagaviae had a rounded lesser tuberosity and a bulbous greater tuberosity. The ulnar condyle was also highly bulbous. The iliac blade was thin and had a spoon-shaped anterior portion and lanceolate posterior portion. The femur was characterised by a robust and protuberant greater trochanter, along with a bulbous, hemispherical and dorsomedially inclined femoral head. The femoral shaft is subrectangular in cross-section at the midpoint of the femur.

== Species ==
At least 4 different species of Massetognathus has been discovered so far.

The type species, M. pascuali, is the best-known species of the genus and is arguably considered to be the only valid species for Chañares gomphodonts while the others are considered junior synonyms. Named by Alfred Romer, the specific name is in honor of Dr. Rosendo Pascual, Professor of Paleontology in the Universidad de la Plata, who accompanied his expedition during his stay in Western Argentina.

M. teruggi is known to be the most common species of Chañares cynodonts. Named after the scientist and writer Dr. Mario Teruggi by Romer. M. teruggi skulls on average are approximately 45 percent larger than the skulls of M. pascuali and had a more defined sagittal crest. The dentary is less sharp and had 15 maxillaries compared to the 12 M. pascuali had.

M. ochagaviae is known to be the most common species from the Santa Maria Formation, Rio Grande do Sul, Brazil. Named after Mário Costa Barberena. It had a higher skull and mandible, slightly dorsally pointed dentary ventral border under the coronoid process, and less post canines compared to the other three species.

M. major is known for having the largest skull out of the 4 species that can reach up to 204 mm. It had a distinctively narrow snout with the teeth being less curved compared to its sister taxa. There is a complete loss of the parietal foramen. Megagomphodon oligodens may have been derived from this species.

== Discovery ==
In 1967, American paleontologist Alfred Romer named three new species under the genus: Massetognathus pascuali, M. teruggi, and M. major during his expedition in western Argentina. In 1981, Brazilian paleontologist Mário Costa Barberena named the fourth species, Massetognathus ochagaviae on the basis of a specimen from the Santa Maria Formation in Brazil. After the discovery of M. pascuali and M. teruggi, Romer first believed that these skulls were representing growth stages due to the larger size of M. teruggi. However, after collecting multiple skull samples, they clearly sorted into two size groups, rather than showing growth stages of a single species. The size difference is also considerably greater between the two than that expected in sex differences which gave Romer another reason to believe that they were dealing with two species of a single genus.

== Classification ==
Massetognathus is classified as a cynodont in the family Traversodontidae. The cladogram below shows the position of Massetognathus following the phylogenetic results of Pavanatto et al., 2016 in their description of postcranial remains assigned to M. ochagaviae.

- - Procynosuchus delaharpeae
  - - Galesaurus planiceps
    - - Thrinaxodon liorhinus
      - Eucynodontia
        - Platycraniellus elegans
        - - Probainognathia
          - Cynognathia
            - Cynognathus crateronotus
            - - Diademodon tetragonus
              - - Langbergia modisei
                - - Trirachodon berryi
                  - - Sinognathus gracilis
                    - Traversodontidae
                      - Pascualgnathus polanskii
                      - Luangwa drysdalli
                      - Scalenodon angustifrons
                      - Scalenodon hirschoni
                      - - Massetognathus pascuali
                        - Massetognathus ochagaviae
                      - - Exaeretodon argentinus
                        - Exaeretodon riograndensis

== Paleobiology ==
=== Diet ===
There are four upper and three lower triangular incisors of modest size with canines that are relatively less developed. There are two rows of cheek teeth that are close together and diverge posteriorly. A short diastema separates the cheek teeth and canines. There is no significant contrast between the premolars and molars. There are generally 12 maxillary teeth. It has been established that Massetognathus with multi-cuspate post canines adapted to herbivory, moved the lower jaw posteriorly and dorsally during the power stroke of the occlusion. Massetognathus is the only cynodont from the Chañares Formation with clear adaptations for herbivory, with basined, labiolingually expanded upper and lower post-canines, ensuring a rudimentary dental occlusion, feeding on ground level vegetation or on the lower branches of taller plants and shrubs.

=== Predation ===
Medium-sized predators likely fed preferably on juvenile Massetognathus and dicynodonts. Additionally, the slightly larger Chanaresuchus and Pseudolagosuchus also preyed on individual Massetognathus that were not fully grown. Luperosuchus and an unnamed paracrocodylomorph represent the top predators in the Chañares Formation. They preyed on all the other members in the fauna, including fully grown dicynodonts and Massetognathus. Considering the abundance of the herbivorous cynodont Massetognathus, it is clear that this taxon represents the main food resource in the Chañares assemblage. Only a few forms were capable of preying on fully grown Massetognathus; therefore, a high predation pressure on infant, juvenile and sub-adults is expected, and this, together with a high reproductive rate, may explain the overwhelming abundance of Massetognathus bones preserved.

== Paleoecology ==
Massetognathus faunas from the middle to upper Triassic is best documented in the Santa Maria Formation in Brazil and the Chañares Formation in western Argentina. Chañares fauna was dominated by herbivorous small to medium-sized taxa. In a trophic reconstruction of the environment, 55% of the specimens were herbivorous and 45% were faunivorous. All the herbivores are therapsids, and the most abundant by far is Massetognathus, representing 83.7% of all herbivorous specimens. One of the hallmarks of the Chañares assemblage is the numerical dominance of traversodontid cynodonts; with Massetognathus pascuali representing 62.3% of the cynodont sample and 46.0% of all amniote remains recovered. Additionally, the number of sectorial-toothed cynodonts is approximately half as abundant as Massetognathus in the fauna. Massetognathus records suggest a gregarious habit and have been reported to live in burrows with other specimens.

=== Chañares Formation ===
The Chañares Formation, where Romer first discovered Massetognathus crops out in the Ischigualasto-Villa Union Basin, which is formed along the western margin of South America during the breakup of Gondwana. Up to 4000 m of non-marine Triassic strata are preserved within the Ischigualasto-Villa Únion Basin. The Chañares Formation represented an extremely thick accumulation of volcanic tuffs that were deposited in wither eolian or lacustrine settings. The lack of stratification prompted Romer to further conclude that deposition in water was unlikely. Instead, Romer envisioned the Chañares landscape “with tremendous quantities of volcanic ash in Pompeii-like fashion”. The formation included deposits of muddy streams transporting abundant volcanic detritus. Ash-flow sheets potentially were emplaced as mass flows on sub alluvial surfaces and in lakes that occupied the Ischigualasto-Villa Únion Basin.

== Taphonomy ==
Tetrapod fossils have been found only in the lower lithologic unit of the Chañares Formation, where they are preserved almost exclusively within carbonate concretions. Fossilized bone preserved in concretion shows some of the best form of preservation, with dark brown bone surfaces exhibiting virtually no evidence of macroscopic weathering. The fossil accumulations of the Chañares assemblage are considered to be the product of two different taphonomic pathways: attritional accumulation associated with natural deaths of individuals by predation, disease and old age, and mass mortality of animals associated with volcanic events. In the mass mortality event, there is a clear bias towards preservation of individuals representing smaller-sized to mid-sized taxa such as Massetognathus. The mass mortality assemblage, with a large quantity of complete or partially articulated skeletons, shows some post-mortem sorting, followed by rapid burial that prevent the carcasses from being scavenged, crushed by species or exposed to weathering. In the lower lithologic unit of the Chañares Formation, the matrix that encompasses the fossils were in a copious amount of volcanic ash indicating the possibility that lethal volcanic processes led to the demise of the fauna. Volcanic reactions could have also led to the landscape flooding and damming of local rivers also resulting in volcanism being the cause of mass mortality in the Chañares Formation.

== Related genera ==
- Cynognathus
- Diademodon
- Trirachodon
