= Boreogomphodon =

Boreogomphodon Temporal range: Late Triassic

Scientific classification
- Kingdom: Animalia
- Phylum: Chordata
- Clade: Synapsida
- Clade: Therapsida
- Clade: Cynodontia
- Family: †Traversodontidae
- Subfamily: †Arctotraversodontinae
- Genus: †Boreogomphodon; Sues and Olsen, 1990

Species
- †B. jeffersoni Sues and Olsen, 1990 (type)

Extinct genus of cynodonts

Boreogomphodon is an extinct genus of traversodontid cynodonts from the Late Triassic of the eastern United States. Fossils have been found from the Turkey Branch Formation in Virginia and the Pekin Formation of North Carolina.

== Description and history ==
Boreogomphodon jeffersoni was named in 1990. Its teeth and cranial bones are the most common tetrapod fossils in the Turkey Branch Formation. Remain assigned to B. jeffersoni are also known from the Pekin Formation of North Carolina. Boreogomphodon was distinguished from other traversodontids like the African Luangwa and the South American Traversodon on the basis of its postcanine teeth. Most traversodontids have lower postcanine teeth with two cusps, but Boreogomphodon was the first traversodontid found with three cusps on its lower postcanine teeth. There is a single cusp on the side of the upper postcanine facing the lip, while a flat surface extends outward from it. The traversodontid Arctotraversodon from the Wolfville Formation of Nova Scotia is similar to Boreogomphodon in that it has three cusps on its lower postcanine, but its postcanines are much wider than they are long relative to those of Boreogomphodon.

Boreogomphodon specimens likely represent juvenile individuals because of their small size. The snout is short, while larger, presumably mature traversodonts have longer snouts. Boreogomphodon specimens have only four or five postcanine teeth. Traversodontids acquire more of these teeth as they grow, suggesting that Boreogomphodon individuals were not fully mature. Boreogomphodon also has some sectorial, or cutting, postcanine teeth, which are not present in most larger traversodontids.

Boreogomphodon has several primitive features, including a depression in the upper jaw called the paracanine fossa in front of the canine tooth. This fossa provides space for the lower canine tooth when the jaw is closed. Above the upper canine at the top of the snout there is a small depression on the maxilla. The tip of the snout is covered in irregular pits, a unique feature of Boreogomphodon. Each upper postcanine has large central cusp and a posterior cingulum.

== Classification ==
Boreogomphodon is closely related to Arctotraversodon and Nanogomphodon. The three North American traversodontids form a somewhat basal clade within Traversodontidae. Below is a cladogram modified from Sues and Hopson (2010) showing the phylogenetic relations of Boreogomphodon:

- Gomphodontia
  - Diademodontidae
  - - Trirachodontidae
    - Traversodontidae
      - - Andescynodon
        - Pascualgnathus
      - - "Scalenodon" hirschsoni
        - - Boreogomphodon
          - Arctotraversodon
          - Nanogomphodon
        - - - Scalenodon
            - Luangwa
          - - Traversodon
            - - Dadadon
              - - - Massetognathus
                  - Santacruzodon
                - - Gomphodontosuchus
                  - - Menadon
                    - - Exaeretodon
                      - Scalenodontoides
