= 1957 in paleontology =

List of years in paleontology	(table)
- … 1947; 1948; 1949; 1950; 1951; 1952; 1953; 1954; 1955; 1956; 1957; 1958; 1959; 1960; 1961; 1962; 1963; 1964; 1965; 1966; 1967 …
- In science 1954 1955 1956 1957 1958 1959 1960
- Art; Archaeology; Architecture; Literature; Music; Philosophy; Science; +...

Paleontology or palaeontology is the study of prehistoric life forms on Earth through the examination of plant and animal fossils. This includes the study of body fossils, tracks (ichnites), burrows, cast-off parts, fossilised feces (coprolites), palynomorphs and chemical residues. Because humans have encountered fossils for millennia, paleontology has a long history both before and after becoming formalized as a science. This article records significant discoveries and events related to paleontology that occurred or were published in the year 1957.

== Arthropoda ==
=== Crustaceans ===
Name	Novelty	Status	Authors	Age	Type locality	Location	Notes	Images
Enoplocytia tenuidigitata	Sp nov	Valid	Woods	Albian	Roma Formation	Australia	An erymid	
Glyphea oculata	Sp nov	Valid	Woods	Upper Albian	Tambo Formation	Australia	A glypheid	
Tillocheles	Gen et sp nov	Valid	Woods	Upper Albian	Tambo Formation	Australia	A stenochirid, type species is T. shannonae	

=== Insects ===
Name	Novelty	Status	Authors	Age	Type locality	Location	Notes	Images
Ameghinoia	Gen et sp nov	jr synonym	Viana & Haedo Rossi	Middle Eocene	Ventana Formation	Argentina	A Myrmeciine ant jr synonym of Archimyrmex; The type species is A. piatnitzkii	

== Molluscs ==
=== Gastropods ===
Name	Novelty	Status	Authors	Age	Type locality	Location	Notes	Images
Aplexa ricei	Sp nov	valid	Russell	Eocene; Ypresian	Okanagan Highlands; Allenby Formation	Canada; British Columbia	An aplexine physid bladder snail	
Ferrissia arionoides	Sp nov	valid	Russell	Eocene; Ypresian	Okanagan Highlands; Allenby Formation	Canada; British Columbia	An ancyline planorbid ramshorn snail	
Micropyrgus camselli	Sp nov	valid	Russell	Eocene; Ypresian	Okanagan Highlands; Allenby Formation	Canada; British Columbia	A Hydrobiid mud snail	
Physa saxarubrensis	Sp nov	valid	Russell	Eocene; Ypresian	Okanagan Highlands; Allenby Formation	Canada; British Columbia	A physine physid bladder snail	
Stagnicola tulameenensis	Sp nov	valid	Russell	Eocene; Ypresian	Okanagan Highlands; Allenby Formation	Canada; British Columbia	A lymnaeine lymnaeid pond snail	

== Archosauromorpha ==
=== Newly named dinosaurs ===
Data are courtesy of George Olshevky's dinosaur genera list.

Name	Status	Authors		Age	Unit	Location	Notes	Images
Lexovisaurus	Valid	Robert Hoffstetter		Middle Jurassic (Callovian)	Oxford Clay Formation	United Kingdom France	A stegosaurid.	
Lusitanosaurus	Valid	Albert-Félix de Lapparent	Zbyszewski	Early Jurassic	Unnamed unit	Portugal	A basal thyreophoran.	

== Synapsids ==
=== Non-mammalian ===
Name	Status	Authors	Age	Unit	Location	Notes	Images
Colbertosaurus	Valid	Minoprio	Middle Triassic	Potrereillos Formation	Argentina	A traversodontid; a replacement name for Colbertia Minoprio (1954)	
Scalenodontoides	Valid	Crompton and Ellenberger	Late Triassic (late Norian-Rhaetian)	Lower Elliot Formation	Lesotho; South Africa	A traversodontid.	
