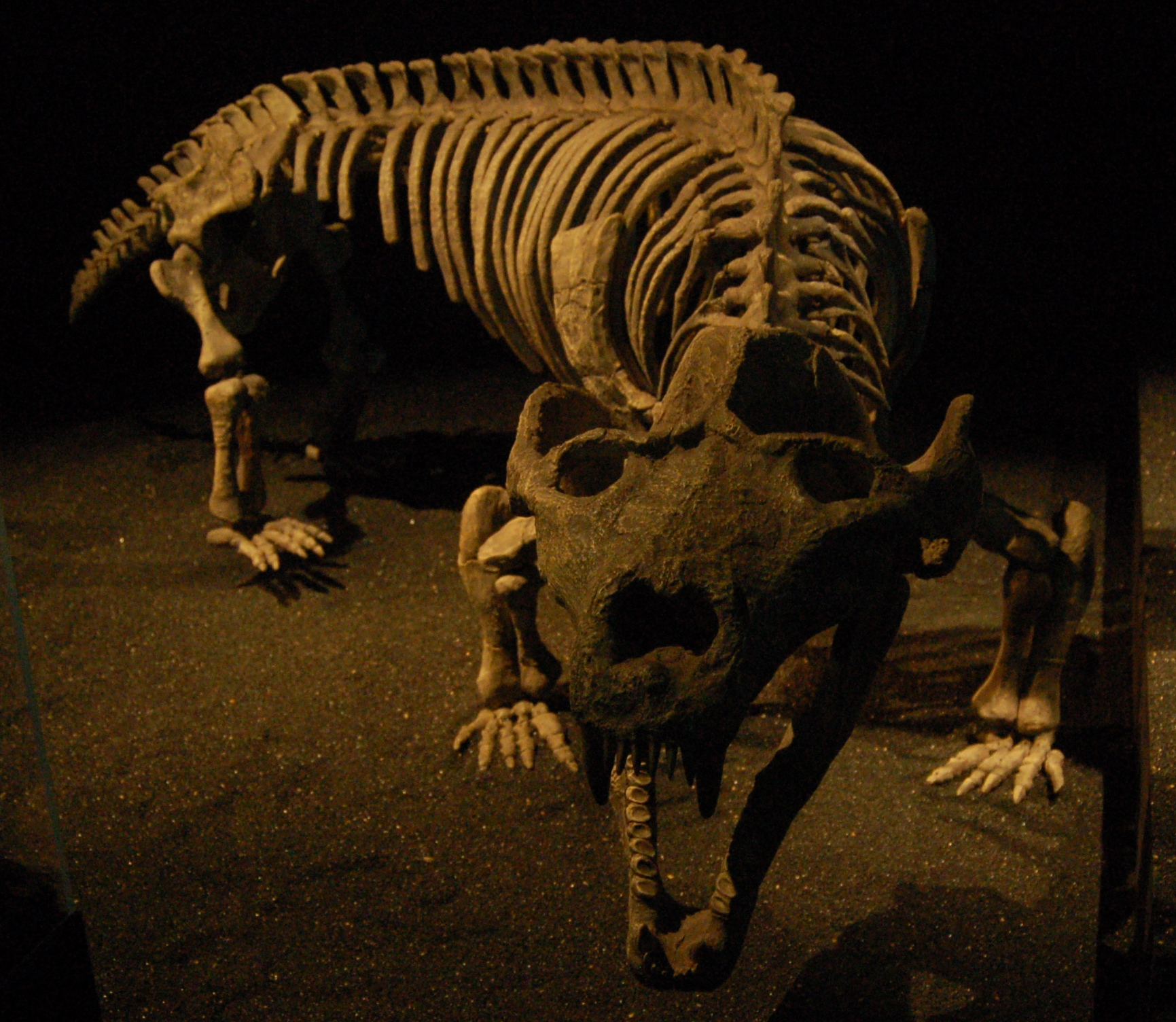
- Exhibit at Mori Tower

Scientific classification
- Kingdom: Animalia
- Phylum: Chordata
- Clade: Synapsida
- Clade: Therapsida
- Clade: Cynodontia
- Family: †Traversodontidae
- Subfamily: †Gomphodontosuchinae
- Genus: †Exaeretodon; Cabrera, 1943

Species
- †E. argentinus Cabrera, 1943 (type) [originally Belesodon argentinus]; †?E. major Huene, 1936 [originally Traversodon]; †E. riograndensis Abdala et al., 2002; †?E. statisticae Chatterjee, 1982

Synonyms
- Theropsis Cabrera, 1943; Ischignathus Bonaparte, 1963

= Exaeretodon =

Exaeretodon Temporal range: Ladinian-Norian ~235–205.6 Ma

Extinct genus of cynodonts

Exaeretodon is an extinct genus of fairly large, low-slung traversodontid cynodonts from the southern parts of Pangea. Four species are known, hailing from various formations. E. argentinus is from the Carnian-age (Late Triassic) Cancha de Bochas Member of the Ischigualasto Formation in the Ischigualasto-Villa Unión Basin in northwestern Argentina. E. major and E. riograndensis are from the Carnian-age portion of the Santa Maria Formation of the Paraná Basin in southeastern Brazil. E. statisticae is from the Carnian-age Lower Maleri Formation of India.

== Description ==
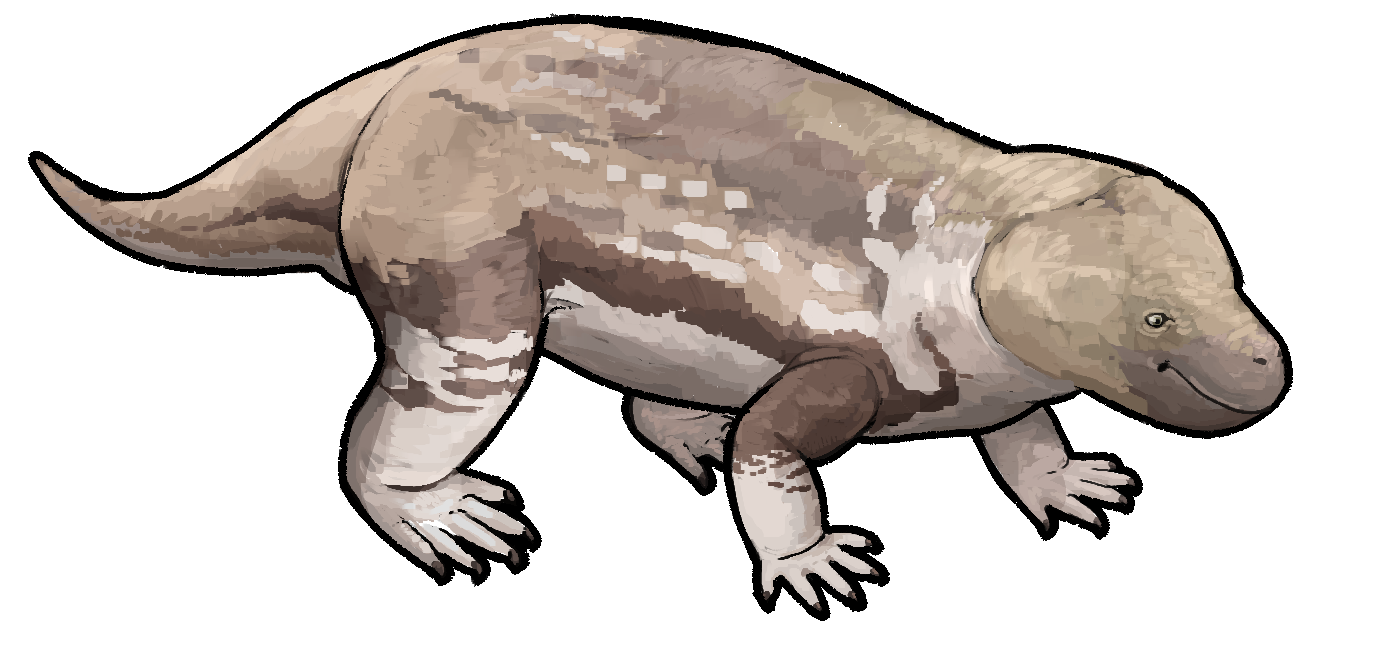
Restoration

This genus was an herbivore up to 1.8 meters (5.9 feet) long, with a specialized grinding action when feeding.

An analysis of the size of the bones of calves collected in Paleorrota concluded that the mother Exaeretodon had one or two calves, for one pregnancy.

== Taxonomy ==
Exaeretodon is a gomphodontosuchine cynodont. When he first named the species, Argentine paleontologist José Bonaparte mentioned several features that distinguish it from all other traversodontids. The tooth rows of the upper jaw are more parallel to each other in Ischignathus sudamericanus than they are in Exaeretodon, and they are also inset closer to the inside of the mouth. There are also more postcanine teeth oriented toward middle of the subtemporal fenestrae (two holes in the bottom of the skull) and ascending rama of the dentary (projections of the lower jaw that extend up to the skull). The ascending rama are also wider and taller in the I. sudamericanus specimen. The orbit or eye socket is longer than that of Exaeretodon, as are the palatine bones.

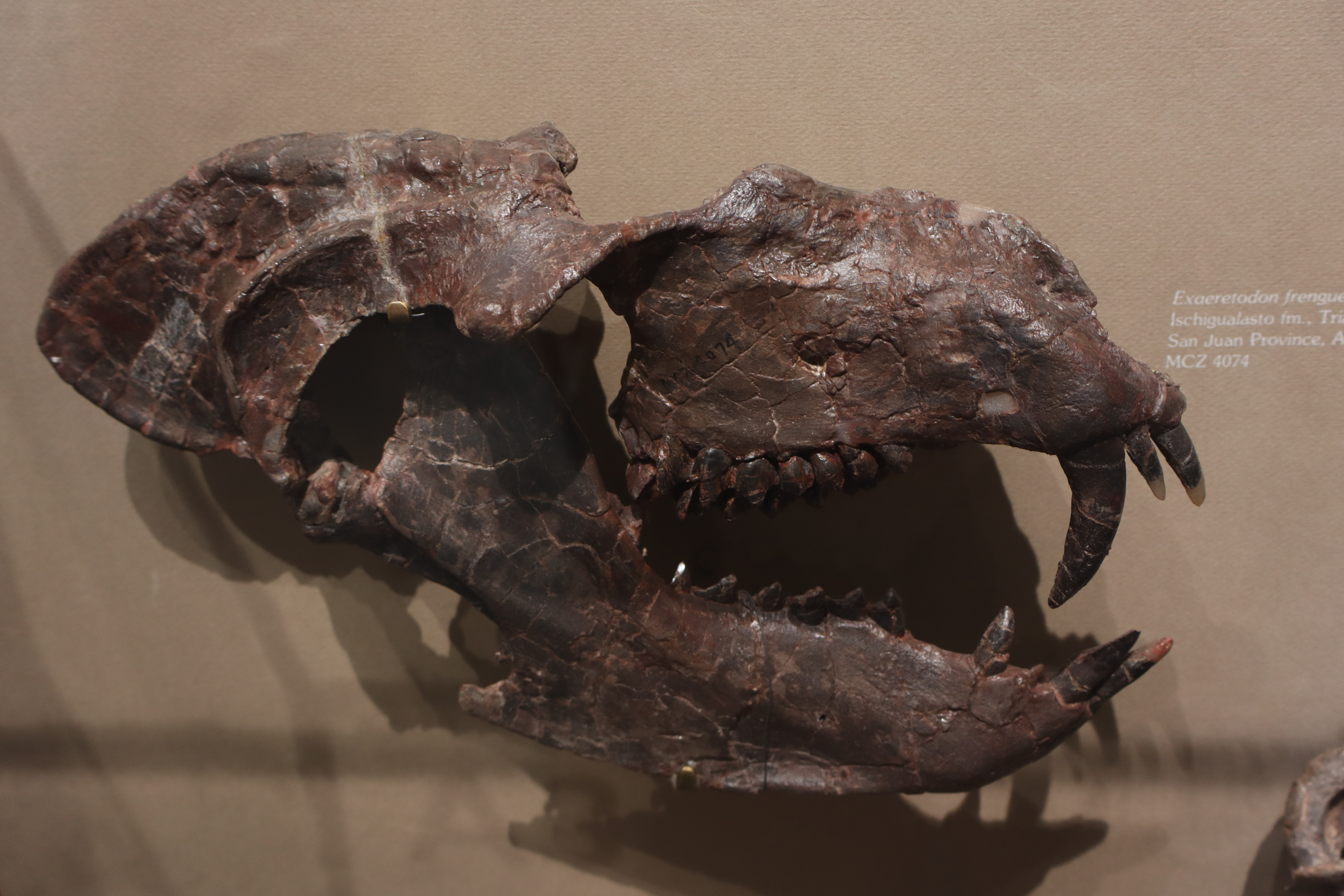
Skull of E. argentinus, Harvard Museum of Natural History

Despite the differences, a 2007 study concluded that the I. sudamericanus skull represents the same species as E. argentinus. Using allometry, paleontologist Jun Liu found I. sudamericanus to be the largest known example of a growth series in E. argentinus. Thus, Ischignathus is now regarded as a junior synonym of Exaeretodon. As the animal grew, the proportions of bones changed. These differing proportions were initially seen as species-distinguishing characters, but are now regarded as natural ontogenic variation.

Proexaeretodon vince was considered a synonym of Exaeretodon argentinus but was accepted as a valid taxon in 2023.

== Phylogeny ==
Exaeretodon in a cladogram after Kammerer et al. (2012):

- Cynognathia
  - Cynognathus
  - Gomphodontia
    - Diademodon
    - - Trirachodontidae
        - Trirachodon
        - - Cricodon
          - Langbergia
      - Traversodontidae
        - - Andescynodon
          - Pascualgnathus
        - - - Arctotraversodon
            - - Boreogomphodon
              - Nanogomphodon
          - - Massetognathinae
              - Massetognathus
              - - Dadadon
                - Santacruzodon
            - Gomphodontosuchinae
              - Gomphodontosuchus
              - - Menadon
                - - Protuberum
                  - - Exaeretodon
                    - Scalenodontoides

== Palaeobiology ==
Dental microwear observed on four postcanine teeth of E. argentinus suggests that E. argentinus masticated by moving its jaws in a palinal motion.

== Palaeoecology ==
Dental microwear evidence suggests that E. argentinus transitioned from utilising primarily crushing-based feeding in its early stages of development to primarily chewing-based feeding upon reaching adulthood. This suggests that juveniles of this species were to some degree faunivorous.

== Palaeopathology ==
A pathological specimen of E. riograndensis has been found containing callouses in the ribs that correspond to a healed transverse fracture that likely occurred after a fall or an episode of intraspecific or interspecific combat. These injuries would have significantly impacted the individual's mobility such that it would have been unable to survive alone, suggesting that the gregariousness of the species helped this individual survive such a debilitating injury.

== See also ==
- Media related to Exaeretodon at Wikimedia Commons
- Ischigualasto Formation
