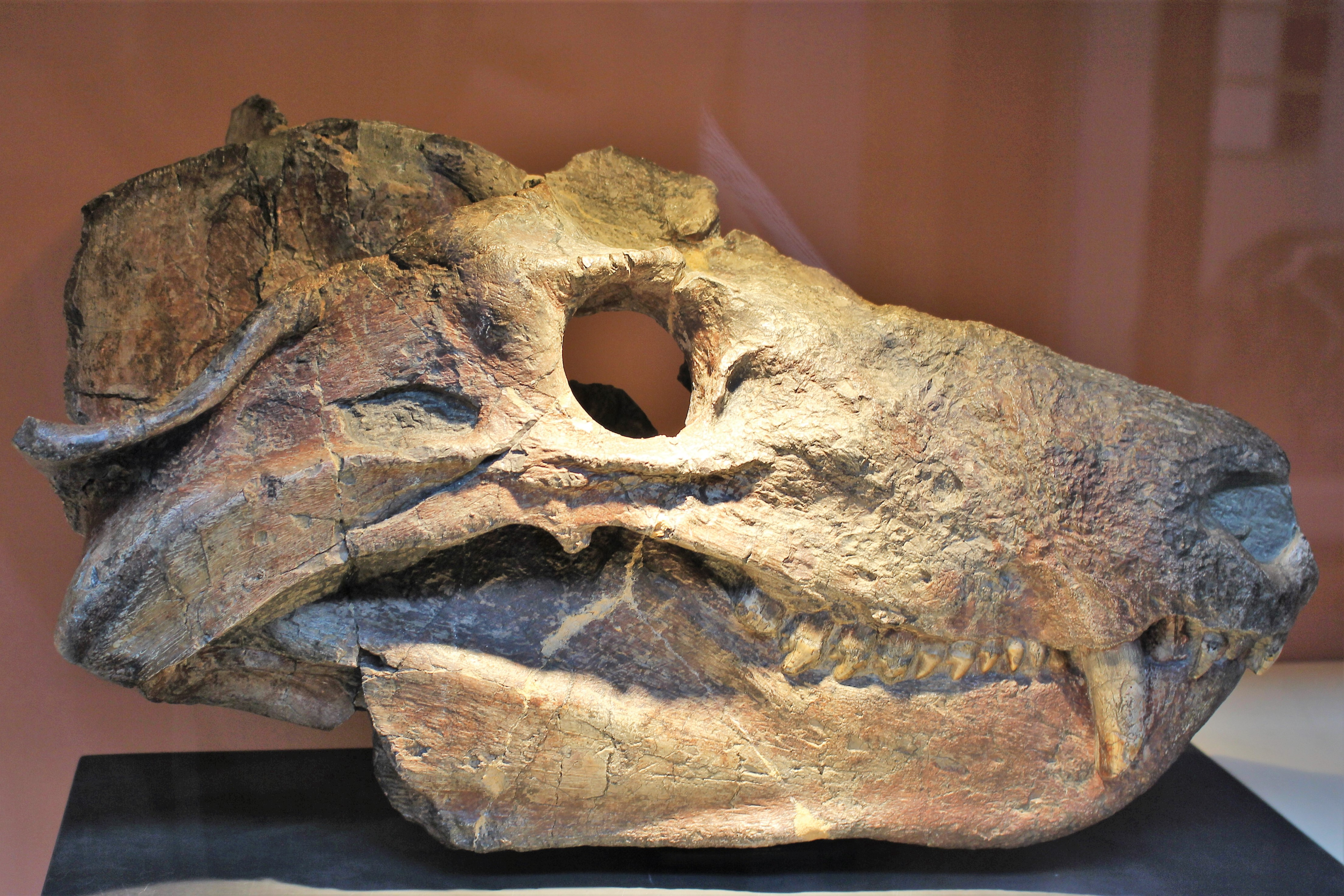
- Fossil skull of Cynognathus

Scientific classification
- Kingdom: Animalia
- Phylum: Chordata
- Clade: Synapsida
- Clade: Therapsida
- Clade: Cynodontia
- Clade: †Cynognathia
- Family: †Cynognathidae; Seeley, 1895
- Genus: †Cynognathus; Seeley, 1895

Type species
- †Cynognathus crateronotus Seeley, 1895

= Cynognathus =

Cynognathus Temporal range: Middle Triassic, 247–237 Ma

Extinct genus of cynodonts

Cynognathus is an extinct genus of large-bodied cynodontian therapsids that lived in the Middle Triassic. It is known from a single species, Cynognathus crateronotus. Cynognathus was a predator closely related to mammals and had a southern hemispheric distribution. Fossils have so far been recovered from South Africa, Argentina, Antarctica, and Namibia.

== Description ==
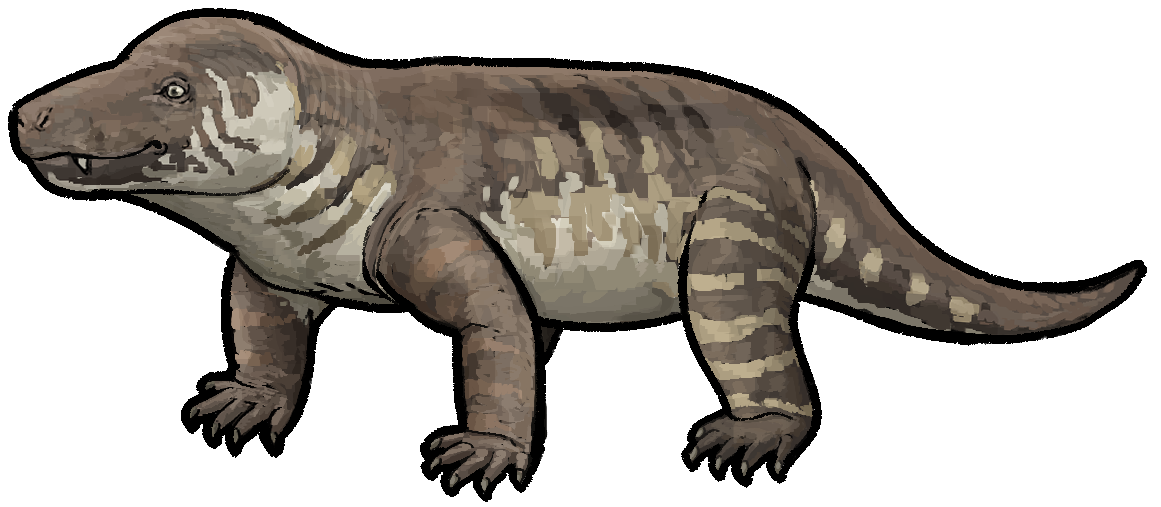
Life reconstruction of Cynognathus crateronotus

Cynognathus was a heavily built animal, and measured around 1.2 metres (3 ft 11 in) in snout-to-vent body length and up to 2 metres (6 ft 7 in) in total length. It was estimated to have weighed 100–110 kilograms (220–240 lb), to possibly 150 kilograms (330 lb). Cynognathus had a particularly large head, up to 40 centimetres (1 ft) in length, with wide jaws and sharp teeth. Its hindlimbs were placed directly beneath the body. There has been controversy about whether the forelimbs were also held upright or sprawled outwards in a reptilian fashion, but recent studies suggest cynodonts typically held their front legs in a posture between these two extremes. A study of living mammals concluded that "upright posture" in mammals is a myth based on the posture of mammal species specialized for fast running, such as dogs, hares, and antelopes; modern mammals that are not specialized for running often hold their forelimbs in a semi-sprawled posture.

Possible autapomorphies of C. crateronotus include an extremely elongated postorbital bar and sectorial postcanine teeth with two serrated cusps distal to a recurved apex.

== Discovery and naming ==
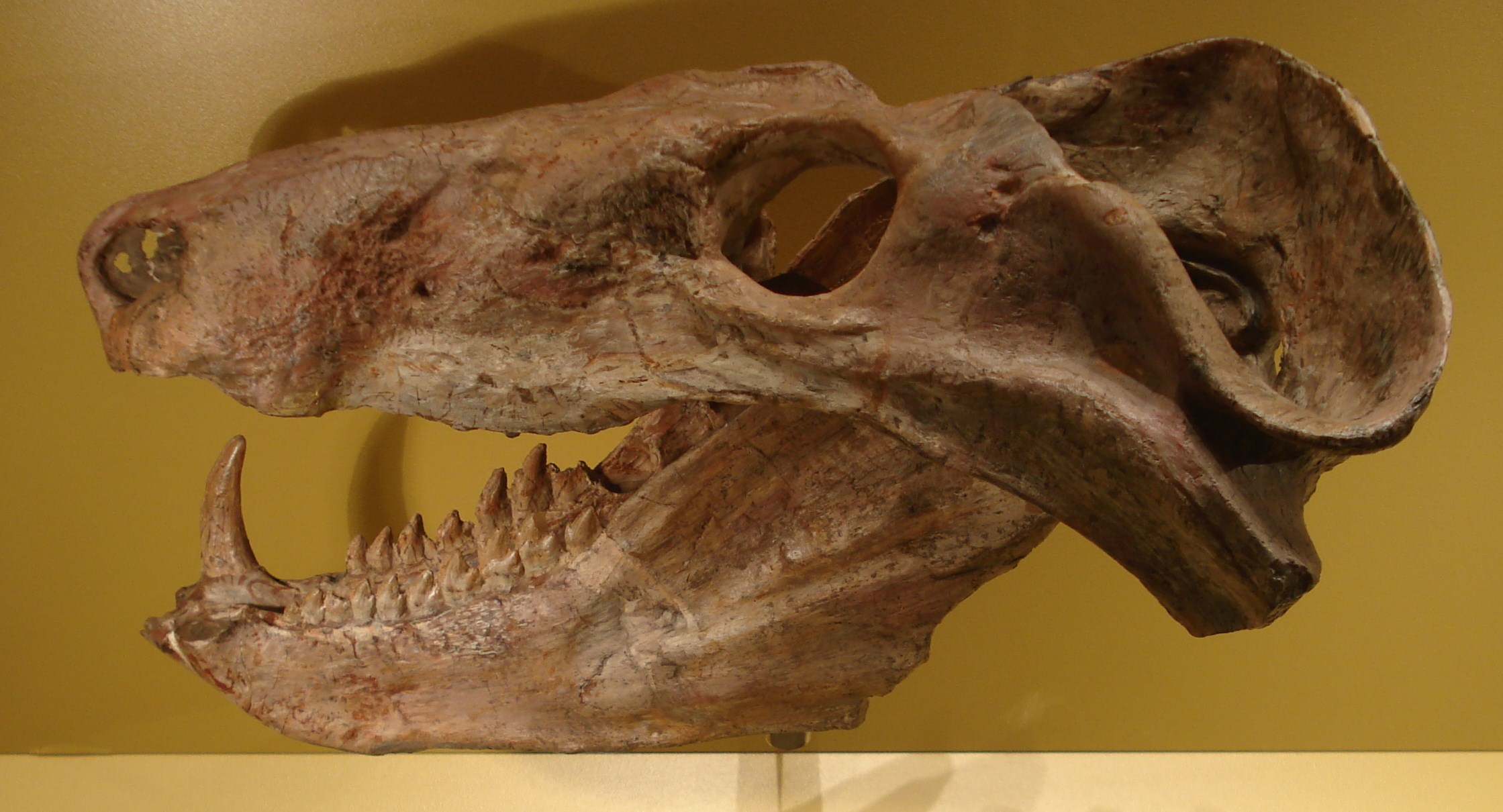
Skull

During 1888 and 1889, the British paleontologist Harry Govier Seeley visited southern Africa. In 1889, near Lady Frere, at a location where earlier Alfred Brown had discovered a tooth, Seeley excavated a skull and partial postcranial skeleton of a cynodontian. In 1894, Seeley named the genus Cynognathus with as type species Cynognathus crateronotus. Simultaneously, he named three other species in the genus: Cynognathus berryi, honouring James Berry who had assisted in the excavations, Cynognathus platyceps, the "flat jaw", and Cynognathus leptorhinus, the "slender nose". The generic name Cynognathus is derived from Ancient Greek kyon and gnathos, meaning "dog jaw". In 1895, Seeley published a more comprehensive description of these finds.

Fossil material probably belonging to the genus has been given several different names over the years. Generic synonyms include Cynidiognathus, Cynogomphius, Karoomys, Lycaenognathus, Lycochampsa and Lycognathus. Opinions vary as to whether all remains belong to the same species. The genus Karoomys is known only from a tiny juvenile. Species-level synonyms of Cynognathus crateronotus include Cynidiognathus broomi, Cynidiognathus longiceps, Cynidiognathus merenskyi, Cynognathus berryi, Cynognathus minor, Cynognathus platyceps, Cynogomphius berryi, Karoomys browni, Lycaenognathus platyceps, Lycochampsa ferox, Lycognathus ferox, and Nythosaurus browni.

== Distribution ==
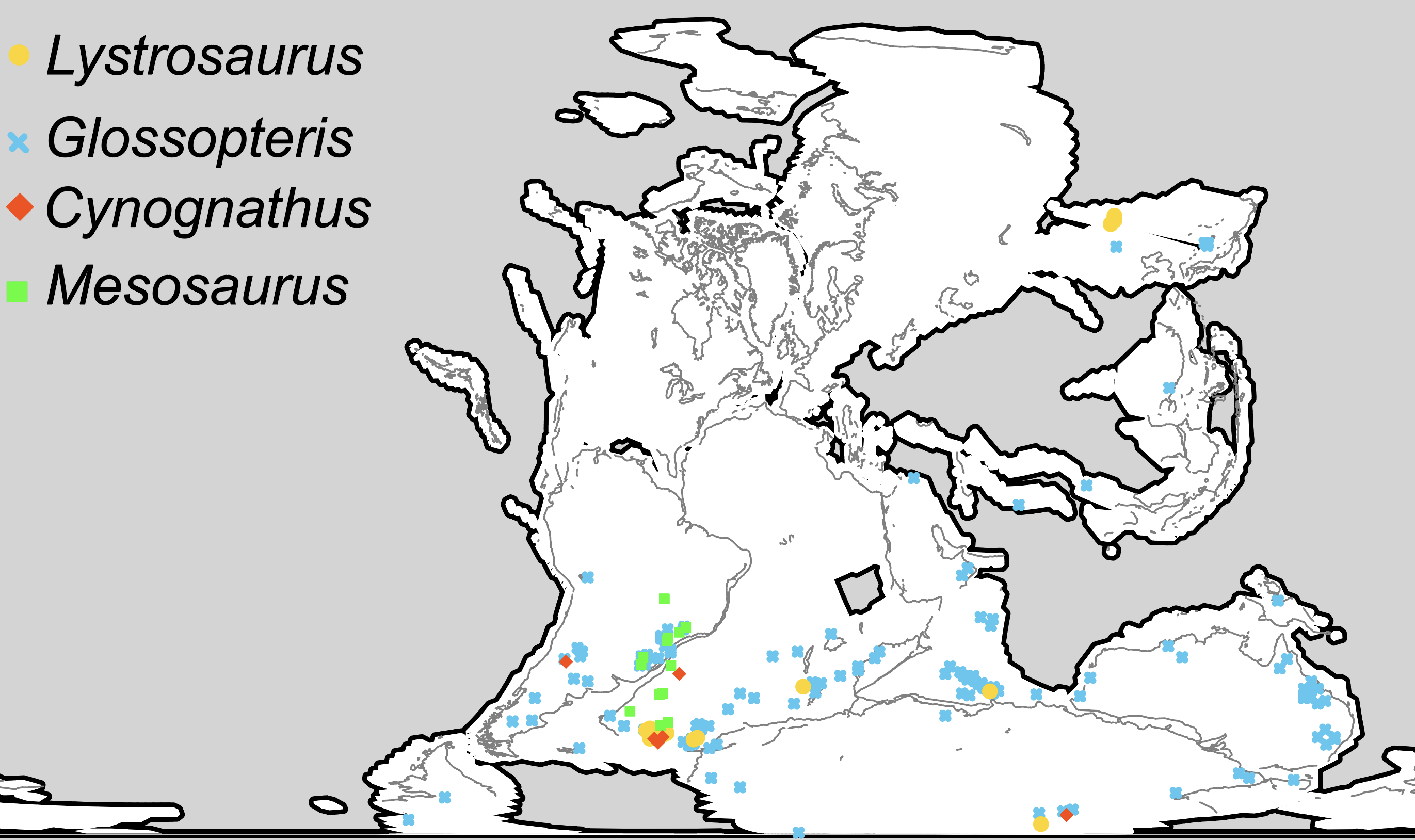
Distribution of four Permian and Triassic fossil groups used as biogeographic evidence for continental drift, and land bridging. Location of Cynognathus remains shown by red diamonds

Fossils have been found in the Karoo, the Puesto Viejo Formation, Fremouw Formation, in South Africa/Lesotho, Argentina and Antarctica.

Cynognathus lived between the Anisian and the Ladinian (Middle Triassic).

This genus forms a Cynognathus Assemblage Zone in the Beaufort Group of the Karoo Supergroup.

== Classification ==
Seeley in 1894/1895 placed Cynognathus in a separate family Cynognathidae, within the Cynodontia. Cynognathus is presently the only recognized member of the family Cynognathidae. Later a clade Cynognathia was named after the genus, within the Eucynodontia.

Cynognathus crateronotus in a cladogram after Stefanello et al. (2023):

- Cynognathia
  - Cynognathus crateronotus
  - Gomphodontia
    - Diademodon tetragonus
    - - Langbergia modisei
      - - Trirachodon berryi
        - - Sinognathus gracilis
          - Traversodontidae
            - Pascualgnathus polanskii
            - Luangwa drysdalli
            - Scalenodon angustifrons
            - Mandagomphodon hirschoni
            - - Massetognathus pascuali
              - Exaeretodon argentinus

== Paleobiology ==
Cynognathus is widely accepted to have been a carnivore. In the Karoo Basin in what is now South Africa, Cynognathus lived in open environments with warm, dry summers and cool, wet winters, similar to today's Western Cape region but more arid. Individuals grew rapidly and continuously. This suggests that Cynognathus may not have been greatly affected in the Karoo by the changing seasons. The dentary was equipped with differentiated teeth, with fangs in the front for seizing prey and wider teeth in the rear of the jaw suitable for cutting meat; these show this animal could effectively process its food before swallowing. The presence of a secondary palate in the mouth indicates that Cynognathus would have been able to breathe and swallow simultaneously.

Although it has previously been suggested that Cynognathus may have been warm blooded, analysis of the morphology of cynodont ear canals (which are suggested to vary in shape depending on the viscosity of the endolymph fluid, in turn dependent on body temperature) suggests that non-mammaliamorph cynodonts including Cynognathus were ectothermic.

The possible lack of belly ribs, in the stomach region, suggests the presence of an efficient diaphragm, an important muscle that allows mammals to breathe equally well when they are walking, running, or holding still.

Like other cynodonts outside of Prozostrodontia, Cynognathus probably lacked whiskers because the shape of the infraorbital canal for the infraorbital nerve in the premaxilla and maxilla does not have the retracted morphology typical of modern whisker-bearing mammals, and is instead more similar to the condition in living reptiles. Like other non-probainognathian members of Cynodontia, Cynognathus may have also lacked hair because it generally (thought not universally) has an open pineal foramen (the opening for the parietal eye at the top of the skull, which regulates the circadian rhythm and thermoregulation), because the genes for hair development and the closure of the pineal foramen are closely linked in modern mammals.

== See also ==
- Evolution of mammals
- Thrinaxodon
