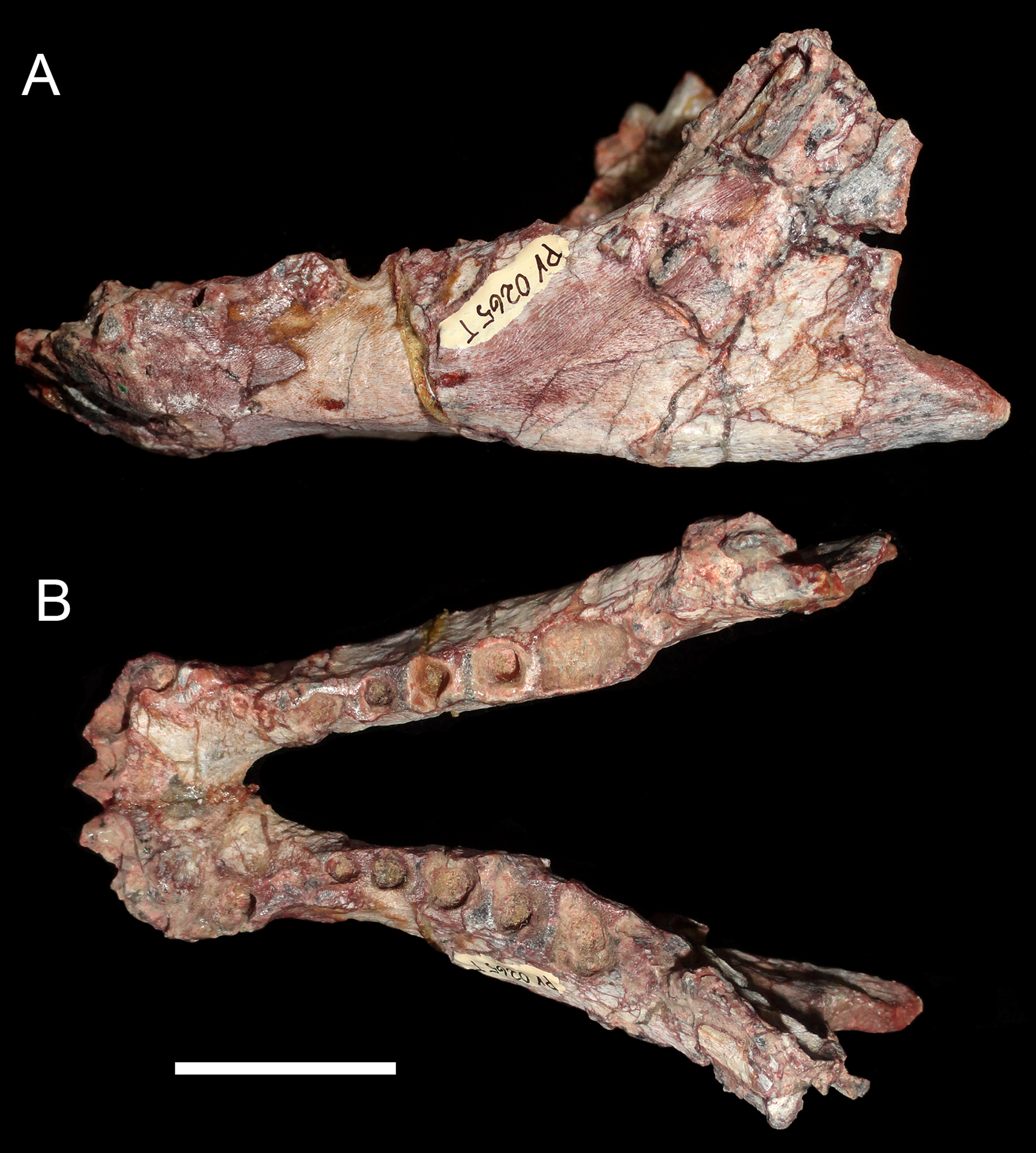
- Lower jaws of Luangwa sp.

Scientific classification
- Kingdom: Animalia
- Phylum: Chordata
- Clade: Synapsida
- Clade: Therapsida
- Clade: Cynodontia
- Family: †Traversodontidae
- Subfamily: †Traversodontinae
- Genus: †Luangwa; Brink, 1963

Species
- †L. drysdalli (type); †L. sudamericana

= Luangwa (cynodont) =

Luangwa Temporal range: Middle Triassic

Extinct genus of cynodonts

Luangwa is an extinct genus of traversodontid cynodonts. The species Luangwa drysdalli was discovered 1963 in the valley of the Luangwa river in Zambia, Africa. Luangwa lived in the Triassic period 240 Million years ago.

In July 2008, a skull of Luangwa sudamericana was found in the Brazilian town of Dona Francisca (Rio Grande do Sul), which is part of the Geopark Paleorrota. The discovery was made by a team of the ULBRA.

== Phylogeny ==
Luangwa in a cladogram after Stefanello et al. (2023):

- Cynognathia
  - Cynognathus crateronotus
  - Gomphodontia
    - Diademodon tetragonus
    - - Langbergia modisei
      - - Trirachodon berryi
        - - Sinognathus gracilis
          - Traversodontidae
            - Pascualgnathus polanskii
            - Luangwa drysdalli
            - Scalenodon angustifrons
            - Mandagomphodon hirschoni
            - - Massetognathus pascuali
              - Exaeretodon argentinus
