= Ruberodon =

Ruberodon Temporal range: Late Triassic

Scientific classification
- Kingdom: Animalia
- Phylum: Chordata
- Clade: Synapsida
- Clade: Therapsida
- Clade: Cynodontia
- Family: †Traversodontidae
- Subfamily: †Gomphodontosuchinae
- Genus: †Ruberodon; Ray, 2015

Type species
- †Ruberodon roychowdhurii Ray, 2015

Extinct genus of cynodonts

Ruberodon is an extinct genus of traversodontid cynodonts known from the type and only species Ruberodon roychowdhurii from the Late Triassic of India. Ruberodon was named in 2015 on the basis of several isolated lower jaws found in the Tiki Formation. The lower jaw of Ruberodon has three pairs of incisors, one pair of canines, and 9 pairs of postcanine teeth. The first pair of incisors is enlarged and protrudes forward from the tip of the jaw and there is a gap called a diastema between the canines and postcanines. Phylogenetic analysis indicates that among traversodontids, R. roychowdhurii is most closely related to Exaeretodon statisticae, which is also from India.
