= Kataigidodon =

Kataigidodon Temporal range: Late Triassic, Norian ~221 Ma

Scientific classification
- Domain: Eukaryota
- Kingdom: Animalia
- Phylum: Chordata
- Clade: Synapsida
- Clade: Therapsida
- Clade: Cynodontia
- Clade: Eucynodontia
- Genus: †Kataigidodon; Kligman, Marsh, Sues & Sidor, 2020
- Species: †K. venetus

Binomial name
- †Kataigidodon venetus Kligman, Marsh, Sues & Sidor, 2020

Extinct genus of eucynodont cynodonts

Kataigidodon ("thunderstorm tooth") is an extinct genus of eucynodont cynodont therapsid that was discovered in the Chinle Formation of Arizona. It is a monotypic genus, with only type species Kataigidodon venetus known.

== Description ==
The large mental foramen of Kataigidodon venetus is anteroposteriorly longer than it is tall. It opens on the lateral side of the dentary below the first and second postcanine teeth. The mental foramen is at the anterior end of a shallow lateral fossa. The large size and dimensions of this foramen are distinct from most eucynodonts, where the foramen is small and circular. It most closely resembles those of the traversodonts Boreogomphodon and Arctotraversodon. Anterior to the mental foramen on the lateral dentary surface is a scattering of numerous tiny pits, which represent immature bone grain.
