= Colbertosaurus =

Colbertosaurus Temporal range: Middle Triassic

Scientific classification
- Kingdom: Animalia
- Phylum: Chordata
- Clade: Synapsida
- Clade: Therapsida
- Clade: Cynodontia
- Family: †Traversodontidae
- Genus: †Colbertosaurus; Minoprio, 1954

Species
- †C. muralis Minoprio, 1954 (type)

Extinct genus of cynodonts

Colbertosaurus is an extinct genus of traversodontid cynodonts from the Middle Triassic of Argentina. A single species C. muralis was named in 1954 from a fragmentary jaw. Colbertosaurus was originally placed in Ictidosauria, an outdated name for a group of cynodonts that includes tritheledontids. It is the only cynodont known from the Potrerillos Formation and is similar in appearance to Pascualgnathus from the Puesto Viejo Formation. The similarity between the two traversodontids has been used to correlate the two formations.
