= Proexaeretodon =

Proexaeretodon Temporal range: Ladinian-Norian ~235–205.6 Ma

Scientific classification
- Domain: Eukaryota
- Kingdom: Animalia
- Phylum: Chordata
- Clade: Synapsida
- Clade: Therapsida
- Clade: Cynodontia
- Family: †Traversodontidae
- Subfamily: †Gomphodontosuchinae
- Genus: †Proexaeretodon; Bonaparte, 1963

Species
- †P. vincei Bonaparte 1963) (type)

Extinct genus of cynodonts

Proexaeretodon is a genus of traversodontid from the Late Triassic (Carnian) Ischigualasto Formation of Argentina. Although long considered a junior synonym of Exaeretodon, Schmitt et al. revalidated this genus in 2023 based on comparisons with Santagnathus.
