= Microscalenodon =

Microscalenodon Temporal range: Rhaetian

Scientific classification
- Domain: Eukaryota
- Kingdom: Animalia
- Phylum: Chordata
- Clade: Synapsida
- Clade: Therapsida
- Clade: Cynodontia
- Family: †Traversodontidae
- Genus: †Microscalenodon; Hahn, Lepage, & Wouters, 1988

Type species
- † Microscalenodon nanus Hahn, Lepage, & Wouters, 1988

Extinct genus of cynodont

Microscalenodon is an extinct genus of traversodontid cynodont from the Late Triassic of what is today Belgium. The type and only species is M. nanus.

== See also ==
- List of therapsids
