= Habayia =

Habayia Temporal range: Late Triassic

Scientific classification
- Domain: Eukaryota
- Kingdom: Animalia
- Phylum: Chordata
- Clade: Synapsida
- Clade: Therapsida
- Clade: Cynodontia
- Family: †Traversodontidae
- Subfamily: †Arctotraversodontinae
- Genus: †Habayia; Godefroit, 1999

Species
- †H. halbardieri Godefroit, 1999 (type)

Extinct genus of cynodonts

Habayia is an extinct genus of traversodontid cynodonts from the Late Triassic of Belgium. A single postcanine tooth was found in Habay-la-Vieille in southern Belgium. Based on the size of the tooth, Habayia was very small. Habayia lived during the Rhaetian stage of the Late Triassic at a time when western Europe was an island archipelago due to high sea levels. The small size of Habayia may be a result of insular dwarfism.
