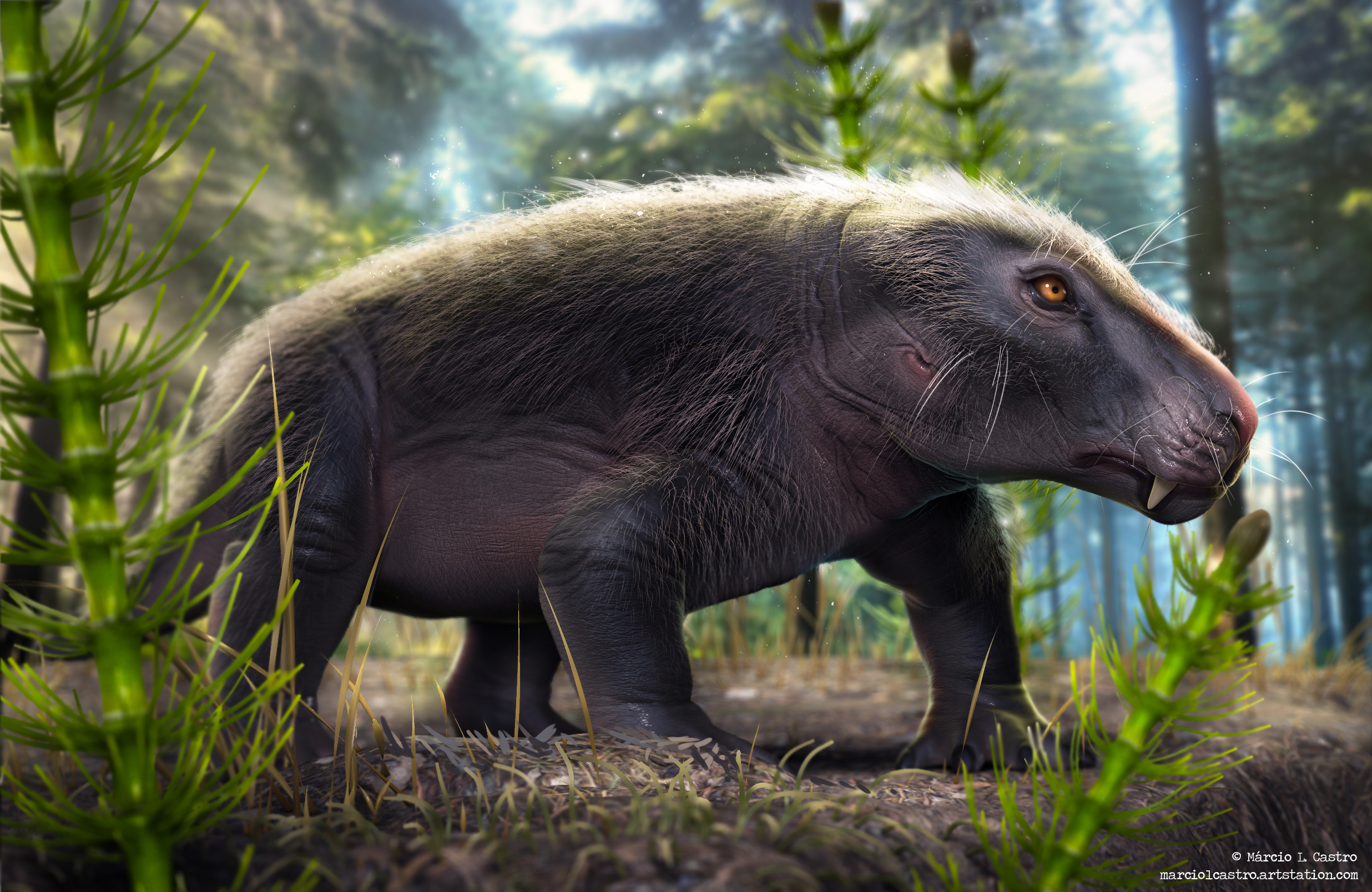
- Life restoration of Siriusgnathus
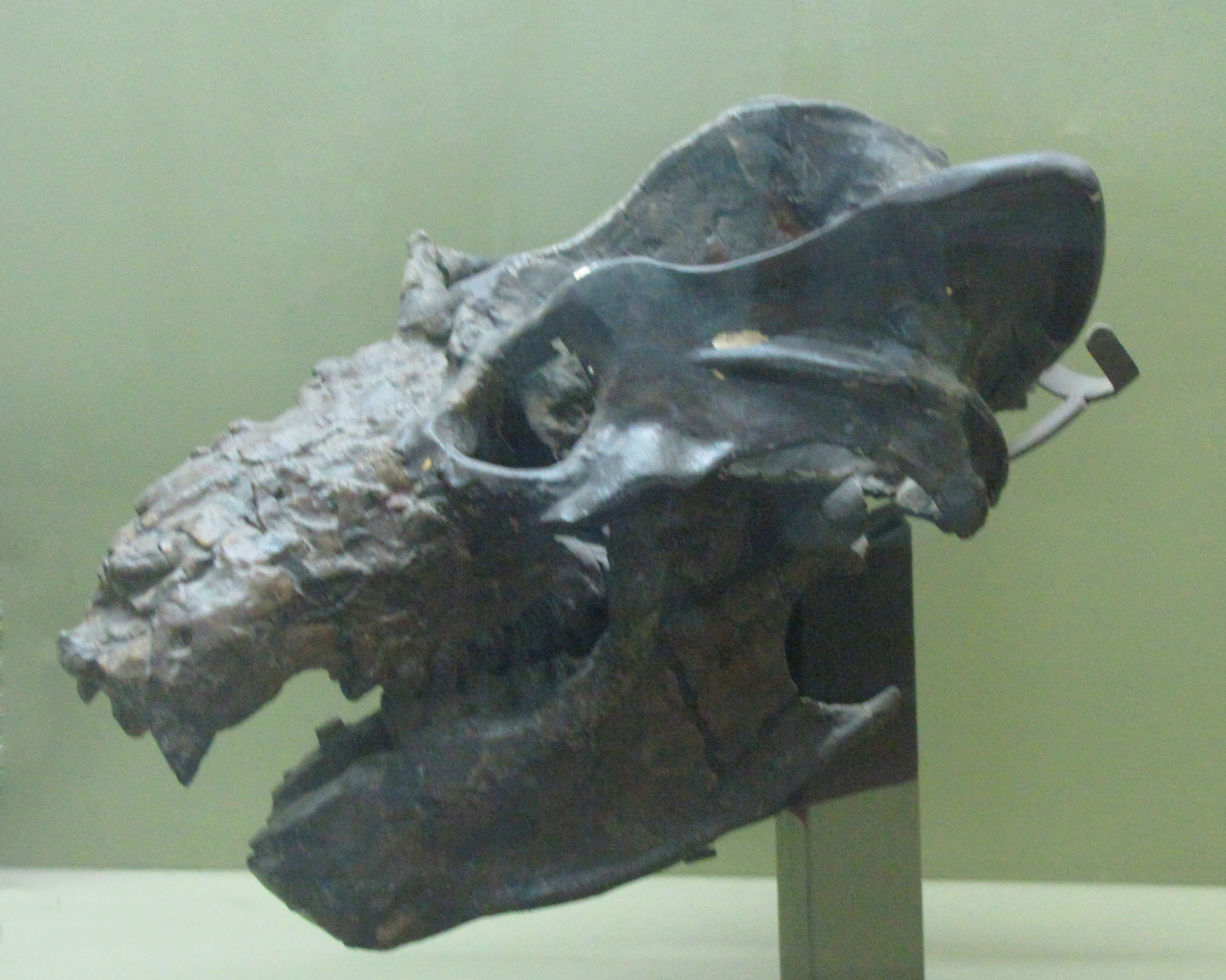
- Skull of Exaeretodon

Scientific classification
- Kingdom: Animalia
- Phylum: Chordata
- Clade: Synapsida
- Clade: Therapsida
- Clade: Cynodontia
- Clade: †Neogomphodontia
- Family: †Traversodontidae von Huene, 1936

Subgroups
- †Andescynodon; †Colbertosaurus; †Etjoia; †Gornogomphodon?; †Mandagomphodon; †Nanogomphodon; †Paratraversodon; †Pascualgnathus; †Scalenodon; †Theropsodon; †Arctotraversodontinae; †Gomphodontosuchinae; †Massetognathinae; †Traversodontinae; †Luangwa; †Traversodon

= Traversodontidae =

Traversodontidae Temporal range: Middle Triassic - Late Triassic, 247–201.3 Ma

Extinct family of cynodonts

Traversodontidae is an extinct family of herbivorous cynodonts. Traversodonts were primarily Gondwanan, with many species known from Africa and South America. Recently, traversodonts have also been found from Europe and North America. Traversodonts first appeared in the Middle Triassic and diversified in the Late Triassic before going extinct at the end of the epoch. The family Traversodontidae was erected by Friedrich von Huene in 1936 for cynodonts first found in São Pedro do Sul in Paleorrota, Brazil.

== Description ==
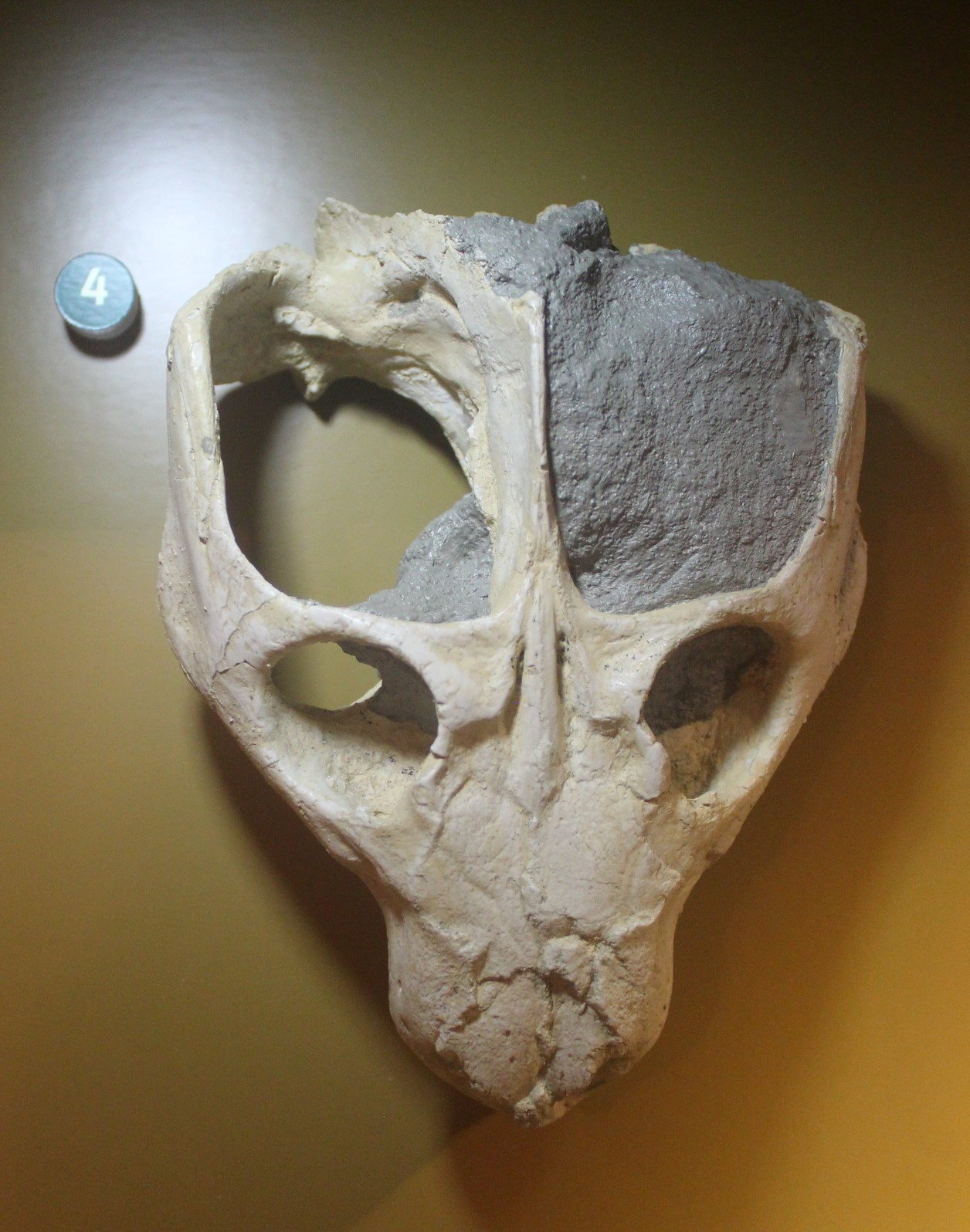
Skull of Dadadon

Traversodonts are members of Gomphodontia, a group of herbivorous cynognathian cynodonts. As an adaptation toward eating plants, they have wide postcanine teeth behind large canines. These postcanines are closely spaced with their crowns touching each other. Each is usually wider than it is long and is covered in several cusps. Because of their complexity, postcanine teeth are the primary means of identifying and distinguishing different species of traversodonts.

Traversodonts have relatively short skulls. The snout is much narrower than the back of the skull. The tip of the snout is wider than the middle, as it constricts behind the large canines. The tooth rows of the upper jaws are inset while the maxillae and zygomatic arches extend outward, suggesting that traversodonts may have had cheeks. Primitive features of traversodonts include costal plates around the vertebrae, which stabilize the spine. These plates were lost in more advanced traversodonts like Exaeretodon.

== Phylogeny ==
Traversodontidae belongs to a large clade of cynodonts called Cynognathia. Most phylogenetic analyses place it as the sister taxon to the family Trirachodontidae, and both groups are placed in the cynognathian clade Gomphodontia. The analysis of Kammerer et al. (2012) found strong support for two clades within Traversodontidae: the subfamily Gomphodontosuchinae, which had been identified in 2008, and the newly named subfamily Massetognathinae. Below is a cladogram from that analysis:

- Cynognathia
  - Cynognathus
  - Gomphodontia
    - Diademodon
    - - Trirachodontidae
        - Trirachodon
        - - Cricodon
          - Langbergia
      - Traversodontidae
        - - Andescynodon
          - Pascualgnathus
        - - - Arctotraversodon
            - - Boreogomphodon
              - Nanogomphodon
          - - Massetognathinae
              - Massetognathus
              - - Dadadon
                - Santacruzodon
            - Gomphodontosuchinae
              - Gomphodontosuchus
              - - Menadon
                - - Protuberum
                  - - Exaeretodon
                    - Scalenodontoides

== Paleobiology ==
While most traversodonts were relatively large cynodonts, particularly Scalenodontoides with extrapolated 60cm skull making it potentially the largest nonmammalian cynodont, some Late Triassic European forms like Maubeugia and Habayia were very small. These traversodonts lived during the Rhaetian stage of the latest Triassic when rising sea levels divided western Europe into an island archipelago. Traversodontids on these islands likely became smaller as a result of insular dwarfism.

Dental microwear evidence reveals that traversodontids appear to have fed on relatively abrasive plant material relative to basal sauropodomorphs, which fed on softer vegetation, thus effectively partitioning their environment's resources with them.

== See also ==
- Evolution of mammals
