= Nanogomphodon =

Nanogomphodon Temporal range: Middle Triassic

Scientific classification
- Domain: Eukaryota
- Kingdom: Animalia
- Phylum: Chordata
- Clade: Synapsida
- Clade: Therapsida
- Clade: Cynodontia
- Clade: †Gomphodontia
- Clade: †Neogomphodontia
- Family: †Traversodontidae
- Genus: †Nanogomphodon; Hopson & Sues, 2006

Type species
- †Nanogomphodon wildi Hopson & Sues, 2006

Species
- †Nanogomphodon wildi Hopson & Sues, 2006

Extinct genus of cynodonts

Nanogomphodon is an extinct genus of cynodonts which existed in Germany during the Middle Triassic period.

Nanogomphodon were small herbivorous traversodontid gomphodonts. The type species is Nanogomphodon wildi. They are only known from a few isolated teeth recovered in 2006 from the Erfurt Formation of Baden-Württemberg, Germany.

The name comes from Greek for "dwarf peg tooth"; from νάνος (nános, 'dwarf'), γόμφος (gómphos, 'peg' or 'nail'), and ὀδούς (odoús, 'tooth').
