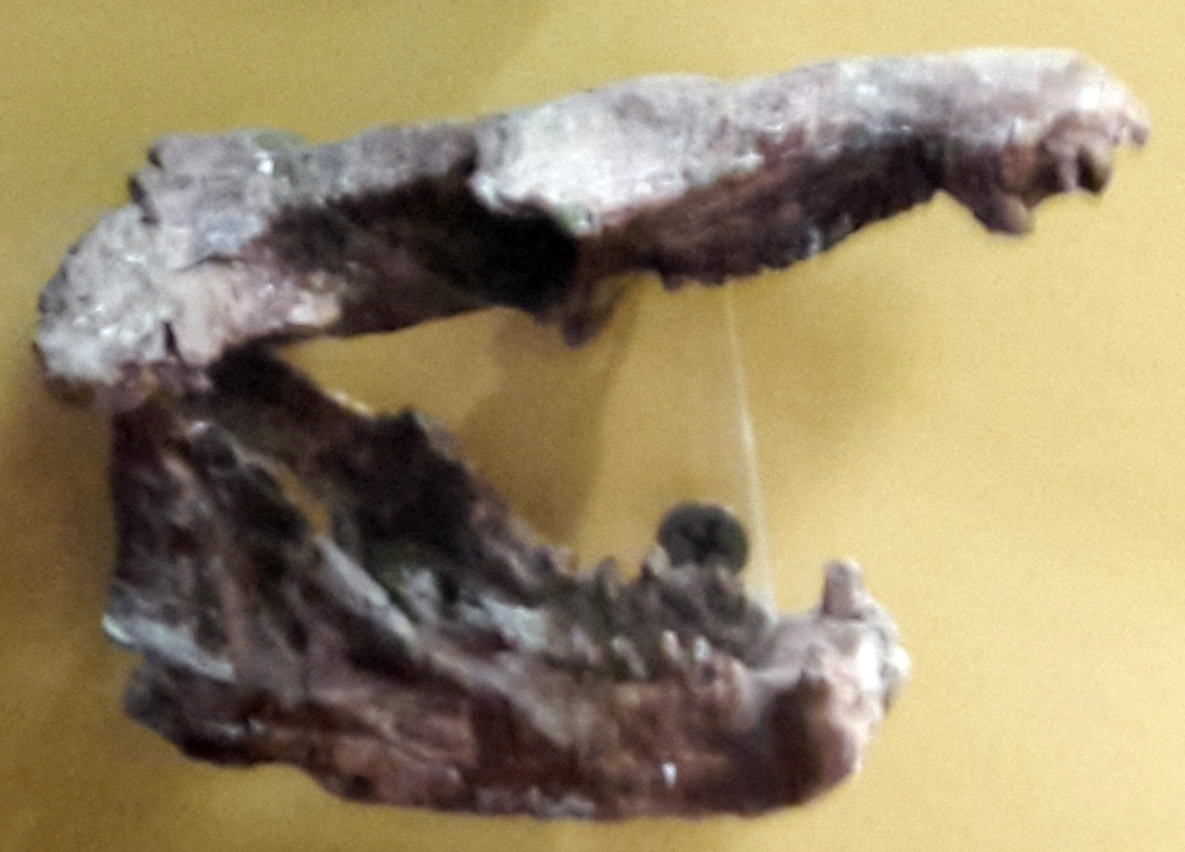
- Skull cast, Museum of Evolution of Polish Academy of Sciences, Warsaw

Scientific classification
- Domain: Eukaryota
- Kingdom: Animalia
- Phylum: Chordata
- Clade: Synapsida
- Clade: Therapsida
- Clade: Cynodontia
- Family: †Traversodontidae
- Genus: †Andescynodon; Bonaparte 1967

Species
- † A. mendozensis Bonaparte 1967 (type)

Synonyms
- Rusconiodon mignonei Bonaparte 1970

= Andescynodon =

Andescynodon Temporal range: Middle Triassic

Extinct genus of cynodonts

Andescynodon is a genus of traversodontid cynodonts from the Middle Triassic of Argentina. Fossils are known from the Cerro de las Cabras and Cacheutá Formations. Andescynodon is one of the most basal traversodontids. Another traversodontid called Rusconiodon has also been identified from the Cerro de las Cabras Formation but is now considered a junior synonym of Andescynodon.

== Description and history ==
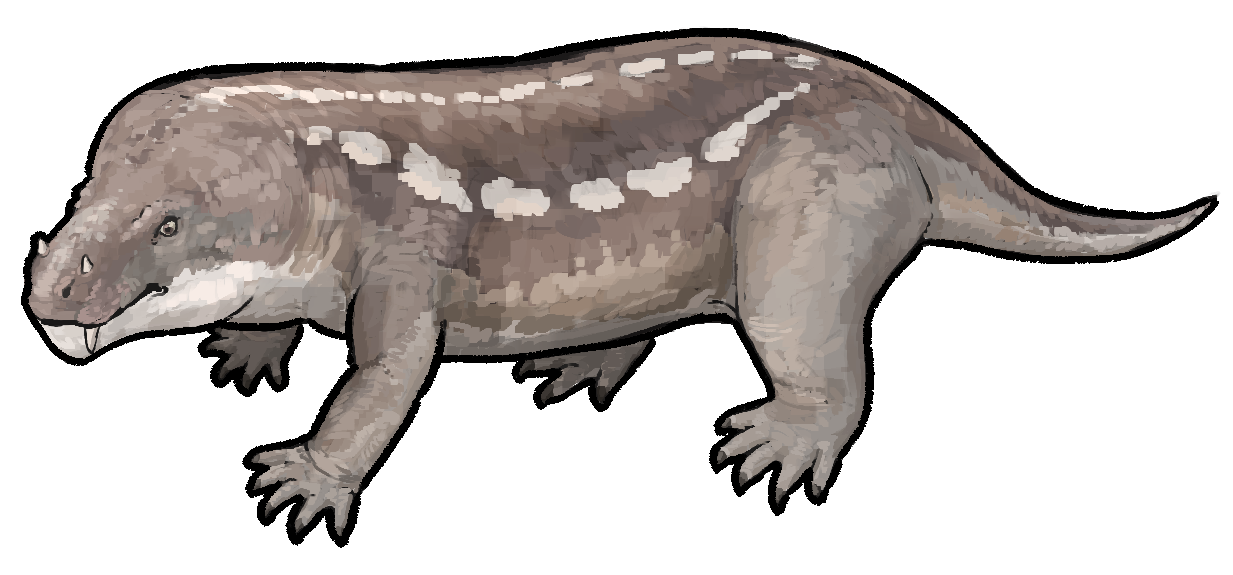
Life Restoration

The type species Andescynodon mendozensis was named in 1967 and reported from the Rio Mendoza Formation. The location where remains have been found was later shown to be part of the Cerro de las Cabras Formation.

Like all traversodontids, Andescynodon has wide postcanine teeth at the back of its jaws. These wide teeth are seen as evidence of a herbivorous diet and give traversodontids their name (their teeth are transversely wide). One distinguishing feature of Andescynodon is the forward position of a ridge on these postcanine teeth. The temporal region behind the skull is large, but smaller than those of related traversodontids. The snout is much narrower, but widens toward its tip. The skull of Andescynodon is also flatter than most traversodontids.

Rusconiodon mignonei was named in 1970 from the same locality as Andescynodon mendozensis. Rusconiodon was distinguished from Andescynodon because it had larger canine teeth. Between the nostril openings and the canines, Rusconiodon skulls had a hole called the paracanine fossa. This fossa was also present in Andescynodon skulls, but did not emerge as a hole on the upper surface of the snout. The paracanine fossa provides room for the canine teeth of the lower jaw, which were especially large in Rusconiodon specimens.

The variation in size of the teeth were considered to be the result of natural intraspecific variation by Liu and Powell (2009). The skulls of A. mendozensis and R. mignonei represented one species, and because Andescynodon was named first, its name takes priority. Rusconiodon individuals have larger upper canine teeth because their overall body size is larger. Therefore, the two types represent a growth series, with Andescynodon representing smaller individuals and Rusconiodon representing larger ones.

== Classification ==
Andescynodon is one of the most basal members of Traversodontidae, a group of cynodonts that was common in South America during the Triassic. Pascualgnathus is a very close relative of Andescynodon but can be distinguished by the greater amount of incisor and postcanine teeth. While Pascualgnathus has three incisors on each side of the upper jaw, while Andescynodon has four (a primitive feature for a traversodontid). Andescynodon also has more postcanine teeth than Pascualgnathus. Its skull is lower and its temporal fenestrae, a pair of holes at the back of the skull, are shorter and narrower. The postcranial bones of Andescynodon are similar to those of the more basal gomphodont Diademodon, suggesting that it had a relatively primitive morphology.
