= Sinognathus =

Sinognathus Temporal range: Anisian, 247.2–242.0 Ma

Scientific classification
- Domain: Eukaryota
- Kingdom: Animalia
- Phylum: Chordata
- Clade: Synapsida
- Clade: Therapsida
- Clade: Cynodontia
- Family: †Trirachodontidae
- Subfamily: †Sinognathinae
- Genus: †Sinognathus; Young, 1959
- Species: †S. gracilis

Binomial name
- †Sinognathus gracilis Young, 1959

Extinct genus of cynodonts

Sinognathus is an extinct genus of gomphodont cynodonts from the Middle Triassic Ermaying Formation of China. Its type and only species is Sinognathus gracilis, which was named in 1959 by the Chinese palaeontologist C. C. Young.
