= Scalenodon =

Scalenodon Temporal range: Middle Triassic

Scientific classification
- Domain: Eukaryota
- Kingdom: Animalia
- Phylum: Chordata
- Clade: Synapsida
- Clade: Therapsida
- Clade: Cynodontia
- Family: †Traversodontidae
- Genus: †Scalenodon; Crompton, 1955

Species
- †S. angustifrons (Parrington, 1955 [originally Trirachodon angustifrons]) (type); †S. boreus Tatarinov, 1973; †S. ribeiroae Melo, Martinelli & Soares, 2017; †?S. attridgei Crompton, 1972; †?S. charigi Crompton, 1972

Extinct genus of cynodonts

Scalenodon is an extinct genus of traversodontid cynodonts from the Middle Triassic of Africa and possibly Russia. The type species S. angustifrons was named in 1946 and several other species were named in the following years. Most of the species from Africa are now thought to belong to different genera than Scalenodon.

== History and species ==
The first fossils belonging to Scalenodon were found in the Manda Formation of Zambia and assigned to Trirachodon angustifrons in 1946. In 1955, the species was given its own genus, Scalenodon. In 1963, a second species called S. drysdalli was named from the Ntawere Formation in the Luangwa Valley of Zambia. Later that year S. drysdalli was placed in its own genus, Luangwa. Three additional species, S. attridgei, S. charigi, and S. hirschoni, were named from the Manda Formation in 1972. In 1973, a Russian species of Scalenodon was named S. boreus. S. boreus is known from the southern Ural Mountains of Orenburg Oblast.

A 2003 analysis of traversodontid relationships did not find the species of Scalenodon from the Manda Formation to form a single clade, meaning that many were not referable to the genus. The study suggested that S. hirschoni had more in common with other traversodontids like Luangwa. S. attridgei was viewed as a possible synonym of S. charigi, which was also found to be only distantly related to S. angustifrons. S. hirschsoni was placed in its own genus, Mandagomphodon, in 2013.

S. angustifrons and S. boreus remain valid species of Scalenodon. While S. angustifrons is known from partial skulls, teeth, and a lower jaw, S. boreus is known only from two upper postcanine teeth.
