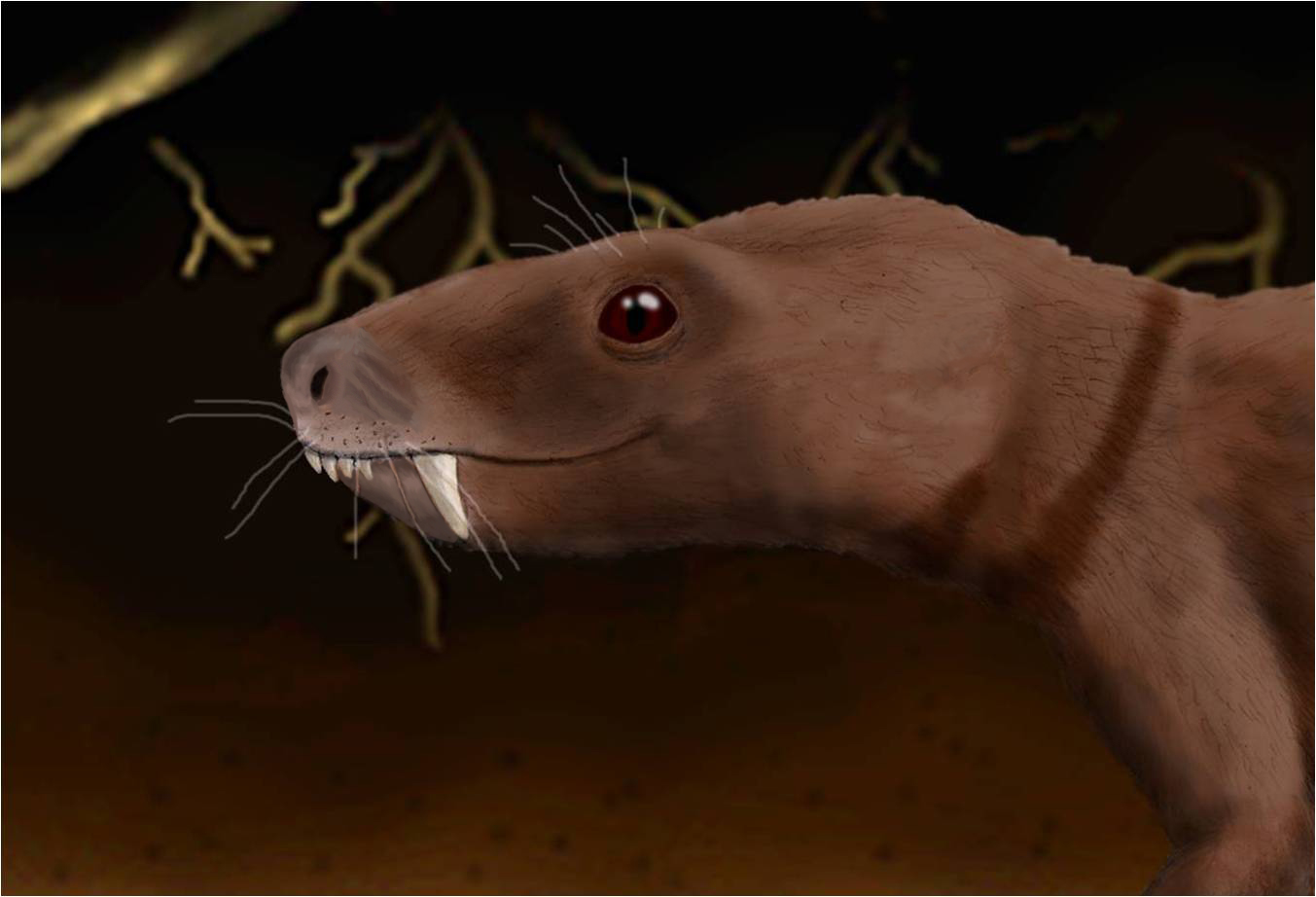

Scientific classification
- Domain: Eukaryota
- Kingdom: Animalia
- Phylum: Chordata
- Clade: Synapsida
- Clade: Therapsida
- Clade: Cynodontia
- Clade: †Neogomphodontia
- Genus: †Trirachodon; Seeley, 1895

Species
- T. berryi Seeley, 1895 (type)

Synonyms
- T. kannemeyeri Seely, 1895; T. minor Broom, 1905

= Trirachodon =

Trirachodon Temporal range: Early-Middle Triassic

Extinct genus of cynodonts

Trirachodon (Greek: "three ridge tooth") is an extinct genus of cynodonts. Fossils have been found in the Cynognathus Assemblage Zone of the Beaufort Group in South Africa and the Omingonde Formation of Namibia, dating back to the Early and Middle Triassic.

== Description ==
The skull of Trirachodon had a short, narrow snout with a wide orbital region. The zygomatic arches were relatively slender. Trirachodon was quite small for a cynodont, growing no larger than 50 cm in length. It had noticeably less molariform teeth than its closely related contemporary Diademodon. These teeth tended to be transversely broader than Diademodon as well. A bony secondary palate and precise postcanine tooth occlusion are seen as derived characteristics in Trirachodon that are similar to those of mammals.

== Species ==
The type species is T. berryi, named in 1895 on the basis of a single cranial skeleton. Three other specimens were later referred to T. kannemeyeri, which was distinguished from the type on the basis of snout length and number of postcanine teeth. These differences have since been considered too small to assign them to two different species, and thus the T. kannemeyeri has fallen out of use due to this possible synonymy.

A new species, T. minor, was named by Robert Broom in 1905 to describe a poorly preserved snout. Broom later named T. browni in 1915, in which he distinguished it from all other species on the basis of the length of the molars. In 1932, Broom proposed that T. berryi be reassigned to a new genus, Trirachodontoides. Another species of Trirachodon called T. angustifrons was named in 1946 from a narrow skull found in Tanzania, but this material was later proven to be from the traversodontid Scalenodon. All species of Trirachodon were suggested to by synonymous with the type species in 1972 except T. browni, which was synonymous with Diademodon tetragonus.

== Paleobiology ==
Trirachodon is thought to have had a fossorial lifestyle. Scratch-marked burrow complexes found from the Driekoppen Formation in northeastern Free State, South Africa as well as the Omingonde Formation in Namibia have been attributed to the genus. At least 20 individuals have been found in one of the complexes. The entrance shafts slope down at shallow angles and have bilobate floors and vaulted roofs. The floors of the lower levels are less noticeably bilobate. The burrows typically terminate quite narrow. The tunnels tend to tightly curve as they progress deeper, with chambers branching off at right angles to the main tunnel. A semi-erect posture of the hindlimbs of Trirachodon is seen as an adaptation for sustained efficiency in locomotion in the tunnels. The relatively thick walls seen in these bones may also have provided extra rigidity to the limbs while digging. The burrows where the occupants were preserved inside are thought to have been filled with sediment in a flash flood; if it were a gradual filling, the occupants would have had time to evacuate.

Many features of the burrows suggest that they were used as colonial dwelling structures. The wide entrance would have been useful for a burrow inhabited by many individuals, and branching tunnels and terminating chambers would unlikely have been made by one animal. The worn, bilobate floors suggest that the tunnels were used rather frequently by numerous inhabitants as they passed one another while moving through them.

A colonial lifestyle for Trirachodon suggests complex social behaviors previously thought to be unique to Cenozoic mammals, and is one of the earliest signs of cohabitation in a burrow complex by tetrapods (a partial burrow cast associated with Thrinaxodon liorhinus, also from the Beaufort Group, has recently been found that predates these burrows by several million years). There have been many suggested reasons for this behavior in Trirachodon, including protection from predation, sites for reproduction and or rearing young, and thermoregulation.

Recent studies in the bone histology of many specimens of Trirachodon have led to an increased understanding of the ontogeny and lifestyle of these animals. There is evidence in the growth rings of bones that growth rates in these animals was strongly influenced by the fluctuation in seasonal conditions in their environment.
