= Pascualgnathus =

Pascualgnathus Temporal range: Middle Triassic, Anisian

Scientific classification
- Kingdom: Animalia
- Phylum: Chordata
- Clade: Synapsida
- Clade: Therapsida
- Clade: Cynodontia
- Family: †Traversodontidae
- Genus: †Pascualgnathus; Bonaparte, 1966

Species
- †P. polanskii Bonaparte, 1966 (type)

Extinct genus of cynodonts

Pascualgnathus is an extinct genus of traversodontid cynodonts from the Middle Triassic of Argentina. Fossils have been found from the Río Seco de la Quebrada Formation of the Puesto Viejo Group. The type species P. polanskii was named in 1966.

== Description ==
Pascualgnathus is a small traversodontid. Its body mass is estimated to have been between 2.5 and 6 kg. It has large upper canine teeth and small postcanine teeth. The postcanine teeth of Pascualgnathus and other traversodontids are wide, allowing them to eat plant material. The upper postcanines of Pascualgnathus are rectangular. Each has a central ridge and a cusp on the side facing the mouth. There are also two cusps on the side of the tooth facing the lips, with one being larger than the other. The lower postcanines have less of a rectangular shape and have only two cusps. Unlike the upper postcanines, they are longer than they are wide.

== Classification ==
When Pascualgnathus was first named in 1966, it was considered a member of the family Diademodontidae more closely related to the African genus Trirachodon than the South American genus Diademodon. Diademodon was later uncovered from the Río Seco de la Quebrada Formation alongside Pascualgnathus, suggesting that the ancestors of Pascualgnathus migrated from Africa to South America.
