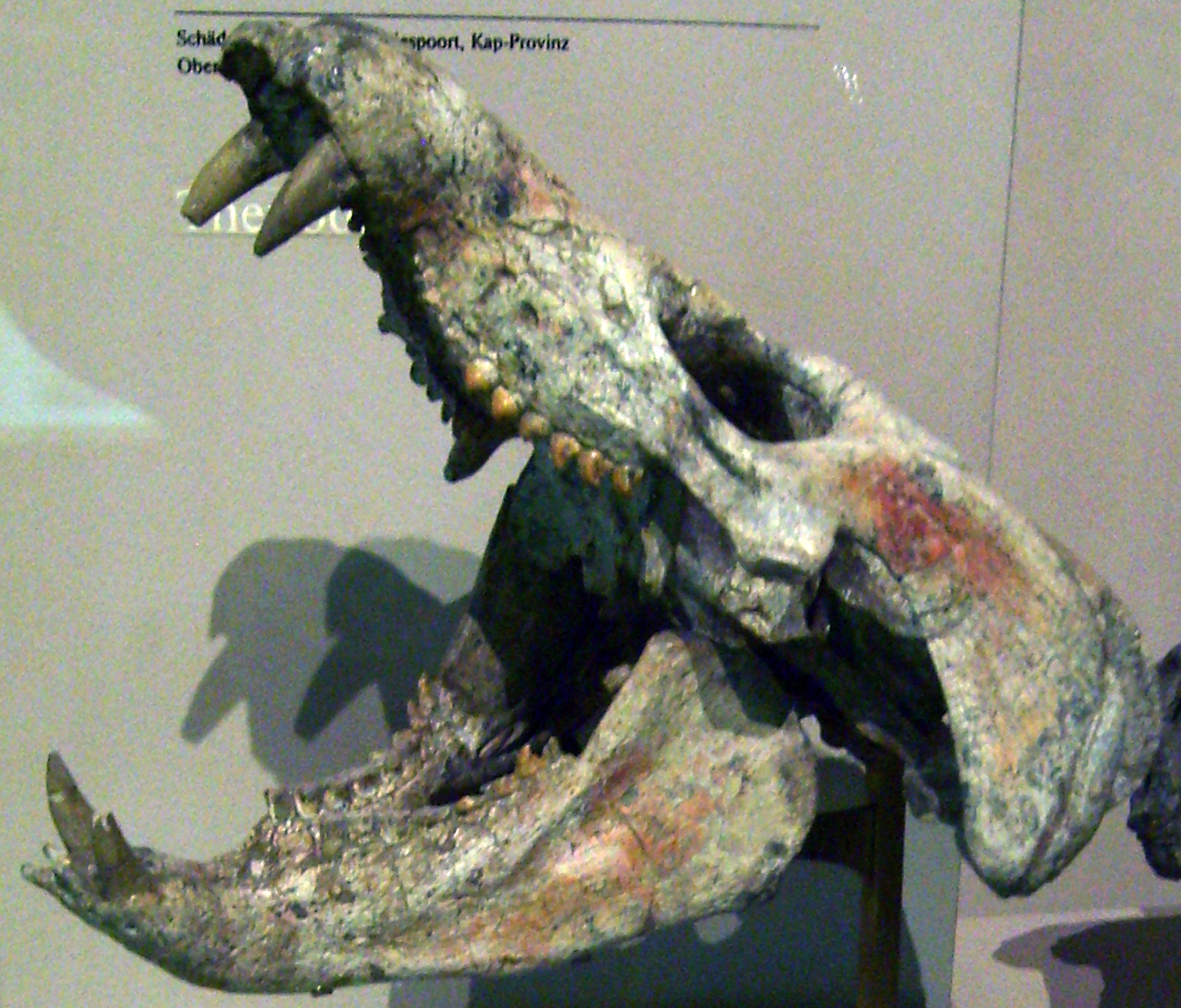
- Skull at the Museum für Naturkunde, Berlin

Scientific classification
- Kingdom: Animalia
- Phylum: Chordata
- Clade: Synapsida
- Clade: Therapsida
- Clade: Cynodontia
- Family: †Diademodontidae
- Genus: †Diademodon; Seeley, 1894

Type species
- †Diademodon tetragonus Seeley, 1894

Synonyms
- Genus-level: Cragievarus Brink, 1965; Species-level: Cragievarus kitchingi Brink, 1965; D. grossarthi Brink, 1979; D. mastacus Brink, 1979; D. rhodesiensis Brink, 1979; Trirachodon browni Broom, 1915

= Diademodon =

Diademodon Temporal range: Middle Triassic ~247–237 Ma

Extinct genus of cynodonts

Diademodon is an extinct genus of cynodonts. It was about 2 metres (6.6 ft) long.

== Discovery ==
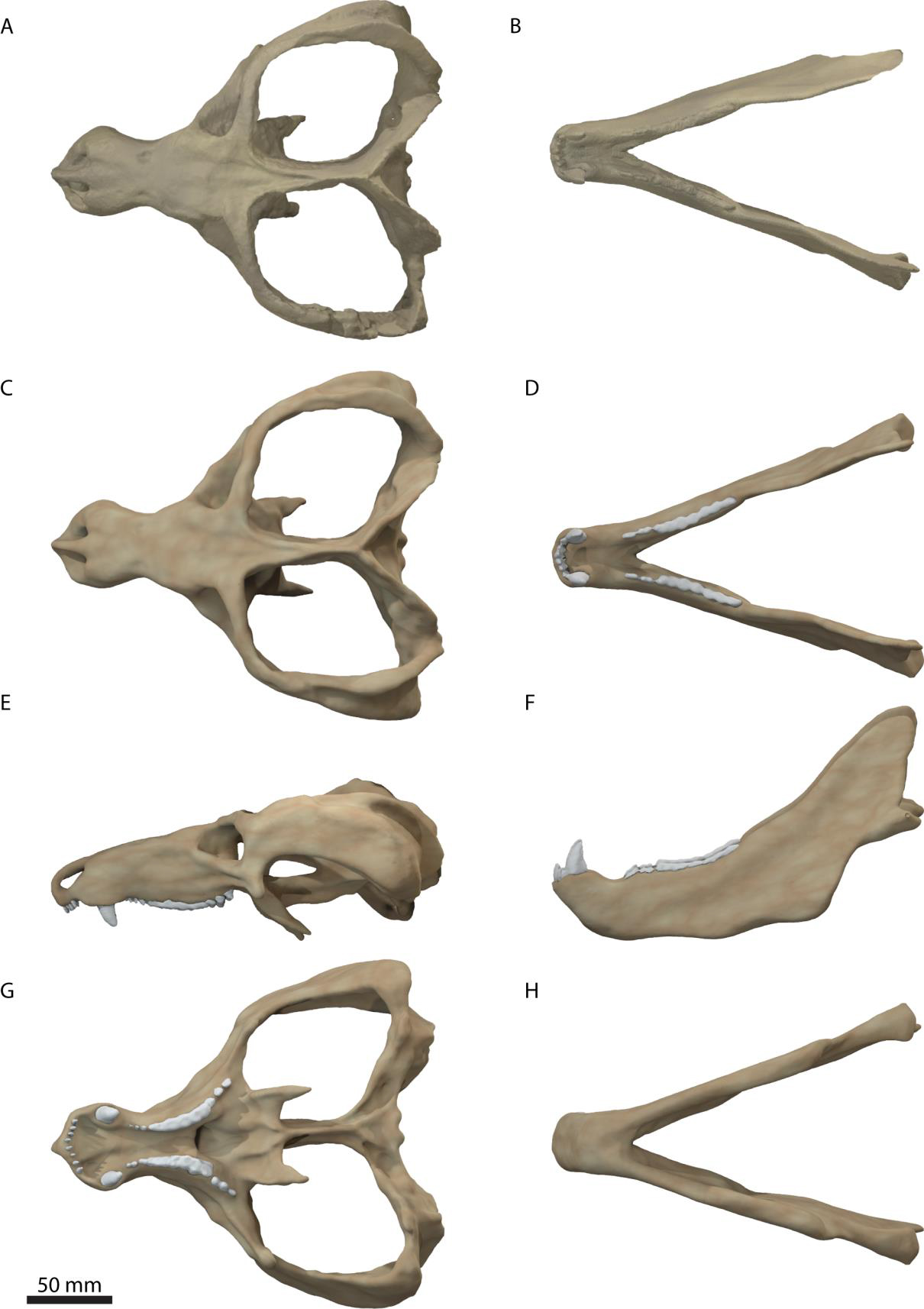
Restored skull based on CT cans

Harry Seeley had found his fossil in the Burgersdorp Formation of the Beaufort Group in the Karoo Basin of South Africa. As late as 1988, Diademodon had been considered a gomphodont due to its transversely expanded cheek teeth, however, it has since been placed in the order Cynodontia due to significant differences in skull morphology. Additional species were named by paleontologist A. S. Brink in 1979, although they are now considered synonyms of the type species Diademodon tetragonus. Fossils of the Diademodon tetragonus have more recently been found in the Omingonde Formation of Namibia, the Fremouw Formation of Antarctica, the Ntawere Formation of Zambia and the Río Seco de la Quebrada Formation in Mendoza Province, Argentina.

Although Diademodon is the most well accepted name for the genera to date, it was originally named Cynochampsa laniarius by Owen in 1860. The proposed name change occurred in 1982, where Grine defended the name proposed by Harry Seeley: Diademodon tetragonus and to be place in the group Therapsida, which was a group Owen had tiptoed around in his works on paleontology. Though Harry Govier Seeley had named Diademodon in 1894, which was after Owen had dubbed the genus Cynochampsa, Seeley had not realized the two were one and the same as the fossil that Owen named was claimed to have been found in a claystone nodule in the Renosterberg Mountains. A later paleontologist explored the same area where the fossil was claimed to have been found and declared no evidence of Cynognathus fossils.

== Description ==
Like many modern species of terrestrial reptiles, Diademodon possessed salt glands, as evidenced by depressions in its rostrum.

== Classification ==
Until a study performed by Botha and colleagues in 2005, the post cranial skeletons of Diademodon and its close relative, Cynognathus were near to impossible to distinguish. This was due to similarities in post cranial skeletons between the two genera and their identical unearthing sites. With new technology, the axial skeletons of Diademodon and Cynognathus were able to be teased apart. It was found that Diademodon had cylindrical growth patterns which may have been associated with changing seasons, whereas Cynognathus growth patterns were rapid and sustained.

== Palaeobiology ==
=== Diet ===
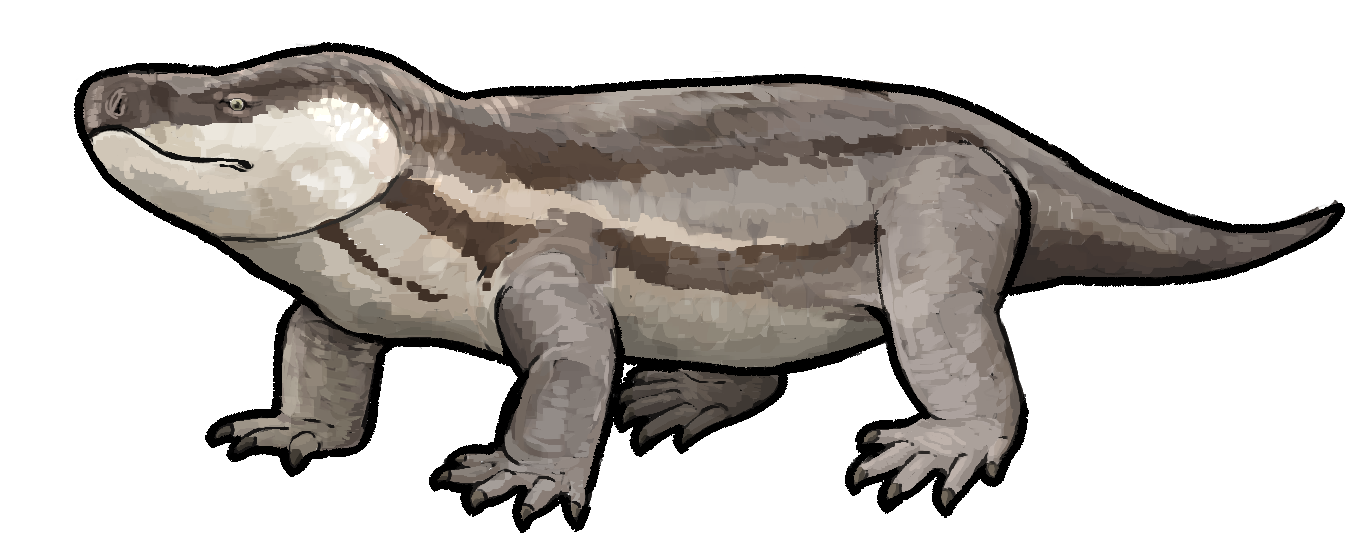
Life Restoration

For a long time Diademodon was largely characterized as being herbivorous, yet there is evidence which suggests it may have been omnivorous, there has not yet been a clear conclusion to the specifics of Diademodon’s diet. The reason for the unclear conclusions may be due to Diademodon’s counter intuitive teeth. The canines in Diademodon were very pronounced yet the post canines were thought to be adapted for vegetation. Through the examination of stable light isotopes of oxygen extracted from Diademodon fossils, it was able to be deduced that the organism relied heavily on water from sources other than leaves, namely streams, rivers, lakes, snowmelt and other such sources. It was these sources which allowed for a multitude of inferences to be made of Diademodon’s ecology. Diademodon’s preferred habitat was thought to have included much canopy cover and a cooler environment. These assumptions were inferred from the low carbon values found in extracted tissues. Another interpretation of this data was that Diademodon may have had hippo-like behavior, that is, it remained in deep pools of water during day hours and only left its aquatic environment at night to forage for food. This was interpreted from low oxygen values found in tissue samples. However, this idea was put to rest as Diademodon did not morphologically or isotopically reveal any adaptations for long term aquatic life. Its bone oxygen levels did not match those of other semiaquatic organisms, such as the hippopotamus. A third suggested possibility was that Diademodon may have been close to readily available water sources, though did not spend the majority of its life in them. It may have munched on shallow water seaweed, which is known to have lower oxygen content.

== See also ==
- Cynognathus
- Trirachodon
