= Río Seco de la Quebrada Formation =

Geological formation in Argentina

- Stratigraphic range: Anisian-Carnian?
- Type: Geological formation
- Unit of: Puesto Viejo Group
- Overlies: Quebrada de los Fósiles Formation

Lithology
- Primary: Conglomerate
- Other: Sandstone, shale, andesite

Location
- Coordinates: 34.9°S 68.6°W
- Approximate paleocoordinates: 51.5°S 34.1°W
- Region: Mendoza Province
- Country: Argentina
- Extent: San Rafael Block
- Río Seco de la Quebrada Formation (Argentina)

The Río Seco de la Quebrada Formation is a Triassic geological formation in Mendoza Province, Argentina. Fossils of cynodonts such as Cynognathus, Diademodon, and Pascualgnathus have been found in this formation, along with dicynodonts such as Vinceria and Acratophorus. Based on biostratigraphy, the Río Seco de la Quebrada Formation is considered to have formed during the Anisian stage, as it shares fauna with the upper subzones of the Cynognathus Assemblage Zone in South Africa. However, radiometric dating controversially argues that it was deposited during the early Carnian stage, 10 million years younger than expected otherwise.

== Geology ==
The Río Seco de la Quebrada Formation (RSQ) is the younger of the two formations in the Puesto Viejo Group, overlying the older Quebrada de los Fósiles Formation (QF). The Puesto Viejo Group is a geologically isolated succession of Triassic sedimentary and igneous rock exposed in the area of the San Rafael Block. It was referred to as the Puesto Viejo Formation until 2007, when it was elevated to group status and split into the Quebrada de los Fósiles and Río Seco de la Quebrada Formations. The Quebrada de los Fósiles Formation has mostly grey sediments, while the Río Seco de la Quebrada Formation is primarily red.

The lower portion of the Río Seco de la Quebrada Formation is dominated by poorly-sorted and trough cross-bedded conglomerate and bedded coarse sandstone. Shale is also developed in some areas. The lower and upper portions of the formation are separated by a thick andesite layer formed by lava flows from one or more fissure eruptions. The upper Río Seco de la Quebrada Formation is finer than the lower portion, with shale and fine tuffaceous sandstone being common and conglomerate only reappearing at the youngest extent of the formation.

=== Age ===
The age of the Río Seco de la Quebrada Formation is controversial. Biostratigraphy based on the synapsid fauna (Cynognathus, Diademodon, Kannemeyeria) has correlated the RSQ with subzone B and C of the South African Cynognathus assemblage zone (CAZ). The fauna of the upper CAZ are typically considered to be Anisian in age. The presence of traversodontids, which do not co-occur with the CAZ fauna in South Africa, suggests that the RSQ may be late Anisian. Some African formations have CAZ-type fauna in older levels and traversodontids in younger levels, such as the Ntawere Formation of Zambia, Manda Beds of Tanzania, and Omingonde Formation of Namibia. Another formation biostratigraphically similar to the Río Seco de la Quebrada is the Cerro de las Cabras Formation of the neighboring Cuyo Basin. This correlation was justified by the presence of Vinceria and traversodontids. The Cerro de las Cabras Formation may be slightly younger due to having more "advanced" traversodontids.

Radiometric dating attempts on the formation have provided a different picture. A 1975 study estimated via Potassium-Argon dating that the Puesto Viejo Group as a whole had an age of 228-236 Ma. More recently, SHRIMP Uranium-Lead dating obtained an age of 233.8-237.8 Ma from an ignimbrite layer directly underlying the RSQ. These point to an unusually young (Carnian) age for the formation, up to 10 million years younger than biostratigraphy would indicate. This may imply that the CAZ fauna is not as old as traditional biostratigraphy has argued, or that the CAZ fauna persisted in some areas much longer than previously thought.

Not all paleontologists are convinced by the purported young age of the RSQ. The estimated early Carnian age of the Río Seco de la Quebrada Formation is similar to that dated for the Chañares Formation in La Rioja Province, Argentina. However, the Chañares Formation lacks CAZ fauna, instead preserving more advanced species of cynodonts, dicynodonts, and archosauromorphs. This contradicts the widespread distribution of CAZ fauna and its close proximity to the Río Seco de la Quebrada Formation, implying a large temporal gap between the RSQ and Chañares formations. The dating methods used for finding the age of the RSQ have also been criticized based on the argument that SHRIMP dating is less accurate than CA-TIMS dating. More widespread radiometric dating is required to clarify the temporal extent of the CAZ fauna. The upper Ermaying Formation of China is correlated with subzone C of the Cynognathus assemblage zone based on the presence of Shansiodon, and it is considered to be late Anisian based on CA-TIMS Uranium-Lead dating. The Cerro de las Cabras Formation is also likely to be of Anisian age, as it is positioned between the radiometrically-dated Río Mendoza Formation (Olenekian) and Potrerillos Formation (Ladinian-Carnian).

== Paleobiota ==
=== Synapsids ===
Synapsids
Genus	Species	Notes	Images
Cynognathus	C. Crateronotus	A cynognathian cynodont	
Diademodon	D. tetragonus	A diademodontid cynodont	
Acratophorus	A. argentinensis	A kannemeyeriid dicynodont	
Pascualgnathus	D. polanskii	A traversodontid cynodont	
Vinceria	V. sp.	A kannemeyeriiform dicynodont	
