= Estuarine turbidity maximum =

An estuarine turbidity maximum, or ETM, is the zone of highest turbidity resulting from turbulent resuspension of sediment and flocculation of particulate matter in an estuary. The turbulence is driven by tidal forces, waves, and density-driven currents that push a salt wedge upstream and beneath outflowing freshwater discharge.
