= Stable isotope composition of amino acids =

Abundance of non-radioactive isotopes in amino acids

The stable isotope composition of amino acids refers to the abundance of heavy and light non-radioactive isotopes of carbon (^{13}C and ^{12}C), nitrogen (^{15}N and ^{14}N), and other elements within these molecules. Amino acids are the building blocks of proteins. They are synthesized from alpha-keto acid precursors that are in turn intermediates of several different pathways in central metabolism. Carbon skeletons from these diverse sources are further modified before transamination, the addition of an amino group that completes amino acid biosynthesis. Bonds to heavy isotopes are stronger than bonds to light isotopes, making reactions involving heavier isotopes proceed slightly slower in most cases. This phenomenon, known as a kinetic isotope effect, gives rise to isotopic differences between reactants and products that can be detected using isotope ratio mass spectrometry. Amino acids are synthesized via a variety of pathways with reactions containing different, unknown isotope effects. Because of this, the ^{13}C content of amino acid carbon skeletons varies considerably between the amino acids. There is also an isotope effect associated with transamination, which is apparent from the abundance of ^{15}N in some amino acids.

Because of these properties, amino acid isotopes record useful information about the organisms that produce them. Variations in metabolism between different taxonomical groups give rise to characteristic patterns of ^{13}C enrichment in their amino acids. This allows the sources of carbon in food webs to be identified. The isotope effect associated with transamination also makes amino acid nitrogen isotopes a useful tool to study the structure of food webs. Repeated transamination by consumers results in a predictable increase in the abundance of ^{15}N as amino acids are transferred up food chains. Together, these application, among others in ecology, demonstrate the utility of stable isotopes as tracers of environmental processes that are difficult to measure directly.

== Isotopic fractionation in reaction networks ==
To explain the wide range of isotopic compositions observed among the amino acids, it is necessary to consider how isotopes are sorted between starting materials, intermediates, and products in reaction networks. Amino acid biosynthesis pathways contain both reversible and irreversible reactions, as well as branch points where one intermediate can react to form two different products. The following examples adapted from Hayes (2001) illustrate the isotopic consequences of these network structures.

=== Linear irreversible network ===
In the following reaction network, A is irreversibly converted to an intermediate B, which irreversibly reacts to form C.

$$\ce{A ->[{\phi_{ab}}][{\delta_b, \alpha_{b/A}}] B->[{\phi_{bc}}][{\delta_c, \alpha_{c/B}}] C}$$

The pools of A, B, and C have delta values defined as δ_{A}, δ_{B}, and δ_{C} respectively. These values are related to the ratio of heavy to light isotopes in each pool, and are the conventional means by which scientists express the isotopic composition of materials. Importantly, δ_{B} is distinct from δ_{b} listed on the diagram, as δ_{b} is the isotopic composition of B produced from A before it mixes with the pool of B. The isotopic compositions of the pools and products are related through fractionation factors that reflect the kinetic isotope effects (KIEs) associated with each reaction. For A → B,

$$\alpha_{b/A} \equiv \frac{\delta_b+1}{\delta_A+1}$$

Rearranging for δ_{b} gives $\delta_b = \alpha_{b/A}\delta_A + \epsilon_{b/A}$ in which $\epsilon_{b/A}\equiv\alpha_{b/A}-1$. In many cases, $\alpha_{b/A}<1$ and $\epsilon_{b/A}<0$. This is consistent with a normal kinetic isotope effect in which the product is slightly depleted in a heavy isotope relative to the reactant. If the isotope effect is small, as is typical for C and N, $\alpha_{b/A}\approx1$ and $\delta_b \approx \delta_A + \epsilon_{b/A}$. From this, we can see that the product produced from A will be depleted by roughly $\epsilon_{b/A}$‰ relative to the starting material.

At steady state, the mass flux $\phi_{ab}$ of material entering pool B must equal the flux $\phi_{bc}$ leaving pool B. In other words, the amounts of heavy and light isotopes entering and exiting the pool must be identical, so $\delta_b = \delta_c$. Since there is no flux of material out of pool C, its delta value is also equal to $\delta_b$. This analysis shows that the end product of a linear, irreversible reaction network has an isotopic composition determined solely by the composition of the starting material and the KIE of the first reaction in the network.

=== Network with branch points ===
Isotopic compositions of the species in the branched reaction network, showing the relationship with f_{C}

At branch points, two or more separate reactions compete for the same reactant. This affects the isotopic composition of all products downstream of the branch point. To illustrate this, consider the network below:

Here, the flux of material into pool B (φ_{AB}) is balanced by two fluxes, one into pool C and the other into pool D (φ_{BC} and φ_{BD} respectively). The mass balance for the heavier isotope in this system is represented by

$$\delta_b\varphi_{AB}=\delta_c\varphi_{BC}+\delta_d\varphi_{BD}$$

Define f_{C} = φ_{BC} / (φ_{BC} + φ_{BD}) = φ_{BC}/φ_{AB} as the fractional yield of C. Dividing through by φ_{AB} gives

$$\delta_b =
\delta_cf_C +
\delta_d(1-f_C)$$

Applying the approximation introduced in the previous section, δ_{b} ≈ δ_{A} + ε_{b/A}. Further, δ_{c} ≈ δ_{B} + ε_{c/B} and δ_{d} ≈ δ_{B} + ε_{d/B}. Substituting these relations into the mass balance and solving for δ_{B} gives

$$\delta_B = \delta_A + \varepsilon_{b/A} - \varepsilon_{d/B} + f_C\left(\varepsilon_{d/B}-\varepsilon_{c/B}\right)$$

The isotopic composition of pool B is clearly dependent on the fractional yield of C. Since there are no fluxes out of pools C or D, δ_{C} = δ_{c}, δ_{D} = δ_{d}. Thus, the isotopic compositions of these pools are offset from δ_{B} by ε_{c/B} and ε_{d/B} respectively. The figure at right summarizes these results.

=== Example ===
Pathway for the synthesis of amino acids with pyruvate as a precursor. "T" represents transamination. Pyruvate can be transaminated directly to produce alanine. It can also be decarboxylated to produce acetyl-CoA. Due to the kinetic isotope effect associated with this reaction, the red carbons in the resulting acetyl groups are depleted in ^{13}C relative to bulk biomass. Carbons in metabolites derived from acetyl-CoA are also colored red. If pyruvate is acetylated once, it can be transaminated after a rearrangement to produce valine. Further acetylation is required to produce leucine, which is consistently depleted in ^{13}C. Valine is sometimes more or less enriched in ^{13}C compared to alanine. The branch point at α-ketoisovalerate could explain this variation. A carbon isotope effect at C-2 (indicated by blue arrows) would be needed for this branch point to affect the isotopic composition of downstream products. This position is the site of transamination to produce valine or acetylation to produce β-isopropylmalate.

There is great variation in the carbon isotope composition of amino acids within a single organism. In cyanobacteria, Macko et al. observed a ~30‰ range in δ^{13}C values amongst the amino acids. Amino acids produced from the same precursors also had widely varying compositions. It is difficult to explain these trends because of limited data on the kinetic isotope effects associated with reactions that synthesize amino acid carbon skeletons. Nevertheless, some insights can be gained by applying the logic above to the reaction networks responsible for amino acid biosynthesis.

Consider the amino acids synthesized from pyruvate. Pyruvate is produced during glycolysis and can be decarboxylated by pyruvate dehydrogenase to generate acetyl groups. These acetyl groups enter the citric acid cycle as acetyl-CoA or can be used to synthesize lipids. There is a large kinetic isotope effect associated with this reaction, so the remaining pyruvate pool becomes enriched in ^{13}C relative to the acetyl groups. This enriched pyruvate can be transaminated to produce alanine. In the experiments by Macko et al., alanine indeed had a δ^{13}C value slightly higher than that of cyanobacterial photosynthate.

Valine is synthesized by the addition of a ^{13}C depleted acetyl group to pyruvate. Consistent with this mechanism, Takano et al. found valine to be depleted in ^{13}C relative to alanine in anaerobic methanotrophic archaea. However, in cyanobacteria, Macko et al. observed a higher δ^{13}C value for valine than alanine. This could be due to the branch point at the intermediate α-ketoisovalerate, which can be transaminated to produce valine or further acetylated to generate leucine. There may be different isotope effects associated with the addition of an amino or acetyl group at position C-2 in α-ketoisovalerate. As discussed above, the isotopic consequences of this branch point would depend on the relative rates of leucine vs valine production.

One would also expect relative depletion of ^{13}C in leucine because its synthesis requires the addition of another isotopically light acetyl group. In Escherichia coli, the carboxyl carbon in leucine (derived from acetyl-CoA) has a δ^{13}C value roughly 13‰ lower than that of the entire molecule. Curiously, the same depletion is not observed in photoautotrophs. Further, there is little consistency in the δ^{13}C of most amino acids between cyanobacteria and eukaryotic photoautotrophs. These discrepancies demonstrate the limits of our understanding of the mechanisms that set amino acid isotopic compositions. Regardless, isotopic variations between different taxa have been used to great effect in ecology.

== Applications ==
=== Tracing nutrient sources in food webs ===
Some amino acids have carbon isotope compositions that reflect the organism that produced them. The x axis is the difference in δ^{13}C between isoleucine and leucine, while the y axis shows this difference for isolecuine and lysine. There are clear clusters of points corresponding to bacteria, fungi, and plants. Figure adapted from.

Amino acids are a key nutrient in ecosystems. Some are essential to animals, meaning that these organisms cannot synthesize them de novo. Instead, animals rely on their diet to acquire these molecules, creating strong interdependencies between animals and organisms with complete amino acid synthesis capabilities. In a study of bacteria and archaea at Antarctica's McMurdo Dry Valleys, the distribution of ^{13}C between their amino acids reflected the biosynthetic pathways employed by these organisms. Autotrophs and heterotrophs had distinct isotopic fingerprints, as did organisms that employed alternatives to the citric acid cycle to ferment or produce acetate. Plants, fungi, and bacteria are also distinguishable by their amino acid carbon isotopes. The compositions of the essential amino acids, which have more complex biosynthetic pathways, are particularly informative. Lysine, isoleucine, leucine, threonine, and valine all had significantly different δ^{13}C values between at least two of these groups. The fungi and bacteria in this study were grown on amino acid-free media to ensure that all the amino acids were synthesized by the organisms of interest. Bacteria and fungi can also scavenge amino acids from the environment, complicating the interpretation of data from field samples. Nevertheless, researchers have successfully used these differences to identify the sources of amino acids in food webs. Terrestrial and marine producers in a mangrove forest had different patterns of ^{13}C enrichment in their amino acids. Fishes from a coral reef with diets containing different carbon sources also had variable amino acid δ^{13}C values. Furthermore, one study observed distinct amino acid isotopic compositions for desert C_{3}, C_{4}, and CAM plants. These applications in diverse ecosystems highlight the versatility of compound-specific amino acid isotope analysis.

=== Placing organisms in food webs ===
Human domination of the biosphere has threatened global biodiversity, with uncertain consequences for ecosystems that provide food, clean air and water, and other valuable ecosystem services. Understanding the impacts of biodiversity loss on ecosystem function requires knowledge of the interactions between organisms within both the same and different positions in a food web (i.e. trophic levels). Food webs can have very complex structures. In many ecosystems, organisms at trophic levels higher than herbivores consume a variable combination of prey and producers, exhibiting different forms of omnivory. The loss of predator species can have a cascading effect on all organisms at lower trophic levels. Networks with more omnivores that consume species at multiple trophic levels may be more resilient to these top-down effects. Together, these factors demonstrate that a food web's structure affects its sensitivity to reductions in biodiversity, highlighting the importance of food web studies. Amino acid isotopes are an important tool used in this field.

The abundance of ^{15}N in some amino acids reflects an organism's position in a food web. This is due to the ways organisms metabolize different amino acids when they are consumed. Trophic amino acids (TrAAs) are first deaminated, meaning that the amino group is removed to produce an alpha-keto acid carbon skeleton. This reaction breaks a C-N bond, causing the amino acid to become more enriched in ^{15}N due to a kinetic isotope effect. For instance, glutamate, a representative TrAA, has a δ^{15}N value that increases by 8‰ with each trophic level. In contrast, the first reaction in the metabolism of source amino acids (SrcAAs) is not deamination. An example is phenylalanine, with is first converted to tyrosine in a reaction that breaks no C-N bonds. Thus, there is little variation in the δ^{15}N values of SrcAAs between trophic levels. Their isotopic composition instead resembles that of the species at the base of the food web. Though these trends are conflated by some environmental effects, they have been used to infer an organism's trophic position.
