= K–Ca dating =

Radiometric dating method used in geochronology

Potassium–calcium dating, abbreviated K–Ca dating, is a radiometric dating method used in geochronology. It is based upon measuring the ratio of a parent isotope of potassium (^{40}K) to a daughter isotope of calcium (^{40}Ca). This form of radioactive decay is accomplished through beta decay.

Calcium is common in many minerals, with ^{40}Ca being the most abundant naturally occurring isotope of calcium (96.94%), so use of this dating method to determine the ratio of daughter calcium produced from parent potassium is generally not practical. However, recent advancements in mass spectrometric techniques [e.g., thermal ionization mass spectrometry (TIMS) and collision-cell inductively-coupled plasma mass spectrometry (CC-ICP-MS)] are allowing radiogenic Ca isotope variations to be measured at unprecedented precisions in an increasing variety of materials, including high Ca minerals (e.g., plagioclase, garnet, clinopyroxene) and aqueous (e.g., seawater and riverine) samples. In earlier studies, this technique was especially useful in minerals with low calcium contents (under 1/50th of the potassium content) so that radiogenic ingrowth of 40-Ca could be more easily quantified. Examples of such minerals include lepidolite, potassium-feldspar, and late-formed muscovite or biotite from pegmatites (preferably older than 60 million years ago). This method is also useful for zircon-poor, felsic-to-intermediate igneous rocks, various metamorphic rocks, and evaporite minerals (i.e. sylvite).

== Method ==
Potassium has three naturally occurring isotopes: stable ^{39}K, ^{41}K and radioactive ^{40}K. ^{40}K exhibits dual decay: through β-decay (E = 1.33 MeV), 89% of ^{40}K decays to ^{40}Ca, and the rest decays to ^{40}Ar via electron capture (E = 1.46 MeV). While ^{40}K comprises only 0.001167% of total potassium mass, ^{40}Ca makes up 96.9821% of total calcium mass; thus, ^{40}K decay leads to significantly greater ^{40}Ca enrichment than any other isotope. The decay constant for the decay to ^{40}Ca is denoted as λ_{β} and equals 4.962×10^{−10} yr^{−1}; the decay constant to ^{40}Ar is denoted as λ_{EC} and equals 5.81×10^{−11} yr^{−1}.

The general equation for the decay time of a radioactive nucleus that decays to a single product is:

$$t = -\lambda \ln\left[\frac{N}{N_0}\right]= -\frac{\ln(2)}{t_{1/2}}  \ln\left[\frac{N}{N_0}\right]$$

Where λ is the decay constant, t_{1/2} is the half-life, N_{0} is the initial concentration of the parent isotope, and N is the final concentration of the parent isotope.

Similarly, the equation for the decay time of a radioactive nucleus that decays to more than one product is:

$$t = -\frac{1}{\lambda_t} \ln\left[\frac{\lambda_t}{\lambda_a}\frac{N}{N_0} + 1\right]$$

Where a is the daughter product of interest, λ_{a} is the decay constant for daughter product a, and λ_{t} is the sum of decay constants for daughter products a and b.

This approach is taken in potassium-calcium dating where argon and calcium are both products of decay and can be expressed as:

$$t = -\frac{1}{\lambda_t} \ln\left[\frac{\lambda_t}{\lambda_\beta}  \frac\ce{Ca^\ast}\ce{K0} + 1\right]$$

Where Ca^{*} is the measured amount of radiogenic ^{40}Ca in terms of parent isotope ^{40}K, and K_{0} is the initial concentration of ^{40}K.

== Age equation ==
Age determination using potassium–calcium dating is best done using the isochron technique. The isochron constructed for Pike's Peak in Colorado and the K/Ca age for the granites in the area were found to be 1041±32 Ma. Rb-Sr dating of the same batholith gave results of 1008±13 Ma, supporting the practicality of this method of dating. For comparison, the isochron method uses non-radiogenic ^{42}Ca to develop an isochron.

The following equation is used in the construction of the isochron plot:

$$t = \frac{1}{\lambda_t} \ln\left(\frac{\ce{Ca} - \ce{Ca0}}{\ce{K} \xi} + 1 \right)$$

- t is time elapsed
- ξ is the branching ratio (= λ_{β} / λ _{total}) = 0.8952
- Ca_{0} is the initial ^{40}Ca/^{42}Ca isotope ratio
- Ca is the ^{40}Ca/^{42}Ca isotope ratio
- K is the ^{40}K/^{42}Ca isotope ratio

== Applications ==
=== Chronological applications ===
This technique's primary application is towards determining the crystallization age of minerals or rocks enriched in potassium and depleted in calcium. Due to the long half-life of ^{40}K (~1.25 billion years), K–Ca dating is most useful on samples older than 100,000 years. Given that the chosen sample has a relatively high current K/Ca ratio, and that the initial concentration of ^{40}Ca can be determined, any error in this initial ^{40}Ca concentration can be considered negligible when determining the sample's age.

K–Ca dating is not a common radioactive dating method for metamorphic rocks. However, this system is considered more stable than both the K-Ar and Rb-Sr dating methods. This fact, combined with advances in precision of Ca mass spectrometry, makes K–Ca dating a viable option for igneous and metamorphic rocks containing little to no zircon.

Potassium-calcium dating is especially useful for diagenetic minerals and marine sediments, which are both assumed to have had the same initial calcium isotopic composition as Earth's seawater at the time of their formation. As such, being able to assume the initial ^{40}Ca/^{42}Ca ratio as a constant, this dating method proves particularly fruitful for these respective samples.

=== Non-chronological applications ===
Aside from radioactive dating, the K-Ca system is the only isotopic system capable of detecting elemental signatures in magmatic processes. Normalizing the ^{40}Ca/^{42}Ca ratio to non-radioactive isotopes (^{42}Ca/^{44}Ca), it was found that the isotopic composition of calcium was similar across meteorites, lunar samples, and Earth's mantle.

== Advantages & disadvantages ==
=== Disadvantages ===
The primary disadvantage to K–Ca dating is the abundance of calcium in most minerals; this dating method cannot be used on minerals with a high preexisting calcium content, as the radioactively added calcium will increase calcium abundance in the sample only very slightly. As such, K–Ca dating is effective only in circumstances where K/Ca>50 (in a potassium-enriched, calcium-depleted sample). Examples of such minerals include lepidolite, potassium-feldspar, and late-formed muscovite or biotite from pegmatites (preferably older than 60 million years ago). This method is also useful for zircon-poor, felsic-to-intermediate igneous rocks, various metamorphic rocks, and evaporite minerals (i.e. sylvite).

Another disadvantage to K–Ca dating is that the isotopic composition of calcium (^{40}Ca compared to ^{42}Ca) is difficult to determine using mass spectrometry. Calcium is not easily ionized using a thermoionic source, and tends to isotopically fractionate during ionization. As such, this dating method does not yield satisfactory results unless performed with extremely high precision. Until recently, K–Ca dating was not considered useful for samples younger than the Precambrian, with extremely depleted Ca to K ratios.

=== Advantages ===
However, if used effectively on the aforementioned minerals, the K–Ca dating method provides high-precision dating comparable to other isotopic dating methods. It is also most effective, comparatively, at providing major element abundances for crustal magma sources, if used with high precision.

== See also ==
- K–Ar dating
- Rb-Sr dating
