= Isoscape =

Map of isotope distributions

An isoscape is a map of isotope distributions. It is a spatially explicit prediction of elemental isotope ratios (δ) that is produced by executing process-level models of elemental isotope fractionation or distribution in a geographic information system (GIS).

The word isoscape is derived from "isotope landscape" and was coined by Jason B. West.

Isoscapes of hydrogen, carbon, oxygen, nitrogen, strontium and sulfur have been used to answer scientific or forensic questions regarding the sources, partitioning, or provenance of natural and synthetic materials or organisms via their isotopic signatures. These include questions about Earth's element cycles, human water use, climate, archaeological reconstructions, forensic science, pollution, organismal migration patterns and food web dynamics. Isoscapes of hydrogen and oxygen isotopes, modeling precipitation, surface water, groundwater, and tap water have been developed to better understand the water cycle at regional to global scales. Isoscapes of carbon and nitrogen isotopes have also been developed terrestrially and oceanographically to help understand ecosystem dynamics.

== Marine Isoscapes ==
=== Carbon Isoscapes ===
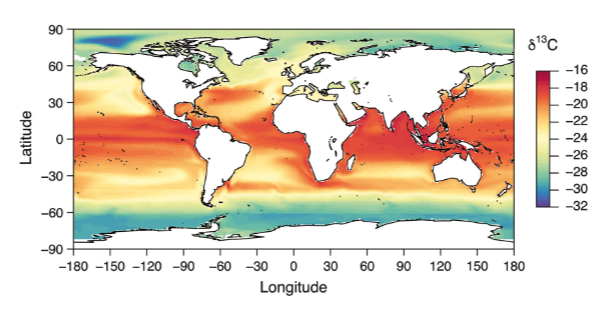
Marine carbon isoscape based on carbon isotope ratios in phytoplankton

Scientists are able to map carbon isotope ratios (δ^{13}C) due to the predictable sorting of two stable isotopes of carbon: ^{13}C and ^{12}C. This sorting is known as isotope fractionation. In the ocean, δ^{13}C changes due to many environmental factors including water temperature, upwelling of deep ocean water, diffusion of CO_{2} from the air into the ocean and the burning of fossil fuels. Carbon fixation by primary producers also greatly influences δ^{13}C at the oceans surface. Different groups of primary producers such as phytoplankton and macroalgae have different strategies for fixing carbon during photosynthesis and can further alter δ^{13}C. As a result carbon isoscapes in the ocean largely reflect global patterns of temperature and primary production.

Since δ^{13}C is influenced by so many factors, isoscapes are powerful for visualizing spatial or temporal patterns and provide baseline context for applications of stable isotope analysis in marine systems. Carbon isoscapes can be used in conjunction with stable isotope analysis of marine consumers or apex predators to determine the relative contributions of different primary producers to a food web or infer migration patterns of a consumer between isotopically distinct locations.

=== Nitrogen Isoscapes ===
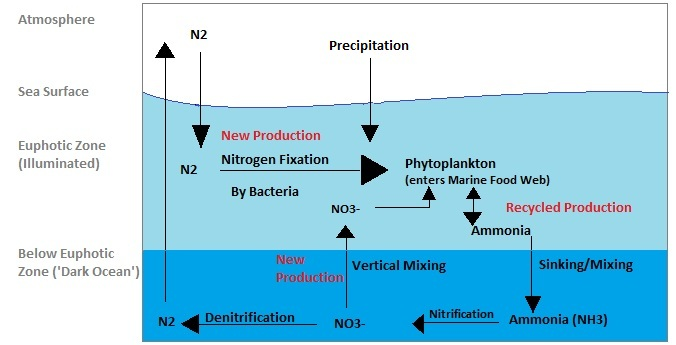
Marine nitrogen cycle

Like carbon, scientists are able to map nitrogen isotope ratios (δ^{15}N) due to the fractionation of two stable isotopes of nitrogen: ^{14}N and ^{15}N. Marine nitrogen is sourced from diffusion of N_{2} from the air into the ocean, freshwater run-off from continents including fertilizers and other land-based nutrients, and nitrogen fixation by primary producers like cyanobacteria which can all influence the baseline δ^{15}N of the ocean in a given area. From there, nitrogen fractionation is mainly controlled through biological processes that utilize nitrogen, further detailed in the marine nitrogen cycle. For example the process of denitrification and the use of NH4+ (ammonia), NO2-, and NO3- (nitrate) by marine organisms alters the δ^{15}N in the water. As a result, δ^{15}N patterns in the ocean reflect areas where nitrogen is being heavily altered through denitrification or by organismal use within a food web. Seasonality influencing primary productivity also plays a role in δ^{15}N patterns at certain times of the year. For an example of marine nitrogen isoscape....

Due to the large role of biological reactions on the fractionation of nitrogen, δ^{15}N isoscapes provide valuable information for stable isotope analysis in marine ecology. Nitrogen isoscapes provide spatial and temporal δ^{15}N baselines that can be used to inform food web studies. Due to the alteration of nitrogen as it is passed up the food chain, stable isotope analysis of marine consumers can be paired with δ^{15}N isoscapes to place a consumer at a trophic level within a food web.

== See also ==
- Isotopic signature
- Isotope analysis
- Isotope geochemistry
- Stable isotope composition of amino acids
