= Sensitive high-resolution ion microprobe =

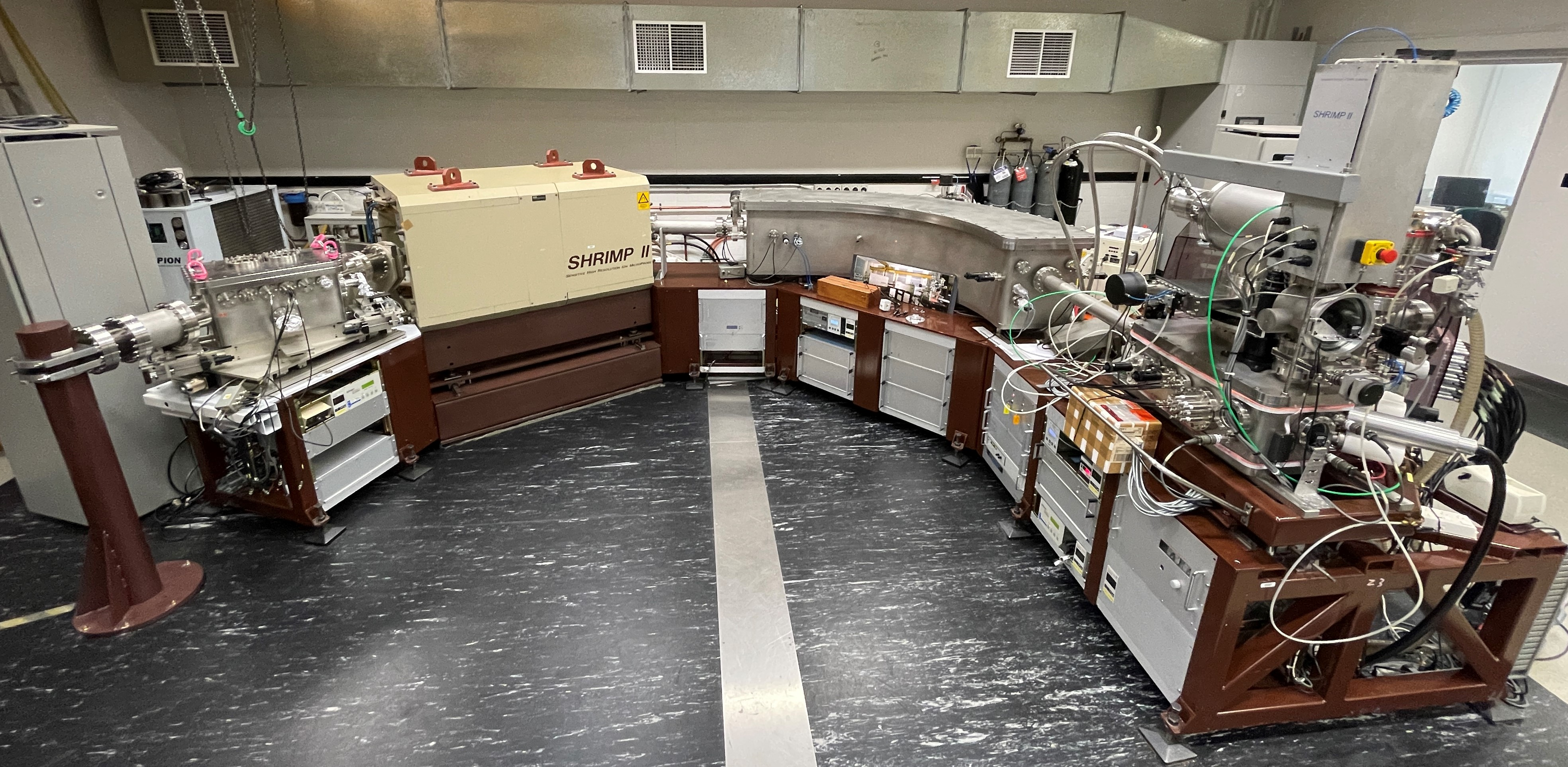
SHRIMP II at Research School of Earth Sciences, Australian National University, Australia

The sensitive high-resolution ion microprobe (also sensitive high mass-resolution ion microprobe or SHRIMP) is a large-diameter, double-focusing secondary ion mass spectrometer (SIMS) sector instrument that was produced by Australian Scientific Instruments in Canberra, Australia and now has been taken over by Chinese company Dunyi Technology Development Co. (DTDC) in Beijing. Similar to the IMS 1270-1280-1300 large-geometry ion microprobes produced by CAMECA, Gennevilliers, France and like other SIMS instruments, the SHRIMP microprobe bombards a sample under vacuum with a beam of primary ions that sputters secondary ions that are focused, filtered, and measured according to their energy and mass.

The SHRIMP is primarily used for geological and geochemical applications. It can measure the isotopic and elemental abundances in minerals at a 10 to 30 μm-diameter scale and with a depth resolution of 1–5 μm. Thus, SIMS method is well-suited for the analysis of complex minerals, as often found in metamorphic terrains, some igneous rocks, and for relatively rapid analysis of statistical valid sets of detrital minerals from sedimentary rocks. The most common application of the instrument is in uranium–thorium–lead geochronology, although the SHRIMP can be used to measure some other isotope ratio measurements (e.g., δ^{7}Li or δ^{11}B) and trace element abundances.

== History and scientific impact ==
The SHRIMP originated in 1973 with a proposal by Prof. Bill Compston, trying to build an ion microprobe at the Research School of Earth Sciences of the Australian National University that exceeded the sensitivity and resolution of ion probes available at the time in order to analyse individual mineral grains. Optic designer Steve Clement based the prototype instrument (now referred to as 'SHRIMP-I') on a design by Matsuda which minimised aberrations in transmitting ions through the various sectors. The instrument was built from 1975 and 1977 with testing and redesigning from 1978. The first successful geological applications occurred in 1980.

The first major scientific impact was the discovery of Hadean (>4000 million year old) zircon grains at Mt. Narryer in Western Australia and then later at the nearby Jack Hills. These results and the SHRIMP analytical method itself were initially questioned but subsequent conventional analysis were partially confirmed. SHRIMP-I also pioneered ion microprobe studies of titanium, hafnium and sulfur isotopic systems.

Growing interest from commercial companies and other academic research groups, notably Prof. John de Laeter of Curtin University (Perth, Western Australia), led to the project in 1989 to build a commercial version of the instrument, the SHRIMP-II, in association with ANUTECH, the Australian National University's commercial arm. Refined ion optic designs in the mid-1990s prompted development and construction of the SHRIMP-RG (Reverse Geometry) with improved mass resolution. Further advances in design have also led to multiple ion collection systems (already introduced in the market by a French company years before), negative-ion stable isotope measurements and on-going work in developing a dedicated instrument for light stable isotopes.

Fifteen SHRIMP instruments have now been installed around the world and SHRIMP results have been reported in more than 2000 peer reviewed scientific papers. SHRIMP is an important tool for understanding early Earth history having analysed some of the oldest terrestrial material including the Acasta Gneiss and further extending the age of zircons from the Jack Hills and the oldest impact crater on the planet. Other significant milestones include the first U/Pb ages for lunar zircon and Martian apatite dating. More recent uses include the determination of Ordovician sea surface temperature, the timing of snowball Earth events and development of stable isotope techniques.

== Design and operation ==

Schematic diagram of a SHRIMP instrument illustrating the ion beam path. After Figure 4, Williams, 1998.

=== Primary column ===
In a typical U–Pb geochronology analytical mode, a beam of (O_{2})^{1−} primary ions are produced from a high-purity oxygen gas discharge in the hollow Ni cathode of a duoplasmatron. The ions are extracted from the plasma and accelerated at 10 kV. The primary column uses Köhler illumination to produce a uniform ion density across the target spot. The spot diameter can vary from ~5 μm to over 30 μm as required. Typical ion beam density on the sample is ~10 pA/μm^{2} and an analysis of 15–20 minutes creates an ablation pit of less than 1 μm.

=== Sample chamber ===
The primary beam is 45° incident to the plane of the sample surface with secondary ions extracted at 90° and accelerated at 10 kV. Three quadrupole lenses focus the secondary ions onto a source slit and the design aims to maximise transmission of ions rather than preserving an ion image unlike other ion probe designs. A Schwarzschild objective lens provides reflected-light direct microscopic viewing of the sample during analysis.

=== Electrostatic analyzer ===
The secondary ions are filtered and focussed according to their kinetic energy by a 1272 mm radius 90° electrostatic sector. A mechanically-operated slit provides fine-tuning of the energy spectrum transmitted into the magnetic sector and an electrostatic quadrupole lens is used to reduce aberrations in transmitting the ions to the magnetic sector.

=== Magnetic sector ===
The electromagnet has a 1000 mm radius through 72.5° to focus the secondary ions according to their mass/charge ratio according to the principles of the Lorentz force. Essentially, the path of a less massive ion will have a greater curvature through the magnetic field than the path of a more massive ion. Thus, altering the current in the electromagnet focuses a particular mass species at the detector.

=== Detectors ===
The ions pass through a collector slit in the focal plane of the magnetic sector and the collector assembly can be moved along an axis to optimise the focus of a given isotopic species. In typical U-Pb zircon analysis, a single secondary electron multiplier is used for ion counting.

=== Vacuum system ===
Turbomolecular pumps evacuate the entire beam path of the SHRIMP to maximise transmission and reduce contamination. The sample chamber also employs a cryopump to trap contaminants, especially water. Typical pressures inside the SHRIMP are between ~7 × 10^{−9} mbar in the detector and ~1 × 10^{−6} mbar in the primary column (with oxygen duoplasmatron source).

=== Mass resolution and sensitivity ===
In normal operations, the SHRIMP achieves mass resolution of 5000 with sensitivity >20 counts/sec/ppm/nA for lead from zircon.

== Applications ==
=== Isotope dating ===
For U-Th-Pb geochronology a beam of primary ions (O_{2})^{1−} are accelerated and collimated towards the target where it sputters "secondary" ions from the sample. These secondary ions are accelerated along the instrument where the various isotopes of uranium, lead and thorium are measured successively, along with reference peaks for Zr_{2}O^{+}, ThO^{+} and UO^{+}. Since the sputtering yield differs between ion species and relative sputtering yield increases or decreases with time depending on the ion species (due to increasing crater depth, charging effects and other factors), the measured relative isotopic abundances do not relate to the real relative isotopic abundances in the target. Corrections are determined by analysing unknowns and reference material (matrix-matched material of known isotopic composition), and determining an analytical-session specific calibration factor.

== SHRIMP instruments around the world ==
Instrument number	Institution	Location	SHRIMP model	Year of commissioning
1	Australian National University	Canberra, Australia	I	1980 (retired 2011)
2	Australian National University	Canberra, Australia	II/mc	1992
3	Curtin University of Technology	Perth, Australia	II	1993 (moved to Uni Queensland 2022)
4	Geological Survey of Canada	Ottawa, Canada	II	1995
5	Hiroshima University	Hiroshima, Japan	IIe	1996
6	Australian National University	Canberra, Australia	RG	1998
7	USGS and Stanford University	Stanford, United States	RG	1998
8	National Institute of Polar Research	Tokyo, Japan	II	1999
9	Chinese Academy of Geological Sciences	Beijing, China	II	2001
10	All Russian Geological Research Institute	St. Petersburg, Russia	II/mc	2003
11	Curtin University	Perth, Australia	II/mc	2003
12	Geoscience Australia	Canberra, Australia	IIe	2008
13	Korea Basic Science Institute	Cheongju, South Korea	IIe/mc	2009
14	University of São Paulo	São Paulo, Brazil	II/mc	2010
15	University of Granada	Granada, Spain	IIe/mc	2011
16	Australian National University	Canberra	SI/mc	2012
17	Chinese Academy of Geological Sciences	Beijing, China	IIe/mc	2013
18	National Institute of Advanced Industrial Science and Technology	Tsukuba, Japan	IIe/amc	2013
19	Polish Geological Institute - National Research Institute	Warsaw, Poland	IIe/mc	2014
20	National Institute of Polar Research	Tokyo, Japan	IIe/amc	2014
21	Shandong Institute of Geological Sciences	Jinan, China	V	2023
