= Thermal ionization mass spectrometry =

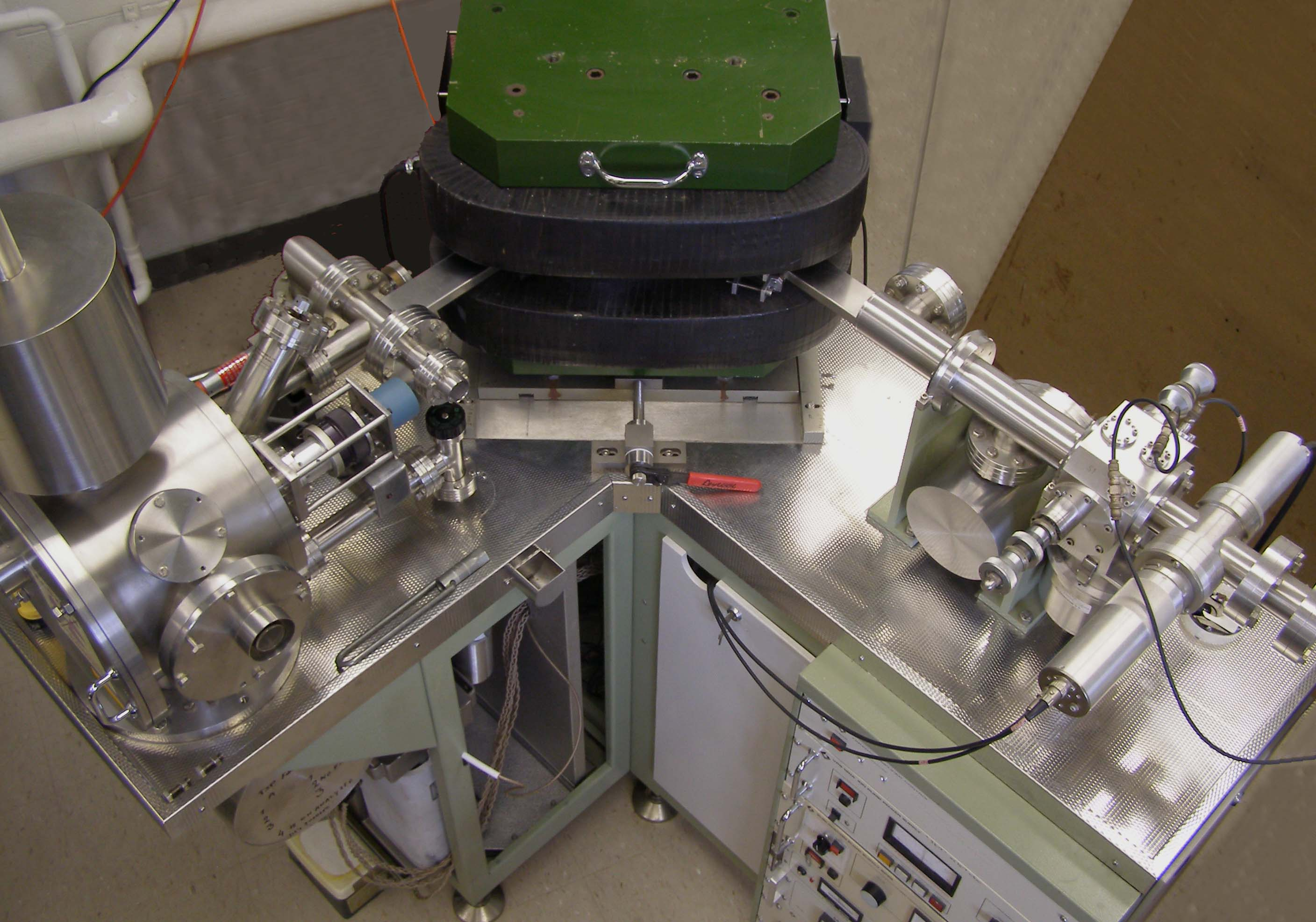
Thermal ionization mass spectrometer. Vacuum chamber on the left, electromagnet in the center, and ions detector on the right are visible.

Thermal ionization mass spectrometry (TIMS), also known as surface ionization, is a highly sensitive isotope mass spectrometry characterization technique. The isotopic ratios of radionuclides are used to get an accurate measurement for the elemental analysis of a sample. Singly charged ions of the sample are formed by the thermal ionization effect. A chemically purified liquid sample is placed on a metal filament which is then heated to evaporate the solvent. The removal of an electron from the purified sample is consequently achieved by heating the filament enough to release an electron, which then ionizes the atoms of the sample. TIMS utilizes a magnetic sector mass analyzer to separate the ions based on their mass to charge ratio. The ions gain velocity by an electrical potential gradient and are focused into a beam by electrostatic lenses. The ion beam then passes through the magnetic field of the electromagnet where it is partitioned into separate ion beams based on the ion's mass/charge ratio. These mass-resolved beams are directed into a detector where it is converted into voltage. The voltage detected is then used to calculate the isotopic ratio.

== Ionization source ==
The filaments used are made from tantalum (Ta), tungsten (W), platinum (Pt) or rhenium (Re). Conventionally, there are two filaments used in TIMS. One filament is for the sample and is called the sample filament. The liquid sample is placed on the sample filament which is then evaporated. Subsequently, these evaporated analytes land on the other filament, also known as the ionization filament, where it is ionized.

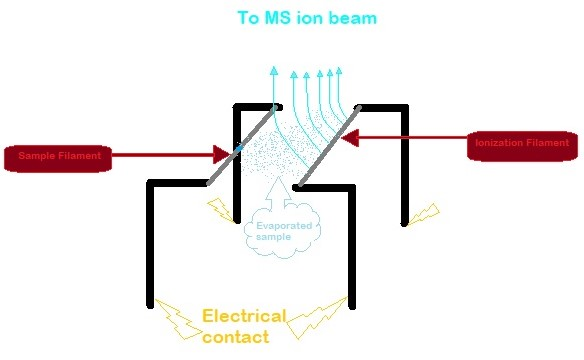
Two filaments in thermal ionization mass spectrometry

The single filament method is also possible. Once the sample evaporates, the analytes can settle back down onto the same filament to get ionized.

The use of a triple filament or multifilament set-up improves ionization efficiency and provides the rate of evaporation and ionization to be controlled separately.

Filaments need to be loaded with activators. An activator represses the evaporation of the desired element and can either increase or decrease the ionization potential of the filament. This results in high ionization efficiency and a higher total yield. The most common activator is silica gel/phosphoric acid for Pb.

The filaments are in a vacuum that can reach temperatures anywhere from 400-2300°C. In order to prevent any damage to the filaments, they are firmly fixed onto a carousel-like sample turret which normally has 10 to 20 filament assemblies. The evaporation process is usually conducted at relatively low temperatures in exchange for long-lasting signals and minor isotopic fractionation. The ionization part requires high temperatures to ensure good ionization efficiency.

The ions emitted have low spatial and energetic spread which makes a single-focusing magnetic sector mass analyzer or quadrupoles suitable. The most common detectors used for TIMS is Faraday cup, Daly detector, and electron multiplier. Customarily, TI ion sources are assembled with multicollector (MC) systems.

== Thermal ionization mechanism ==
When the hot filament heats the liquid sample, the Fermi levels within the sample reaches parity with that of the metal. In turn, this allows for an electron to tunnel from the sample to the metal filament. As a result, positive ions are formed from the sample that lost an electron. This transferring of electrons also result in the formation of negative ions. Subsequently, there are two types of thermal ionizations. One is positive thermal ionization (P-TI) and the second is negative thermal ionization (N-TI). The production of ions is parameterized by the Saha ionization equation or the Saha-Langmuir equation.

== Isotope ratio measurement ==
The relative abundances of different isotopes are then used to describe the chemical fractionation of different isotopes, travel in different reservoirs of non-radiogenic isotopes, and age or origins of solar system objects by the presence of radiogenic daughter isotopes.

Elemental analysis is a predominant application of TIMS as it gives reliable isotopic ratios. Following the trend of decreasing ionization energy, elements located towards the bottom left of the periodic table are viable for TIMS. In addition, the high electron affinity seen towards the upper right of the periodic table makes these nonmetals excellent candidates. The technique is used extensively in isotope geochemistry, geochronology, and in cosmochemistry.

Quantitative isotope ratio techniques include isotope dilution thermal ionization mass spectrometry (ID-TIMS) and chemical abrasion thermal ionization mass spectrometry (CA-TIMS).

Isotope dilution method is used because the signal intensity in TIMS isn't proportional to the amount that is placed into TIMS.

For age dating, mass spectrometers with magnetic sectors have better precision than a quadrupole mass spectrometer or quadrupole mass analyzer. Inductively coupled plasma-quadrupole mass spectrometers allows for an even higher precision of detecting the change of isotopic ratios by radioactive decay. The more precision means the higher resolution in age dating.

== See also ==
- Isotope-ratio mass spectrometry
