= Sector mass spectrometer =

Class of mass spectrometer

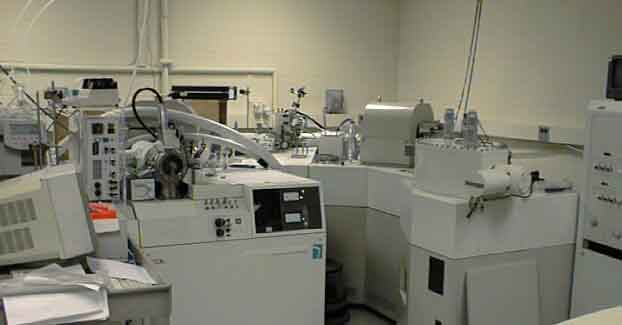
A five sector mass spectrometer

A sector instrument is a general term for a class of mass spectrometer that uses a static electric (E) or magnetic (B) sector or some combination of the two (separately in space) as a mass analyzer. Popular combinations of these sectors have been the EB, BE (of so-called reverse geometry), three-sector BEB and four-sector EBEB (electric-magnetic-electric-magnetic) instruments. Most modern sector instruments are double-focusing instruments (first developed by Francis William Aston, Arthur Jeffrey Dempster, Kenneth Bainbridge and Josef Mattauch in 1936) in that they focus the ion beams both in direction and velocity.

== Theory ==
The behavior of ions in a homogeneous, linear, static electric or magnetic field (separately) as is found in a sector instrument is simple. The physics are described by a single equation called the Lorentz force law. This equation is the fundamental equation of all mass spectrometric techniques and applies in non-linear, non-homogeneous cases too and is an important equation in the field of electrodynamics in general.

$$\mathbf{F} = q (\mathbf{E} + \mathbf{v} \times \mathbf{B}),$$

where E is the electric field strength, B is the magnetic field induction, q is the charge of the particle, v is its current velocity (expressed as a vector), and × is the cross product.

So the force on an ion in a linear homogenous electric field (an electric sector) is:

$$F=qE\,$$,

in the direction of the electric field, with positive ions and opposite that with negative ions.

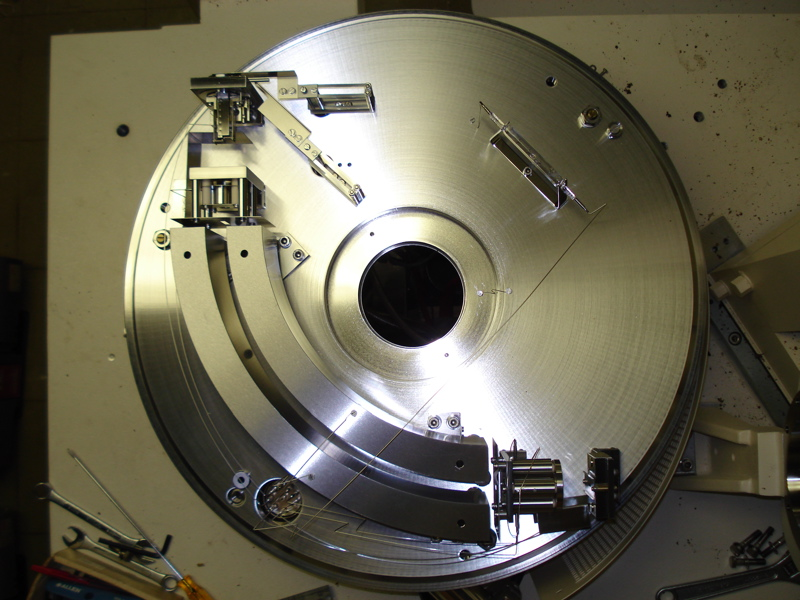
Electric sector from a Finnigan MAT mass spectrometer (vacuum chamber housing removed)

The force is only dependent on the charge and electric field strength. The lighter ions will be deflected more and heavier ions less due to the difference in inertia and the ions will physically separate from each other in space into distinct beams of ions as they exit the electric sector.

And the force on an ion in a linear homogenous magnetic field (a magnetic sector) is:

$$F=qvB\,$$,

perpendicular to both the magnetic field and the velocity vector of the ion itself, in the direction determined by the right-hand rule of cross products and the sign of the charge.

The force in the magnetic sector is complicated by the velocity dependence but with the right conditions (uniform velocity for example) ions of different masses will separate physically in space into different beams as with the electric sector.

== Classic geometries ==
These are some of the classic geometries from mass spectrographs which are often used to distinguish different types of sector arrangements, although most current instruments do not fit precisely into any of these categories as the designs have evolved further.

=== Bainbridge–Jordan ===
The sector instrument geometry consists of a 127.30° $\left (\frac{\pi}{\sqrt{2}} \right)$ electric sector without an initial drift length followed by a 60° magnetic sector with the same direction of curvature. Sometimes called a "Bainbridge mass spectrometer," this configuration is often used to determine isotopic masses. A beam of positive particles is produced from the isotope under study. The beam is subject to the combined action of perpendicular electric and magnetic fields. Since the forces due to these two fields are equal and opposite when the particles have a velocity given by

$$v=E/B\,$$

they do not experience a resultant force; they pass freely through a slit, and are then subject to another magnetic field, transversing a semi-circular path and striking a photographic plate. The mass of the isotope is determined through subsequent calculation.

=== Mattauch–Herzog ===
The Mattauch–Herzog geometry consists of a 31.82° ($\pi / 4\sqrt{2}$ radians) electric sector, a drift length which is followed by a 90° magnetic sector of opposite curvature direction. The entry of the ions sorted primarily by charge into the magnetic field produces an energy focussing effect and much higher transmission than a standard energy filter. This geometry is often used in applications with a high energy spread in the ions produced where sensitivity is nonetheless required, such as spark source mass spectrometry (SSMS) and secondary ion mass spectrometry (SIMS). The advantage of this geometry over the Nier–Johnson geometry is that the ions of different masses are all focused onto the same flat plane. This allows the use of a photographic plate or other flat detector array.

=== Nier–Johnson ===
The Nier–Johnson geometry consists of a 90° electric sector, a long intermediate drift length and a 60° magnetic sector of the same curvature direction.

=== Hinterberger–Konig ===
The Hinterberger–Konig geometry consists of a 42.43° electric sector, a long intermediate drift length and a 130° magnetic sector of the same curvature direction.

=== Takeshita ===
The Takeshita geometry consists of a 54.43° electric sector, and short drift length, a second electric sector of the same curvature direction followed by another drift length before a 180° magnetic sector of opposite curvature direction.

=== Matsuda ===
The Matsuda geometry consists of an 85° electric sector, a quadrupole lens and a 72.5° magnetic sector of the same curvature direction. This geometry is used in the SHRIMP and Panorama (gas source, high-resolution, multicollector to measure isotopologues in geochemistry).

== See also ==
- Mass-analyzed ion kinetic energy spectrometry
- Charge remote fragmentation
- Kenneth Bainbridge
- Alfred O. C. Nier
