= Uranium–lead dating =

Type of radiometric dating

Uranium–lead dating, abbreviated U–Pb dating, is one of the oldest and most refined of the radiometric dating schemes. It can be used to date rocks that formed and crystallised from about 1 million years to over 4.5 billion years ago with routine precisions in the 0.1–1 percent range.

The method is usually applied to zircon. This mineral incorporates uranium and thorium atoms into its crystal structure, but strongly rejects lead when forming. As a result, newly-formed zircon crystals will contain no lead, meaning that any lead found in the mineral is radiogenic. Since the exact rate at which uranium decays into lead is known, the current ratio of lead to uranium in a sample of the mineral can be used to reliably determine its age.

The method relies on two separate decay chains, the uranium series from ^{238}U to ^{206}Pb, with a half-life of 4.47 billion years and the actinium series from ^{235}U to ^{207}Pb, with a half-life of 710 million years.

== Decay routes ==
Uranium decays to lead via a series of alpha and beta decays, in which ^{238}U and its daughter nuclides undergo a total of eight alpha and six beta decays, whereas ^{235}U and its daughters only experience seven alpha and four beta decays.

The existence of two 'parallel' uranium–lead decay routes (^{238}U to ^{206}Pb and ^{235}U to ^{207}Pb) leads to multiple feasible dating techniques within the overall U–Pb system. The term U–Pb dating normally implies the coupled use of both decay schemes in the 'concordia diagram' (see below).

However, use of a single decay scheme (usually ^{238}U to ^{206}Pb) leads to the U–Pb isochron dating method, analogous to the rubidium–strontium dating method.

Finally, ages can also be determined from the U–Pb system by analysis of Pb isotope ratios alone. This is termed the lead–lead dating method. Clair Cameron Patterson, an American geochemist who pioneered studies of uranium–lead radiometric dating methods, used it to obtain one of the earliest estimates of the age of the Earth in 1956 to be 4.550Gy ± 70My; a figure that has remained largely unchallenged since.

== Mineralogy ==
Although zircon (ZrSiO_{4}) is most commonly used, other minerals such as monazite (see: monazite geochronology), titanite, and baddeleyite can also be used.

Where crystals such as zircon with uranium and thorium inclusions cannot be obtained, uranium–lead dating techniques have also been applied to other minerals such as calcite / aragonite and other carbonate minerals. These types of minerals often produce lower-precision ages than igneous and metamorphic minerals traditionally used for age dating, but are more commonly available in the geologic record.

== Mechanism ==
During the alpha decay steps, the zircon crystal experiences radiation damage, associated with each alpha decay. This damage is most concentrated around the parent isotope (U and Th), expelling the daughter isotope (Pb) from its original position in the zircon lattice.

In areas with a high concentration of the parent isotope, damage to the crystal lattice is quite extensive, and will often interconnect to form a network of radiation damaged areas. Fission tracks and micro-cracks within the crystal will further extend this radiation damage network.

These fission tracks act as conduits deep within the crystal, providing a method of transport to facilitate the leaching of lead isotopes from the zircon crystal.

== Computation ==
Under conditions where no lead loss or gain from the outside environment has occurred, the age of the zircon can be calculated by assuming exponential decay of uranium. That is

$$N_{\mathrm{n}} = N_{\mathrm{o}} e^{-\lambda t} \,$$

where

- $N_{\mathrm{n}} = \mathrm{U}$ is the number of uranium atoms measured now.
- $N_{\mathrm{o}}$ is the number of uranium atoms originally - equal to the sum of uranium and lead atoms $\mathrm{U} + \mathrm{Pb}$ measured now.
- $\lambda = \lambda_\mathrm{U}$ is the decay rate of Uranium.
- $t$ is the age of the zircon, which one wants to determine.

This gives

$$\mathrm{U} = \left( \mathrm{U} + \mathrm{Pb} \right) e^{-\lambda_\mathrm{U} t} ,$$

which can be written as

$${{\mathrm{Pb}}\over{\mathrm{U}}} = e^{\lambda_\mathrm{U} t} - 1.$$

The more commonly used decay chains of Uranium and Lead gives the following equations:

| ${{^\text{206}\,\!\text{Pb}^*}\over{^\text{238}\,\!\text{U}}}=e^{\lambda_{238}t}-1,$ | 1 |

| ${{^\text{207}\,\!\text{Pb}^*}\over{^\text{235}\,\!\text{U}}}=e^{\lambda_{235}t}-1.$ | 2 |

(The notation $\text{Pb}^*$, sometimes used in this context, refers to radiogenic lead. For unaltered zircon, the original lead content can be assumed to be zero, and the notation can be ignored.) These are said to yield concordant ages (t from each equation 1 and 2). It is these concordant ages, plotted over a series of time intervals, that result in the concordant line.

Loss (leakage) of lead from the sample will result in a discrepancy in the ages determined by each decay scheme. This effect is referred to as discordance and is demonstrated in Figure 1. If a series of zircon samples has lost different amounts of lead, the samples generate a discordant line. The upper intercept of the concordia and the discordia line will reflect the original age of formation, while the lower intercept will reflect the age of the event that led to open system behavior and therefore the lead loss; although there has been some disagreement regarding the meaning of the lower intercept ages.

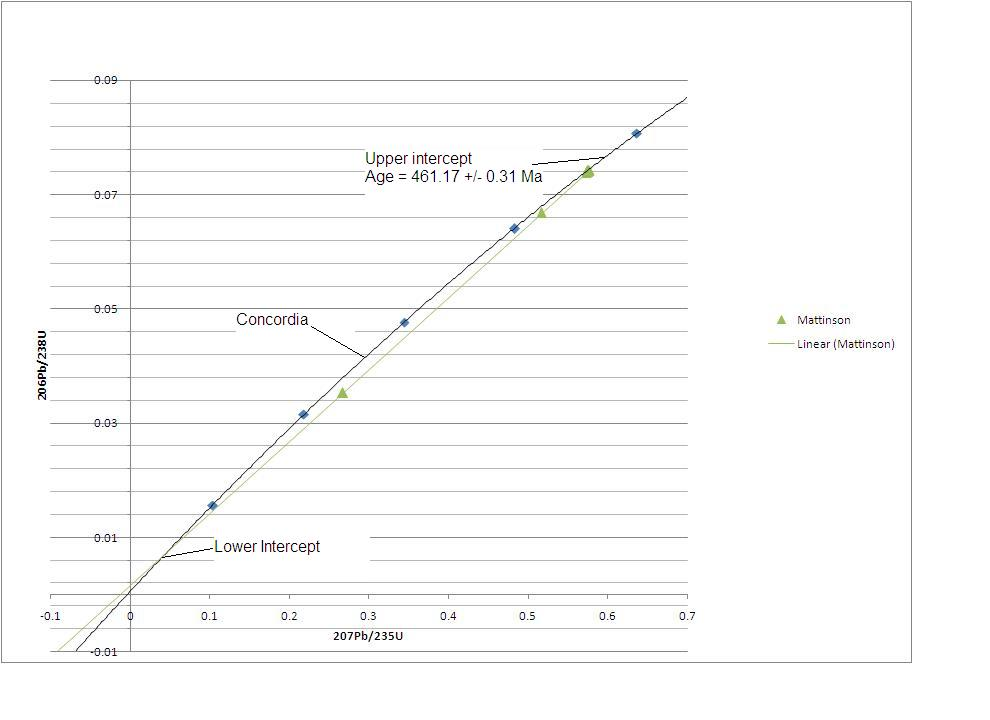
Figure 1: Concordia diagram for data published by Mattinson for zircon samples from Klamath Mountains in Northern California. Ages for the concordia increase in increments of 100 million years.

Undamaged zircon retains the lead generated by radioactive decay of uranium and thorium up to very high temperatures (about 900 °C), though accumulated radiation damage within zones of very high uranium can lower this temperature substantially. Zircon is very chemically inert and resistant to mechanical weathering – a mixed blessing for geochronologists, as zones or even whole crystals can survive melting of their parent rock with their original uranium–lead age intact. Thus, zircon crystals with prolonged and complicated histories can contain zones of dramatically different ages (usually with the oldest zone forming the core, and the youngest zone forming the rim of the crystal), and so are said to demonstrate "inherited characteristics". Unraveling such complexities (which can also exist within other minerals, depending on their maximum lead-retention temperature) generally requires in situ micro-beam analysis using, for example, ion microprobe (SIMS), or laser ICP-MS.

== Lead correction ==
For U-Pb isotope ratio's to give a age with geological significance it is important to take into account how much of the measured lead isotopes originate from the uranium that has decayed in the mineral since formation. Initial lead Pb_{i} or Pb_{0} is lead that has been in the mineral since formation. Common lead Pb_{c} refers to all lead that did not form from uranium decay in the mineral. Notably Pb_{c} also includes lead measured that originates from lab contamination.

BSE image of complex zircon showing a core, rim, fractures and fluid alteration with legend and scale. Zircon originates from a metagranitoid in Bergslagen, Sweden.

=== Sources of initial lead ===
Zircons have the tendency to reject lead during crystalisation while uranium can substitute zirconium. However lead can still enter or leave zircons through for example (partial)metamorphic reset, inclusions, cracks or fluid alterations. Because this lead can influence the final U/Pb ratios it is common for every zircon to be studied using backscatter electron imaging that can reveal most alterations.

Other minerals used for uranium lead dating can contain lead from the start such as monazite, titanite and apatite. The uranium, thorium and lead content can vary significantly between and within individual crystals.

=== Lead correction ===
When there is initial lead in the system there are several techniques to mitigate this.

- Tera-wasserburg Concordia diagram - A type of Concordia diagram where ^{207}Pb/^{206}Pb is plotted against ^{238}U/^{206}Pb. The advantage of plotting the lead/lead ratio is that when a regression is done of a sample population not only an intercept age is given but also a calculated Pb_{i} ratio. This combines the strength of the Concordia diagram with the Isochron method.
- Isochron intercept age - This method can be used when there is a variety of uranium and lead content in the data. The isochron is a line through the datapoints with high U/Pb and low U/Pb giving an Pb_{i} specific to that sample that intersect to an event age.
- Initial lead estimation based on Stacey-Kramer model - If there is insufficient data or if the data is not spread out enough for a regression to be attempted to calculate the age using an estimation of the initial lead ratio. Stacey and kramer made a two-stage model of how this ratio changed during the history of the earth. To use this model it is necessary to estimate the rough age based on the surrounding geology and (bio)stratigraphy.
