= List of the Mesozoic life of North Carolina =

This list of the Mesozoic life of North Carolina contains the various prehistoric life-forms whose fossilized remains have been reported from within the US state of North Carolina and are between 252.17 and 66 million years of age.

== A ==
- Acesta
- †Achrostichites – or unidentified comparable form
  - †Achrostichites linnaeafolius
- Acirsa
- †Acutostrea
  - †Acutostrea plumosa
- †Adocus
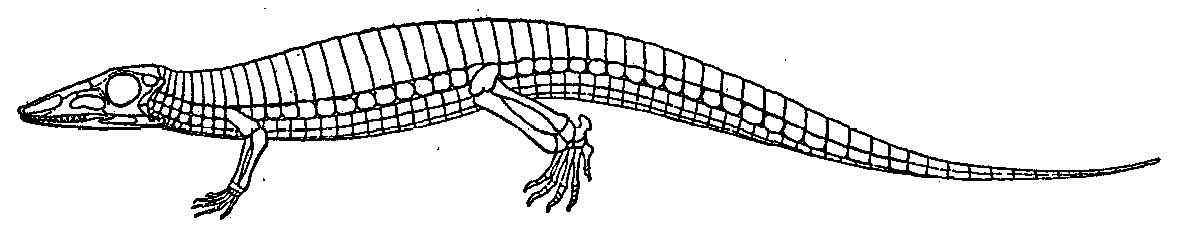
- Illustration of the reconstructed skeleton of the Late Triassic Aetosaurus. Othniel Charles Marsh (1895).
  †Aetosaurus
- †Aldebarania – type locality for genus
  - †Aldebarania arenitea – type locality for species
- †Alinka – type locality for genus
  - †Alinka cara – type locality for species
- †Alisporites
  - †Alisporites ovatus
- †Ambigostrea
  - †Ambigostrea sloani
  - †Ambigostrea tecticosta
- †Ampullina – tentative report
- Amuletum – tentative report
- †Anchura
- †Androvettia
  - †Androvettia carolinensis
  - †Androvettia statenensis
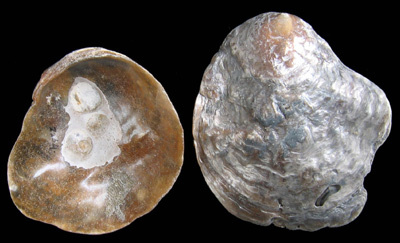
- Interior and exterior of a shell of an Anomia, or jingle shell
  †Anomia
  - †Anomia argentaria
  - †Anomia fearensis
  - †Anomia fulleri
  - †Anomia linifera
  - †Anomia lintea
  - †Anomia lintea donohuensis
  - †Anomia olmstedi
  - †Anomia ornata
  - †Anomia penderana
  - †Anomia tellinoides
- †Anomoeodus
  - †Anomoeodus phaseolus
- Anteglosia – tentative report
- †Apatopus
  - †Apatopus lineatus
- †Aphrodina
  - †Aphrodina tippana
- †Arca
  - †Arca bladensis
- Architectonica
- †Architipula
  - †Architipula youngi – type locality for species
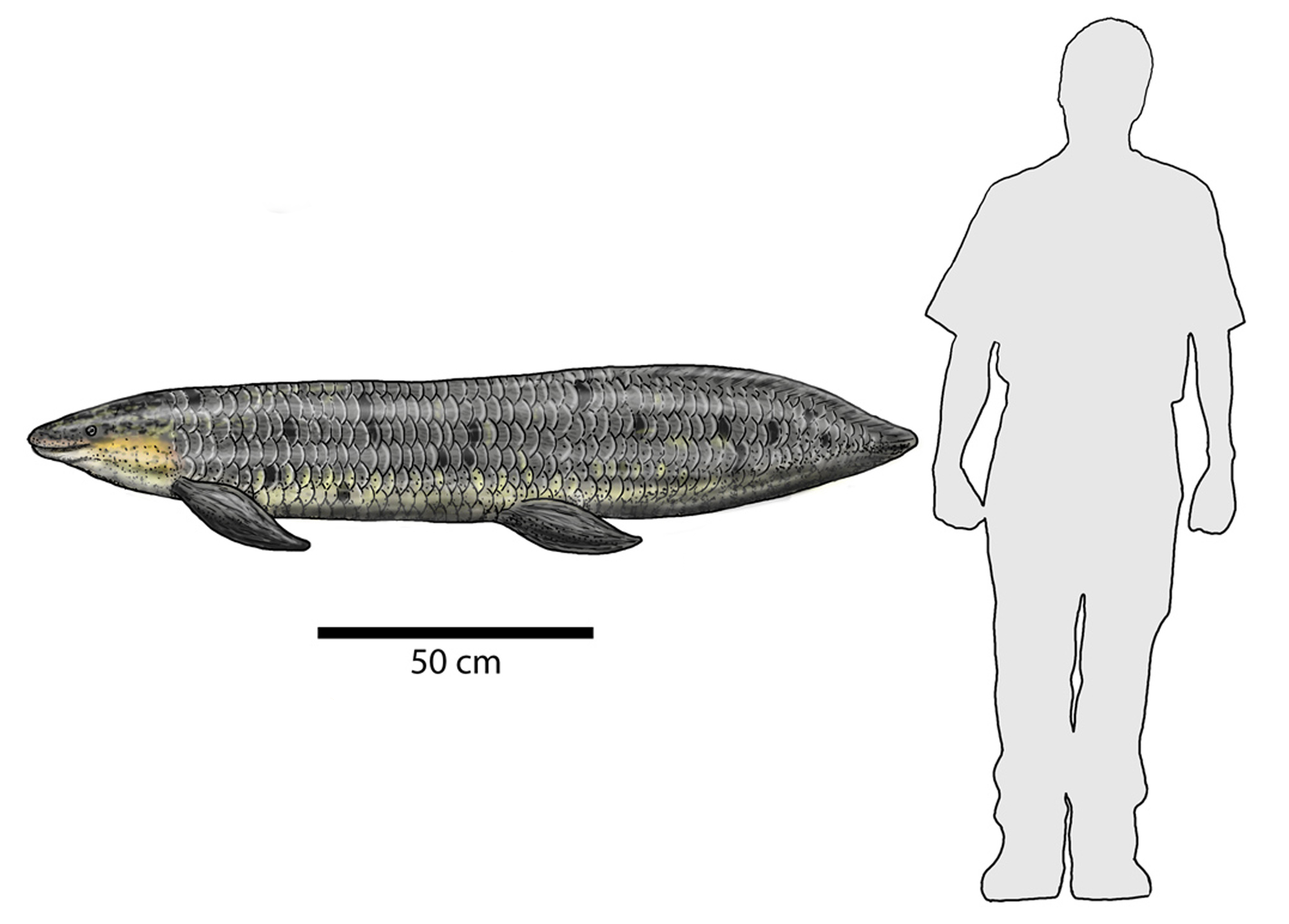
- Restoration of the Late Triassic lungfish Arganodus with an anachronistic human to scale
  †Arganodus
- †Argyrarachne – type locality for genus
  - †Argyrarachne solitus – type locality for species
- Astarte – tentative report
- †Asteracanthus
- Ataphrus
  - †Ataphrus kerri
- †Atreipus
  - †Atreipus milfordensis

== B ==
- †Baena – tentative report
- †Baikuris – report made of unidentified related form or using admittedly obsolete nomenclature
- Barbatia
  - †Barbatia carolinensis
- †Belemnitella
  - †Belemnitella americana
- †Beretra
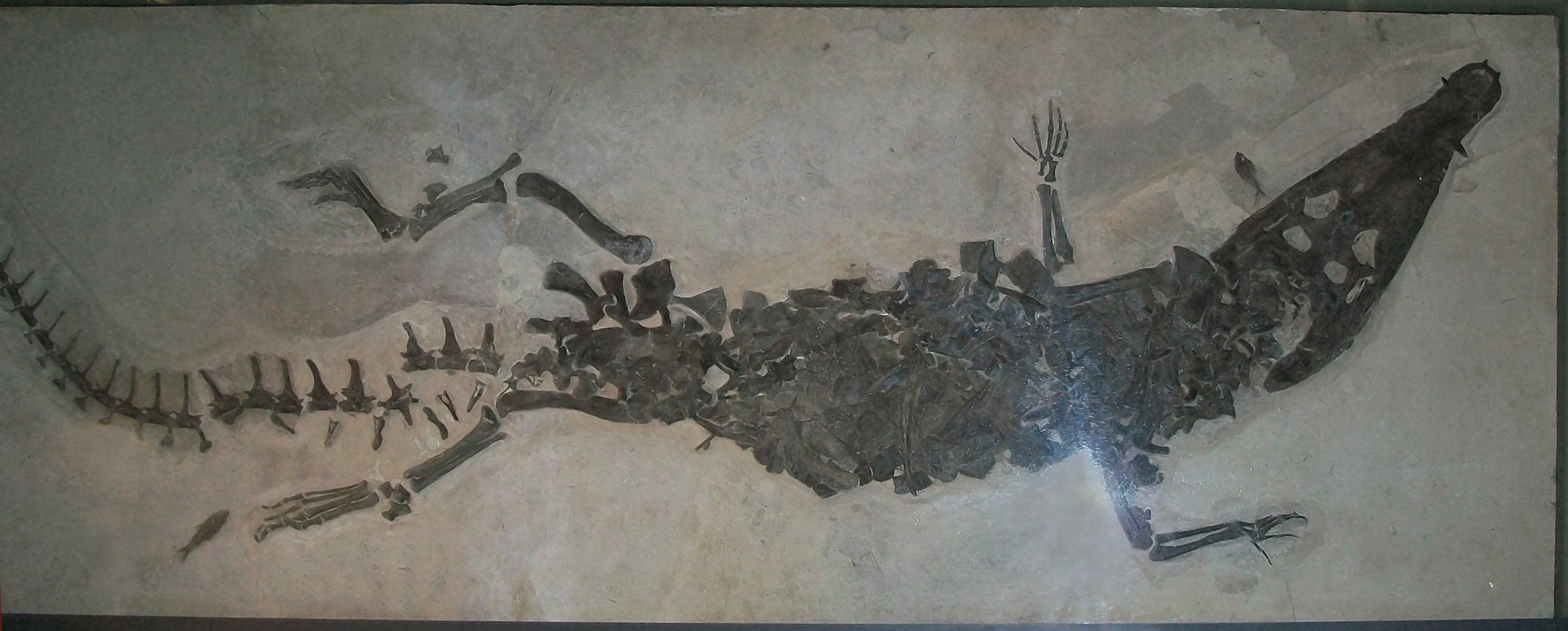
- Fossilized skeleton of the Late Cretaceous-Eocene crocodilian Borealosuchus
  †Borealosuchus
  - †Borealosuchus formidabilis
- †Boreogomphodon
  - †Boreogomphodon jeffersoni
- †Bothremys
  - †Bothremys cooki
- Botula
  - †Botula carolinensis
- †Brachiophyllum
- †Brachychirotherium – or unidentified comparable form
- †Brachymeris
  - †Brachymeris alta
- †Brachyphyllum
  - †Brachyphyllum squammosum
  - †Brachyphyllum squamosum
- †Brachyrhizodus
  - †Brachyrhizodus wichitaensis
  - †Brachyrhizodus witchitaensis
- †Brachyrhyphus – type locality for genus
  - †Brachyrhyphus distortus – type locality for species
- †Buccinopsis
  - †Buccinopsis globosa

== C ==
- Caestocorbula
  - †Caestocorbula crassiplica
  - †Caestocorbula williardi
- Callucina
  - †Callucina ripleyana
- †Camptonectes
  - †Camptonectes berryi – tentative report
  - †Camptonectes bubonis
  - †Camptonectes hilgardi
- Candona
  - †Candona rogersii
- †Cantioscyllium
  - †Cantioscyllium clementsi – type locality for species
- Carcharias – tentative report
- Cardium
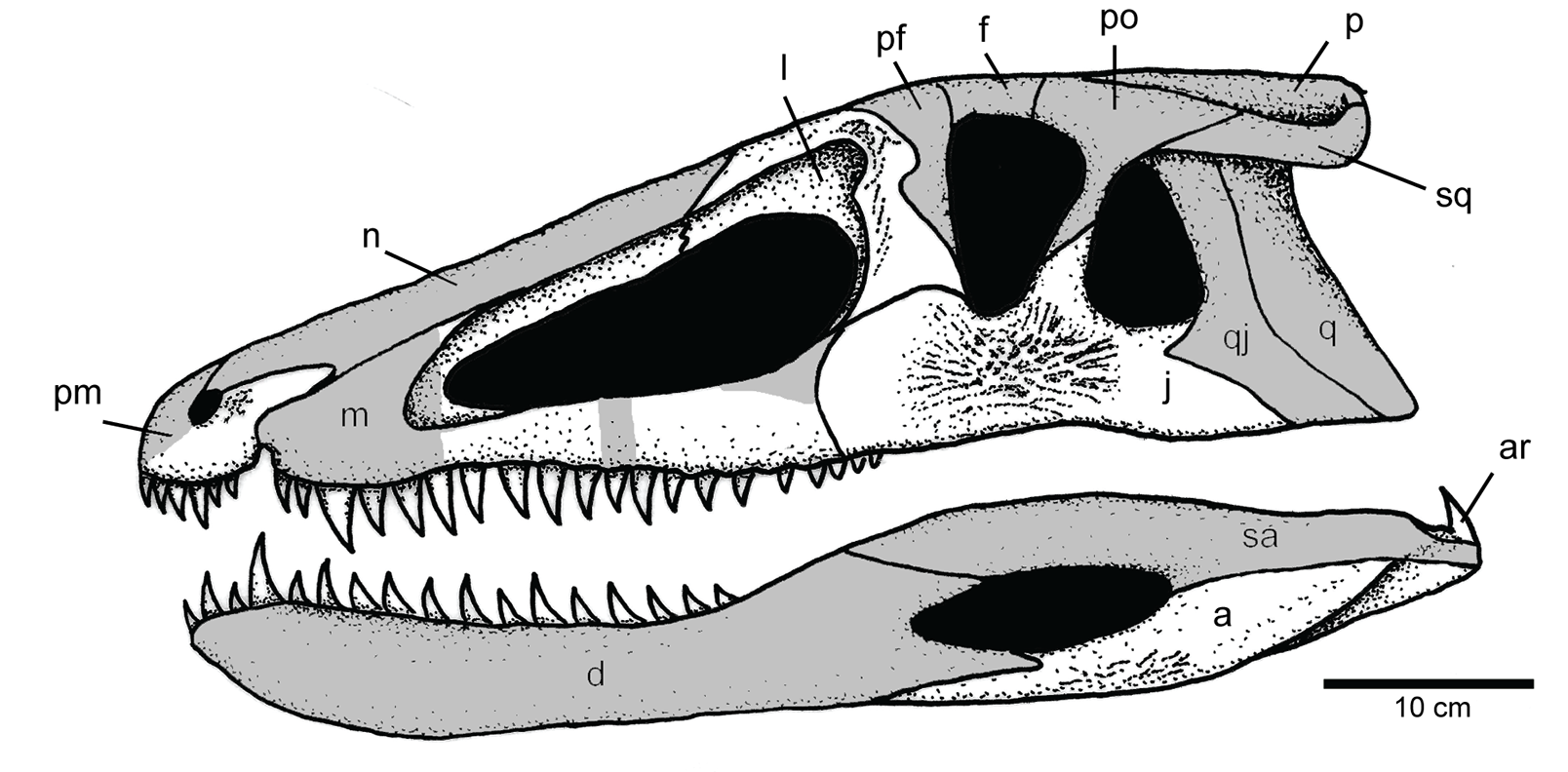
- Known material diagram illustrating a reconstructed skull and body of the Late Triassic distant crocodilian relative Carnufex
  †Carnufex – type locality for genus
  - †Carnufex carolinensis – type locality for species
- Caryocorbula
  - †Caryocorbula oxynema
- Cerithiella
  - †Cerithiella imlayi
  - †Cerithiella nodoliratum
  - †Cerithiella semirugatum
- †Cerithioderma
- †Chedighaii
  - †Chedighaii barberi
- †Chedignaii
  - †Chedignaii hutchisoni
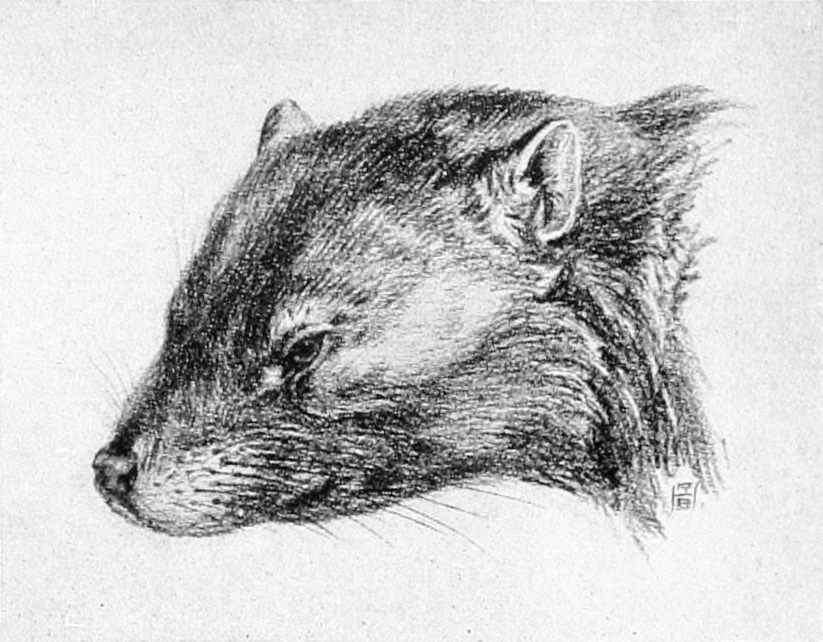
- Life restoration of the face of the Late Cretaceous multituberculate mammal Cimolomys
  †Cimolomys
- †Cionichthys
- Cladophlebis
  - †Cladophlebis microphylla
- Cliona
- †Coahomasuchus
- †Colognathus
  - †Colognathus obscurus
- †Compostrobus – or unidentified comparable form
  - †Compostrobus neotericus
- †Compsosaurus – type locality for genus
  - †Compsosaurus priscus – type locality for species
- †Compsostrobus
  - †Compsostrobus neotericus – type locality for species
- Corbula
  - †Corbula carolinensis – tentative report
  - †Corbula subgibbosa – tentative report
- †Costellacesta
  - †Costellacesta insolita
- Crassatella
  - †Crassatella hodgei
  - †Crassatella neusensis
  - †Crassatella vadosa
- †Crenella
  - †Crenella mitchelli
  - †Crenella serica
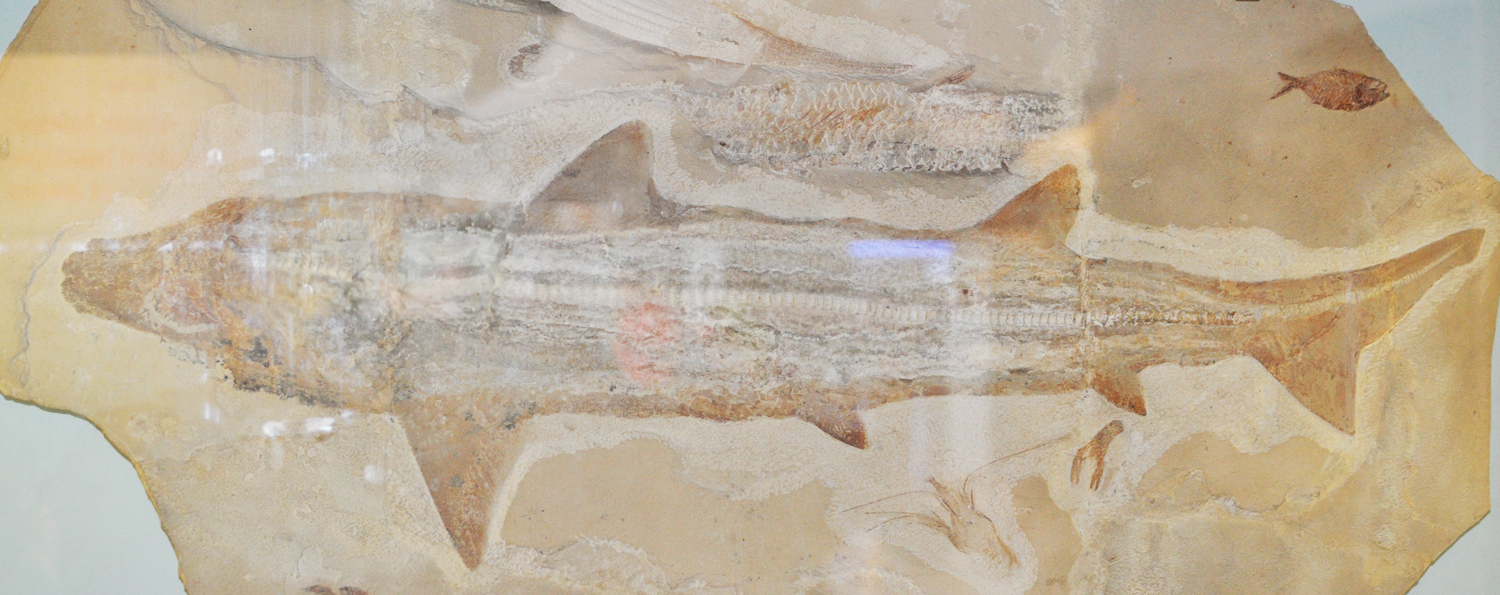
- Fossil of the Early Cretaceous-Eocene shark Cretolamna
  †Cretolamna
  - †Cretolamna appendiculata lata
  - †Cretolamna biauriculata
  - †Cretolamna serrata
- †Crosaphis
  - †Crosaphis virginiensis
- †Crosbysaurus
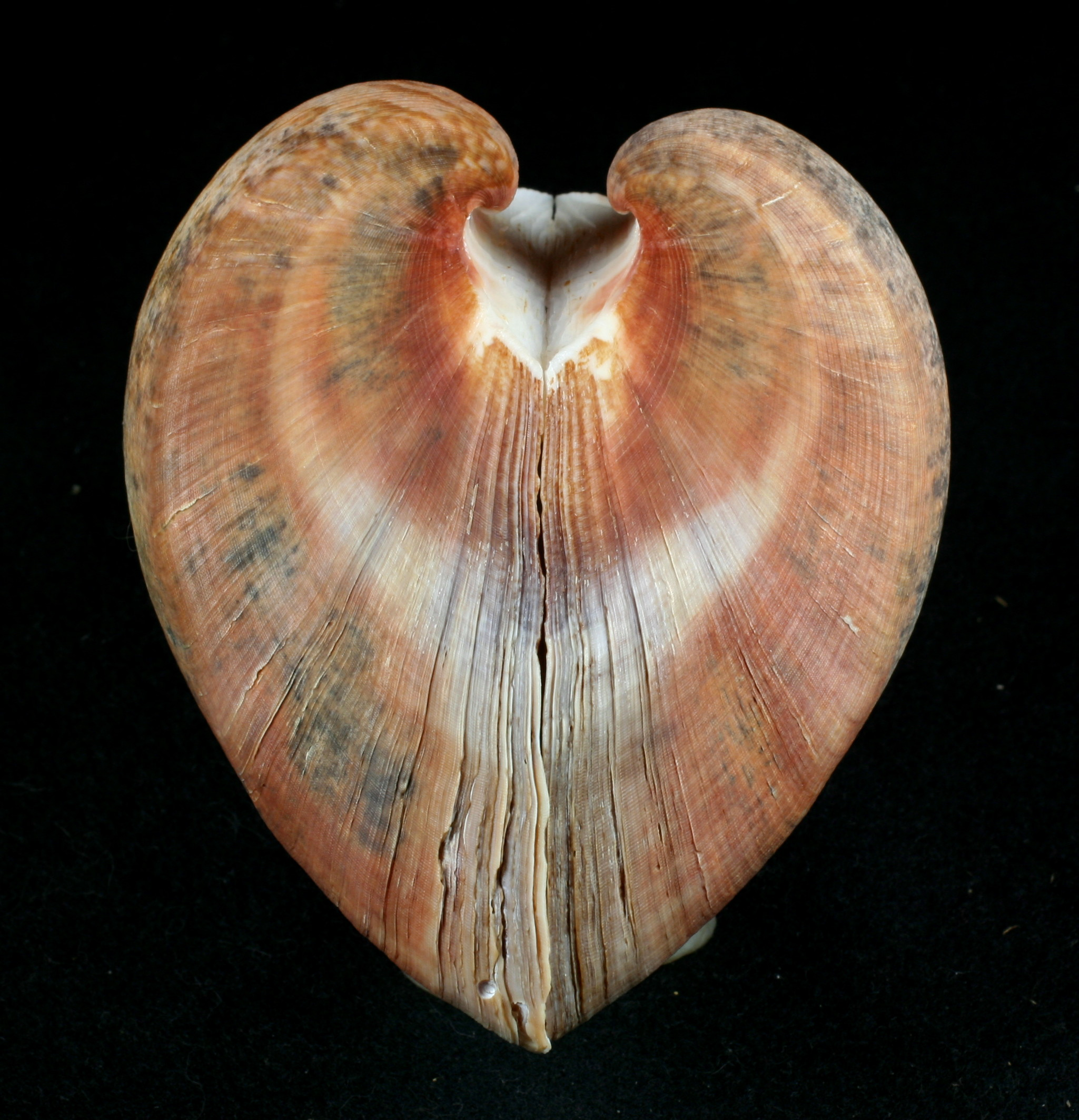
- Shell of a Cucullaea, or false ark shell
  Cucullaea
  - †Cucullaea capax
- †Cyathofoma
- Cylichna
- †Cylindracanthus
  - †Cylindracanthus rectus
- †Cymbophora
  - †Cymbophora cancellosa
  - †Cymbophora conradi
  - †Cymbophora trigonalis
- †Cymella
- †Cyprimeria
  - †Cyprimeria coonensis
  - †Cyprimeria depressa
  - †Cyprimeria gabbi
- Cyzicus

== D ==
- †Darwinula
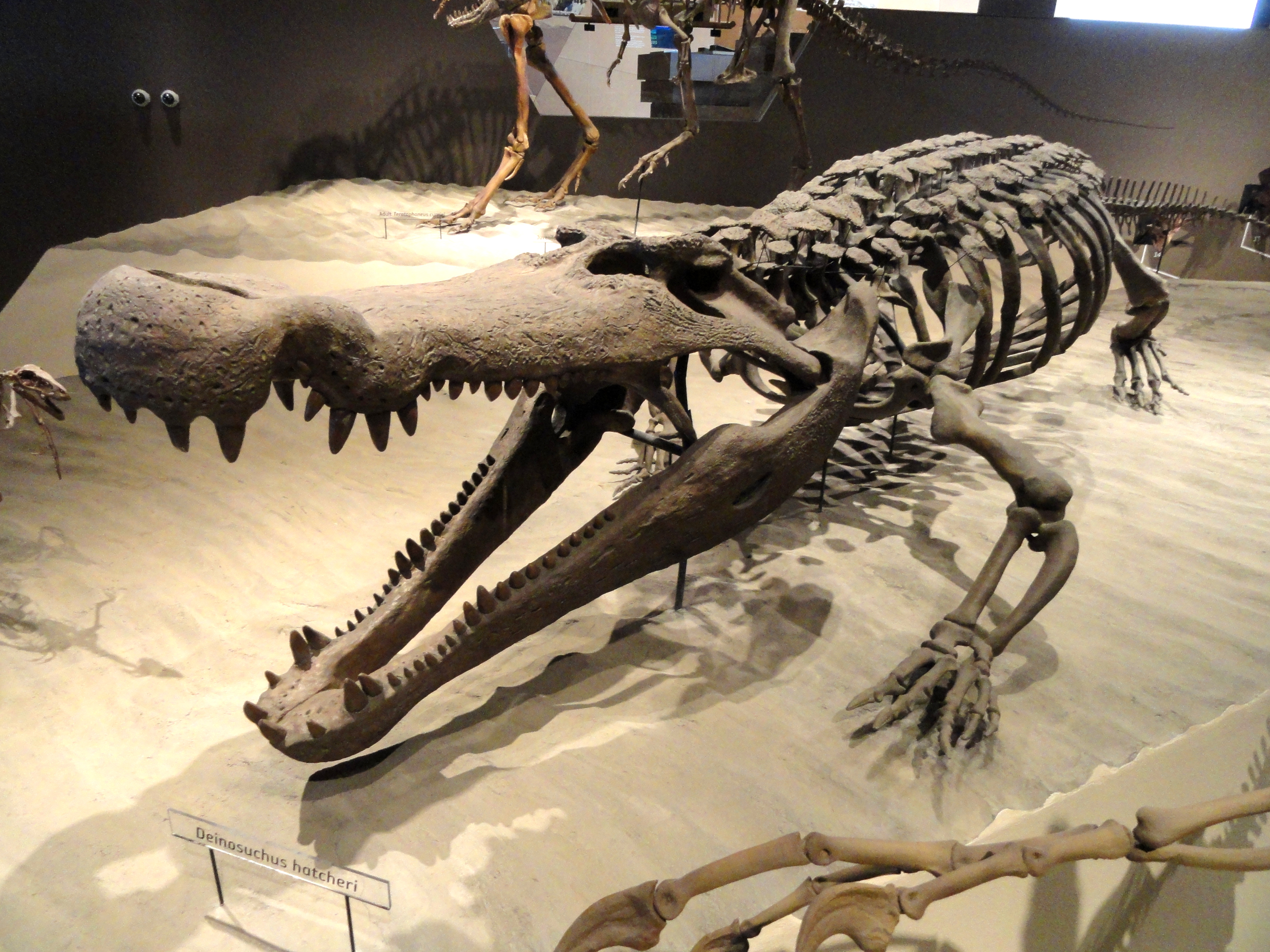
- Mounted fossilized skeleton of the Late Cretaceous Alligator relative Deinosuchus
  †Deinosuchus
  - †Deinosuchus rugosus
- Dictyocephalus – type locality for genus
  - †Dictyocephalus elegans – type locality for species
- †Dictyophyllum
- †Diplurus
  - †Diplurus newarki – or unidentified comparable form
- †Dreissena – tentative report
- †Dromatherium – type locality for genus
  - †Dromatherium sylvestre – type locality for species
- †Dromicosuchus – type locality for genus
  - †Dromicosuchus grallator – type locality for species

== E ==
- †Egertonia
- †Elatocladus – or unidentified comparable form
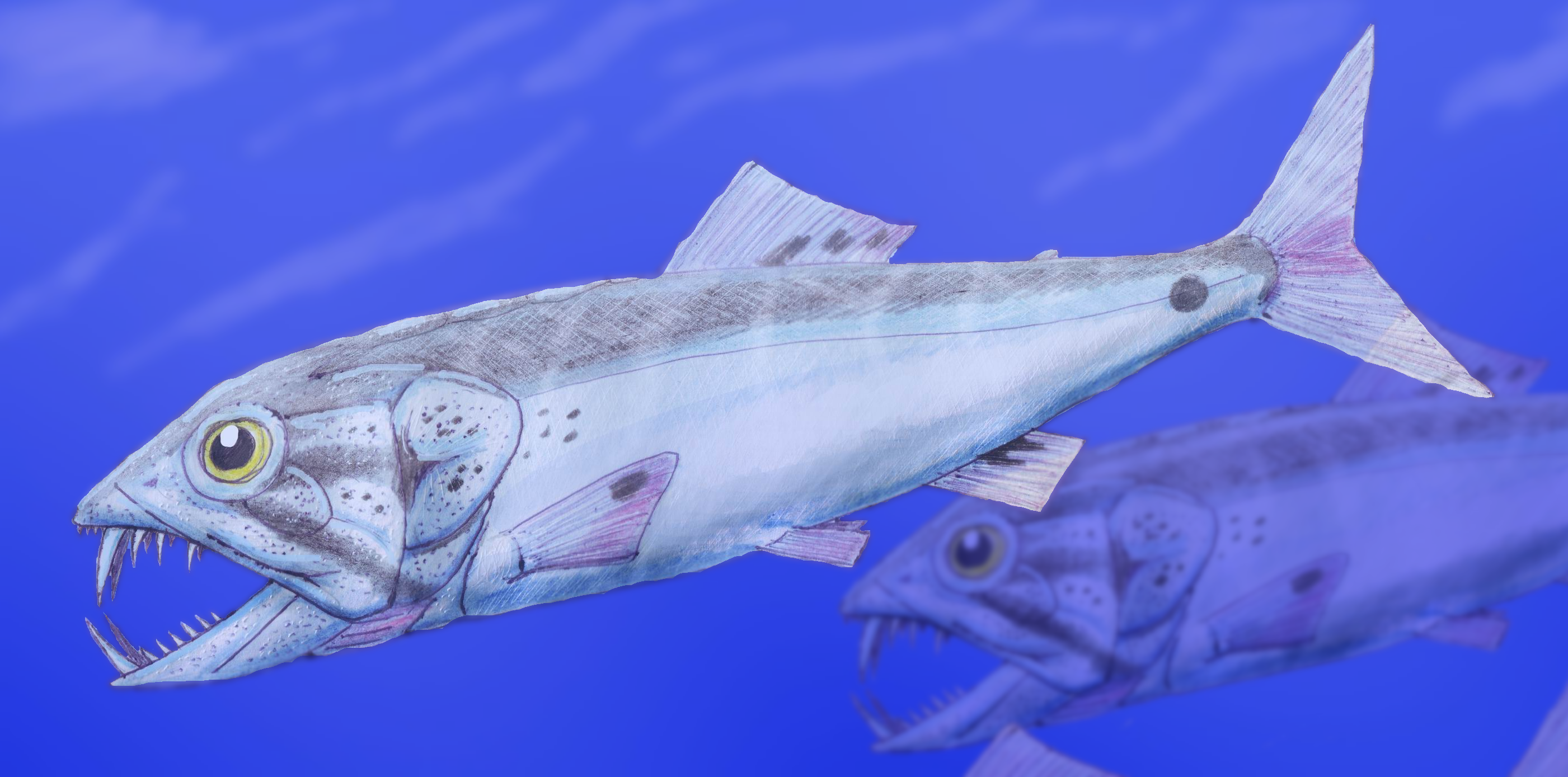
- Restoration of the Early Cretaceous-Eocene bony fish Enchodus, or the "saber-toothed herring"
  †Enchodus
  - †Enchodus petrosus – or unidentified comparable form
- †Equisetum
- †Estheria
  - †Estheria ovata
- †Etea
  - †Etea grandis
- †Euspira
  - †Euspira rectilabrum
- †Eutrephoceras
  - †Eutrephoceras dekayi
- †Exogyra
  - †Exogyra cancellata
  - †Exogyra costata
  - †Exogyra costata spinosa
  - †Exogyra ponderosa erraticostata

== F ==
- †Flemingostrea
  - †Flemingostrea blackensis
  - †Flemingostrea pratti
  - †Flemingostrea subspatula
  - †Flemingostrea subspatulata
- †Franxinopsis

== G ==
- Gegania
- †Geinitzia
  - †Geinitzia reichenbachii
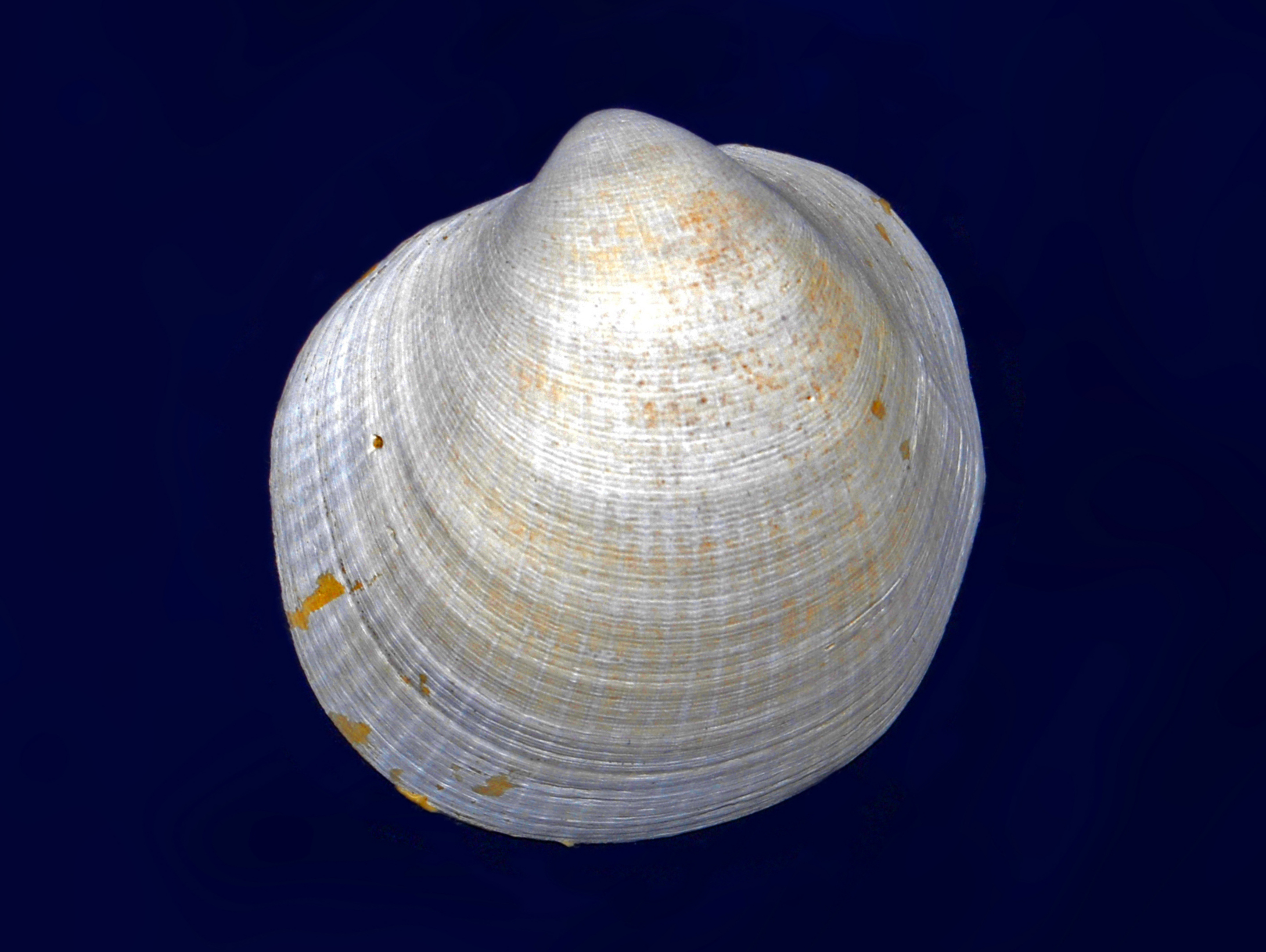
- Fossilized shell of a Glycymeris, or bittersweet clam
  Glycymeris
  - †Glycymeris subgyrata
- †Gorgetosuchus – type locality for genus
  - †Gorgetosuchus pekinensis – type locality for species
- †Gorgosaurus
- †Graciliala
  - †Graciliala johnsoni – tentative report
- †Granocardium
  - †Granocardium alabamense
- Gyrodes
- †Gyrotropis
  - †Gyrotropis kerri

== H ==
- †Hadrosaurus
  - †Hadrosaurus minor – tentative report
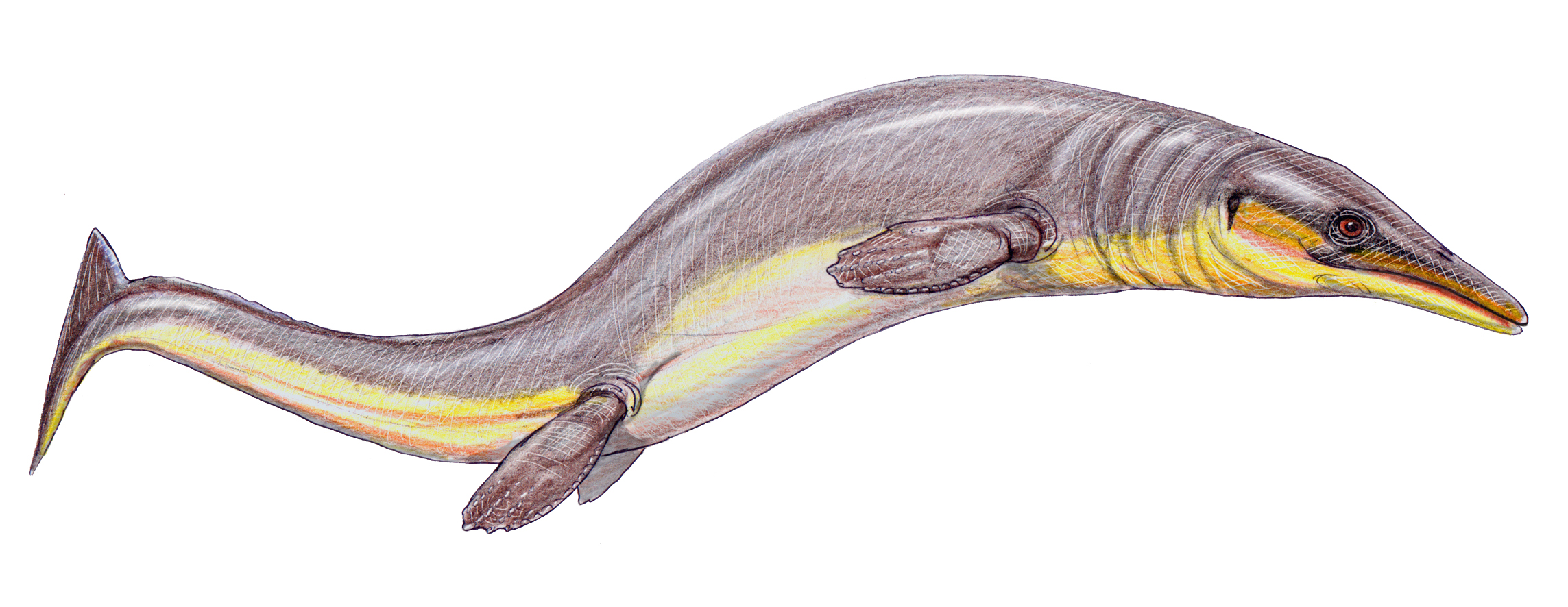
- Life restoration of the Late Cretaceous mosasaur Halisaurus
  †Halisaurus
- †Hamulus
  - †Hamulus onyx
  - †Hamulus walkerensis
- †Harduinia
  - †Harduinia kellumi
  - †Harduinia moretonis
  - †Harduinia mortonis
- †Himeriella – or unidentified comparable form
- †Hybodus
  - †Hybodus montanensis
- †Hypolophus
- †Hypophylloceras
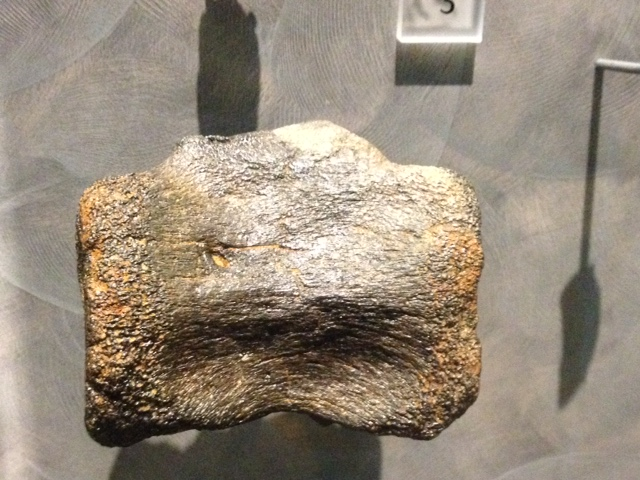
- Fossilized vertebra of the Late Cretaceous duck-billed dinosaur Hypsibema
  †Hypsibema – type locality for genus
  - †Hypsibema crassicauda – type locality for species

== I ==
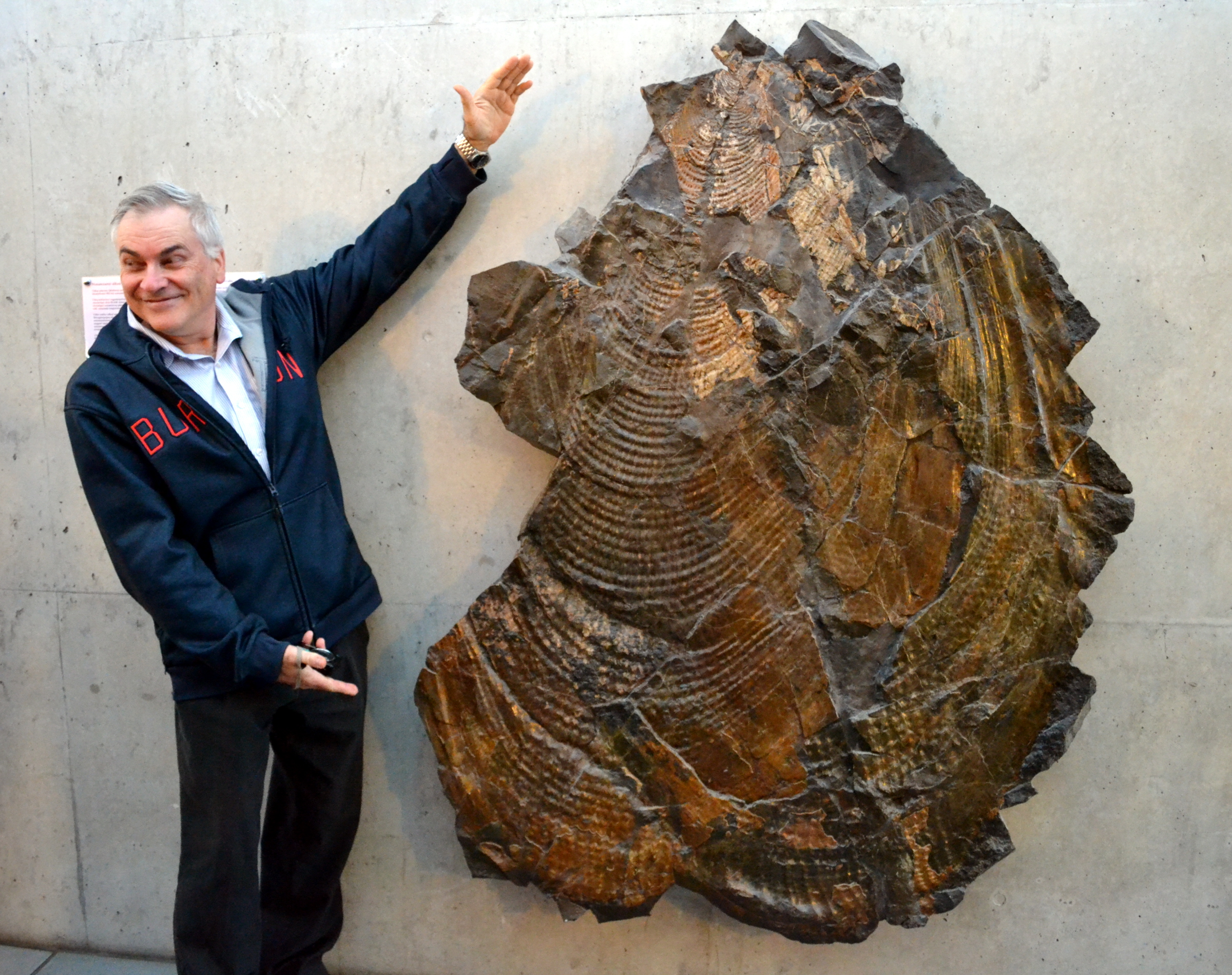
- Fossilized shell of the Early Jurassic-Late Cretaceous marine bivalve Inoceramus with a human indicating its size
  †Inoceramus
- †Ischyodus
  - †Ischyodus bifurcatus – or unidentified comparable form
- †Ischyrhiza
  - †Ischyrhiza mira
- Isognomon
  - †Isognomon holmesi
- Isurus

== L ==
- †Laccopteris
  - †Laccopteris smithii
- †Lamellaptychus
  - †Lamellaptychus beyrichodidayi
- †Laxispira
  - †Laxispira monilifera
- †Leehermania – type locality for genus
  - †Leehermania prorova – type locality for species
- †Legumen
  - †Legumen carolinensis – tentative report
  - †Legumen concentricum
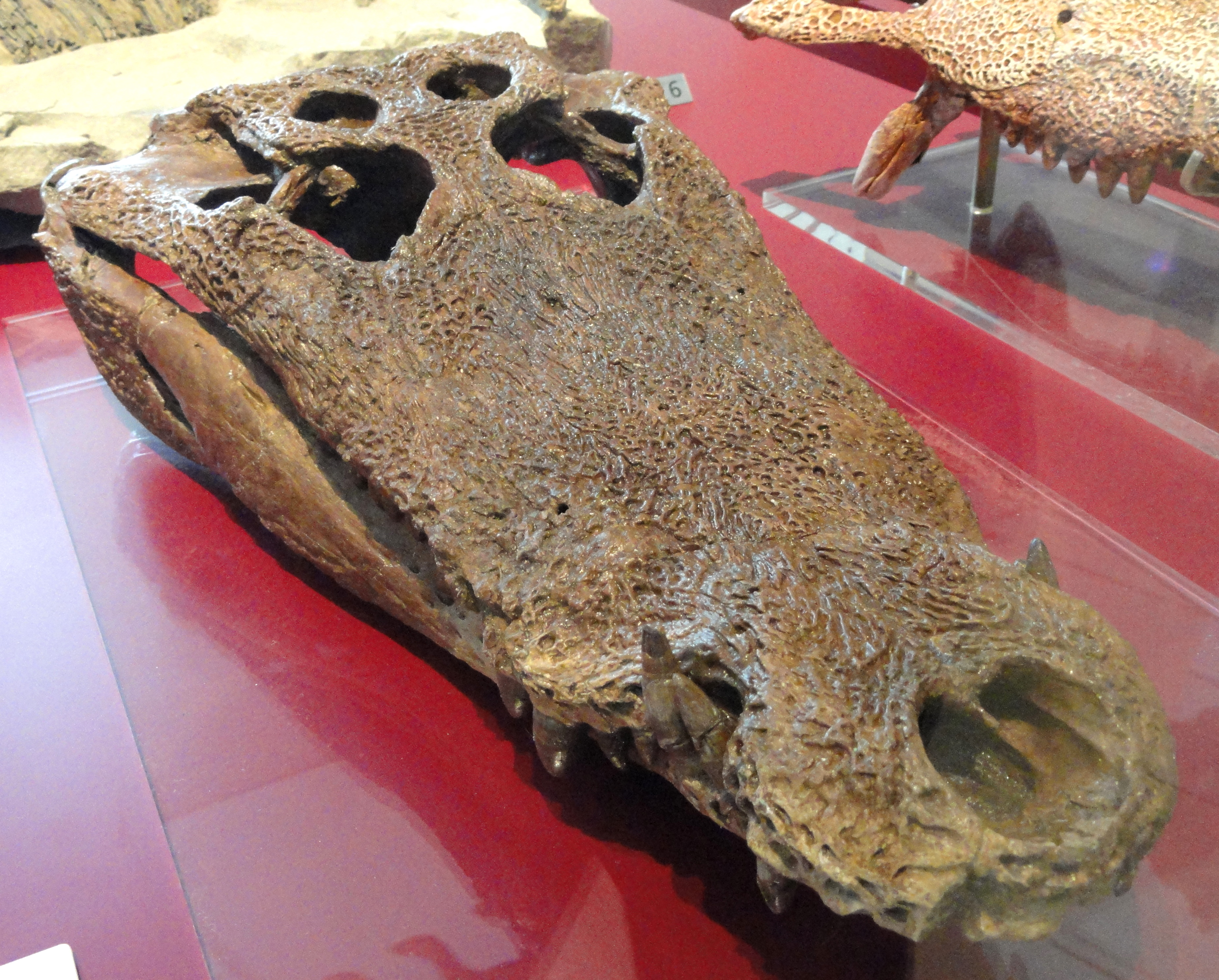
- Fossilized skull of the Late Cretaceous alligator relative Leidyosuchus
  †Leidyosuchus – tentative report
- †Lepacyclotes
- †Lepidodendron
- †Leptocycas – type locality for genus
  - †Leptocycas gracilis – type locality for species
- †Leptosolen
  - †Leptosolen biplicata
- Lima
  - †Lima oxypleura
  - †Lima pelagica
- Limatula
  - †Limatula acutilineata
- Limopsis
  - †Limopsis meeki
- †Linearis
  - †Linearis magnoliensis
  - †Linearis metastriata
- †Lingula
- †Linthia
  - †Linthia variabilis
- †Liopeplum
  - †Liopeplum tarensis
- †Liothyris
  - †Liothyris carolinensis
- †Liriodendroidea
  - †Liriodendroidea carolinensis – type locality for species
  - †Liriodendroidea latirapha – type locality for species
- †Lonchopteris
  - †Lonchopteris virginiensis
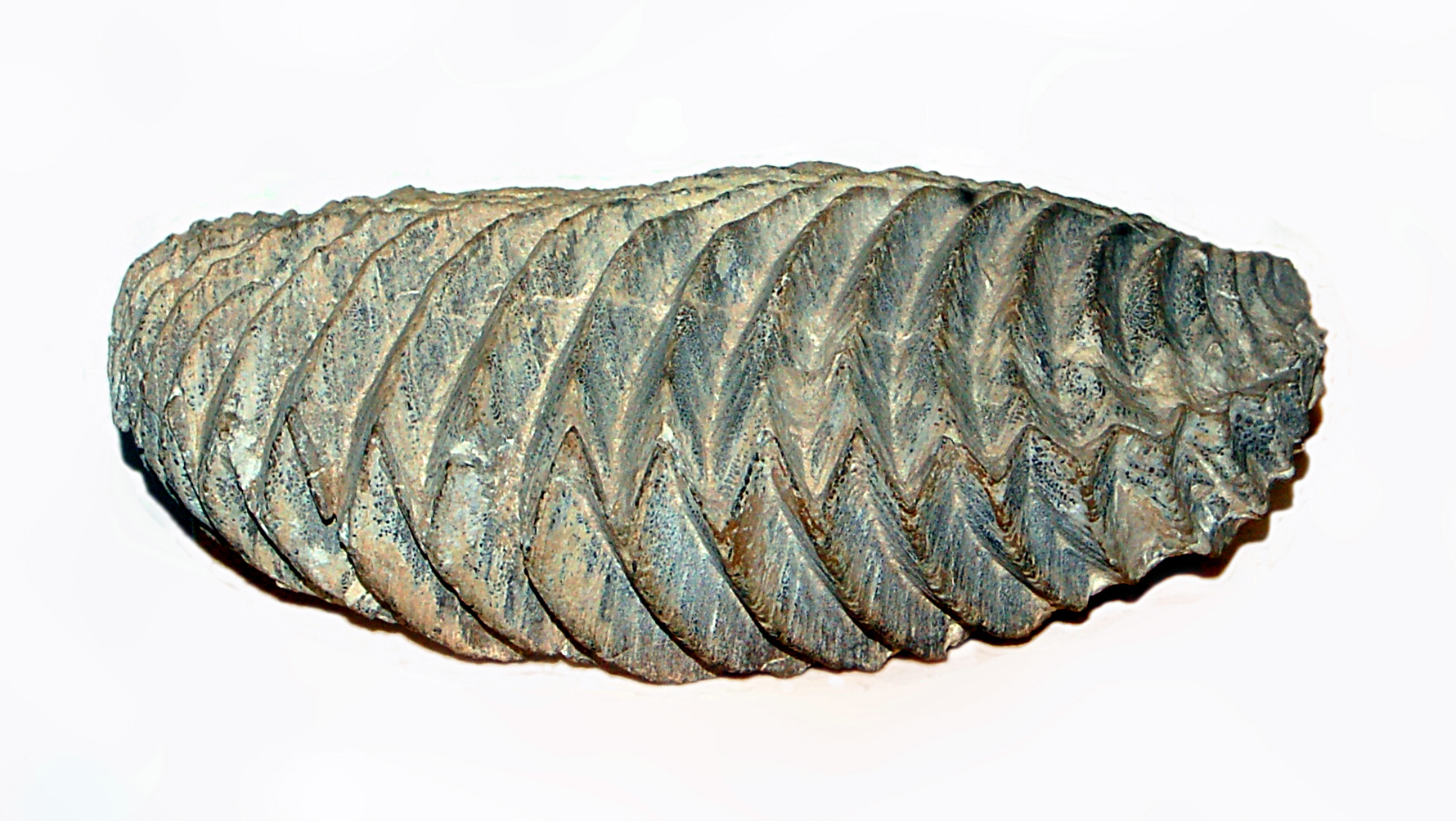
- Fossilized shell of the Triassic-modern marine bivalve Lopha
  Lopha
  - †Lopha falcata
- †Lowenstamia
  - †Lowenstamia liratus – tentative report
- †Lucasuchus
  - †Lucasuchus hunti
- †Lucina
  - †Lucina repleyana
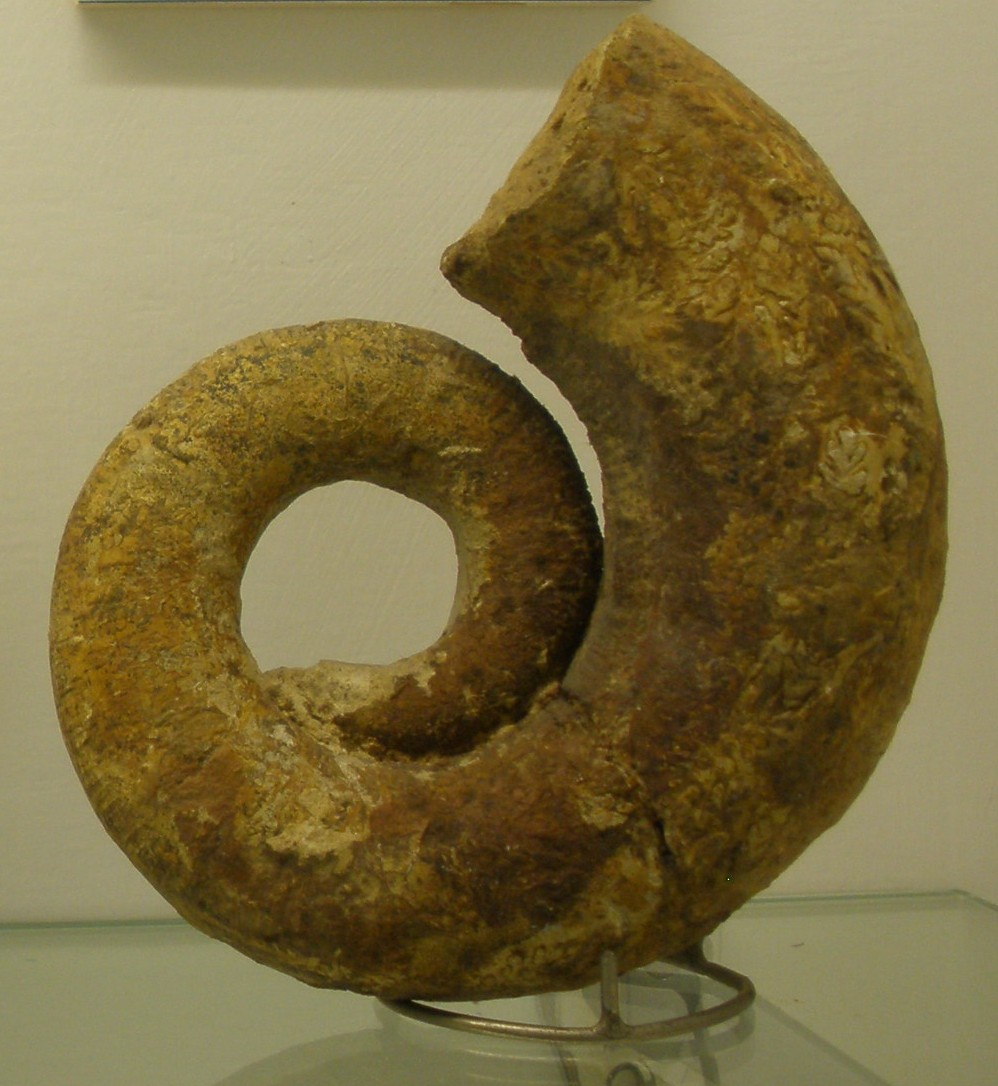
- Fossilized shell of the Early Jurassic-Late Cretaceous ammonoid cephalopod Lytoceras
  †Lytoceras

== M ==
- Martesia – tentative report
- †Mecistotrachelos
  - †Mecistotrachelos apeoros
- Melanatria – tentative report
- †Metarchilimonia
  - †Metarchilimonia krzeminskorum
  - †Metarchilimonia solita
- †Metreophyllum
- †Micrabacia
- †Microconodon – type locality for genus
  - †Microconodon tenuirostris – type locality for species
- †Morea
  - †Morea cancellaria
- †Moriconia
  - †Moriconia cyclotoxon
- †Mormolucoides
  - †Mormolucoides articulatus
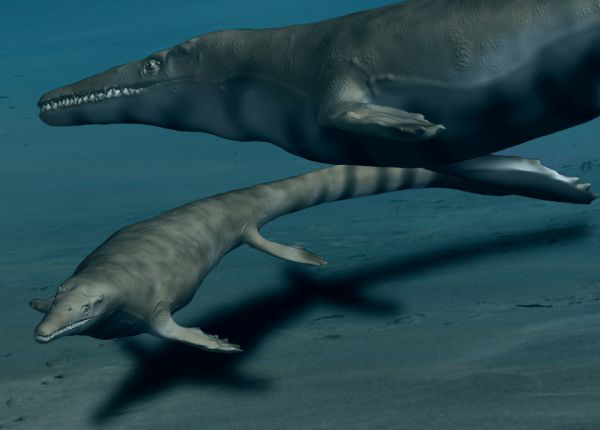
- Life restoration of two of the Late Cretaceous Mosasaurus
  †Mosasaurus
  - †Mosasaurus impar

== N ==
- †Napulus
- †Nemodon
  - †Nemodon brevifrons
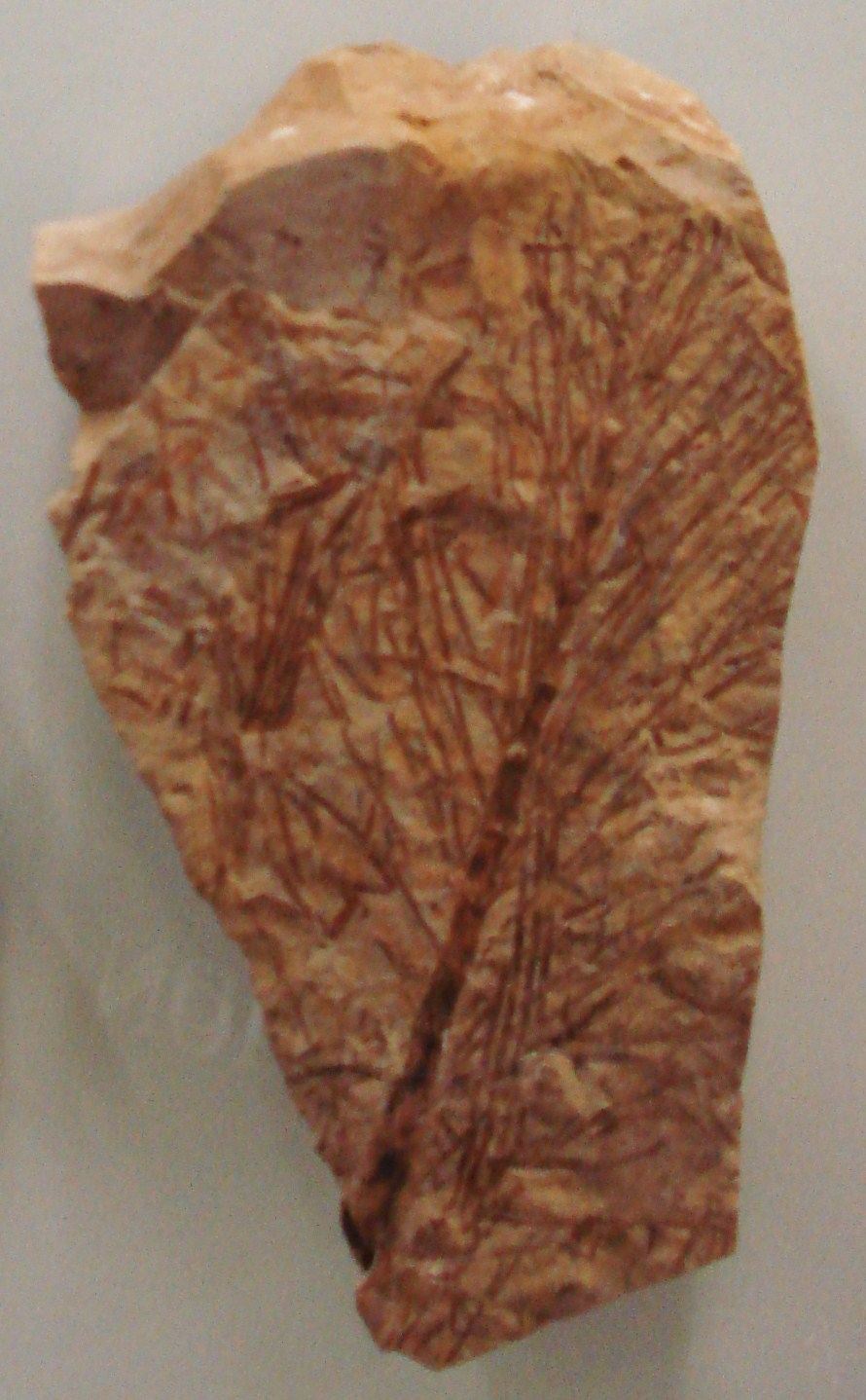
- Fossilized foliage of the Triassic-Middle Jurassic horsetail relative Neocalamites
  †Neocalamites
  - †Neocalamites knowltoni
  - †Neocalamites knowtonii – or unidentified comparable form
  - †Neocalamites virginiensis
- Nerita
- Nucula
  - †Nucula stantoni
- Nuculana
  - †Nuculana kerrensis
  - †Nuculana multiconcentrica
- †Nymphalucina
  - †Nymphalucina parva

== O ==
- Odontaspis
  - †Odontaspis samhammeri
- †Opertochasma
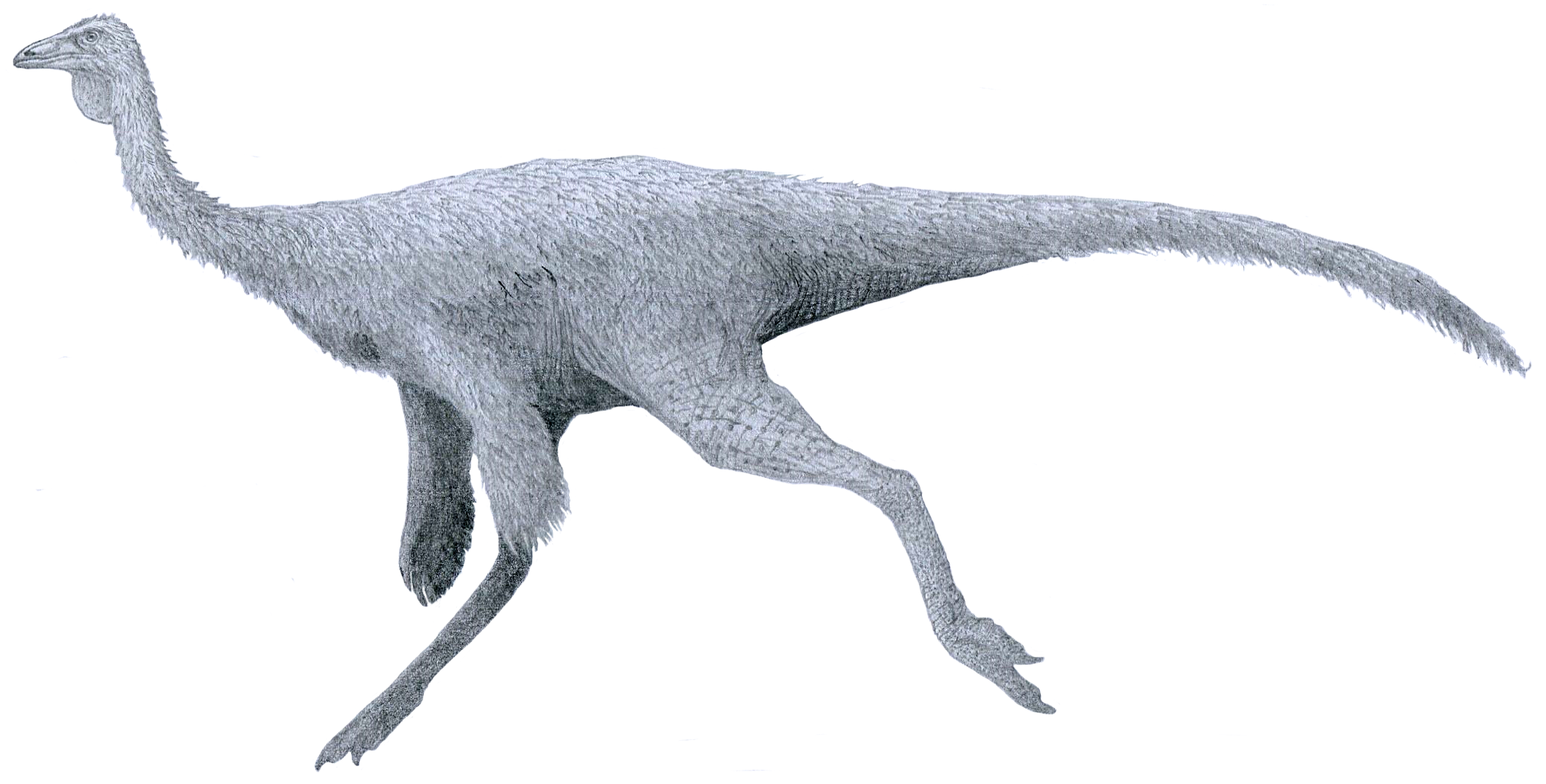
- Life restoration of the Late Cretaceous ostrich dinosaur Ornithomimus
  †Ornithomimus – tentative report
- †Ornopsis
- †Osteopleurus
- Ostrea
  - †Ostrea sloani
- †Otozamites
  - †Otozamites hespera
  - †Otozamites powelli

== P ==
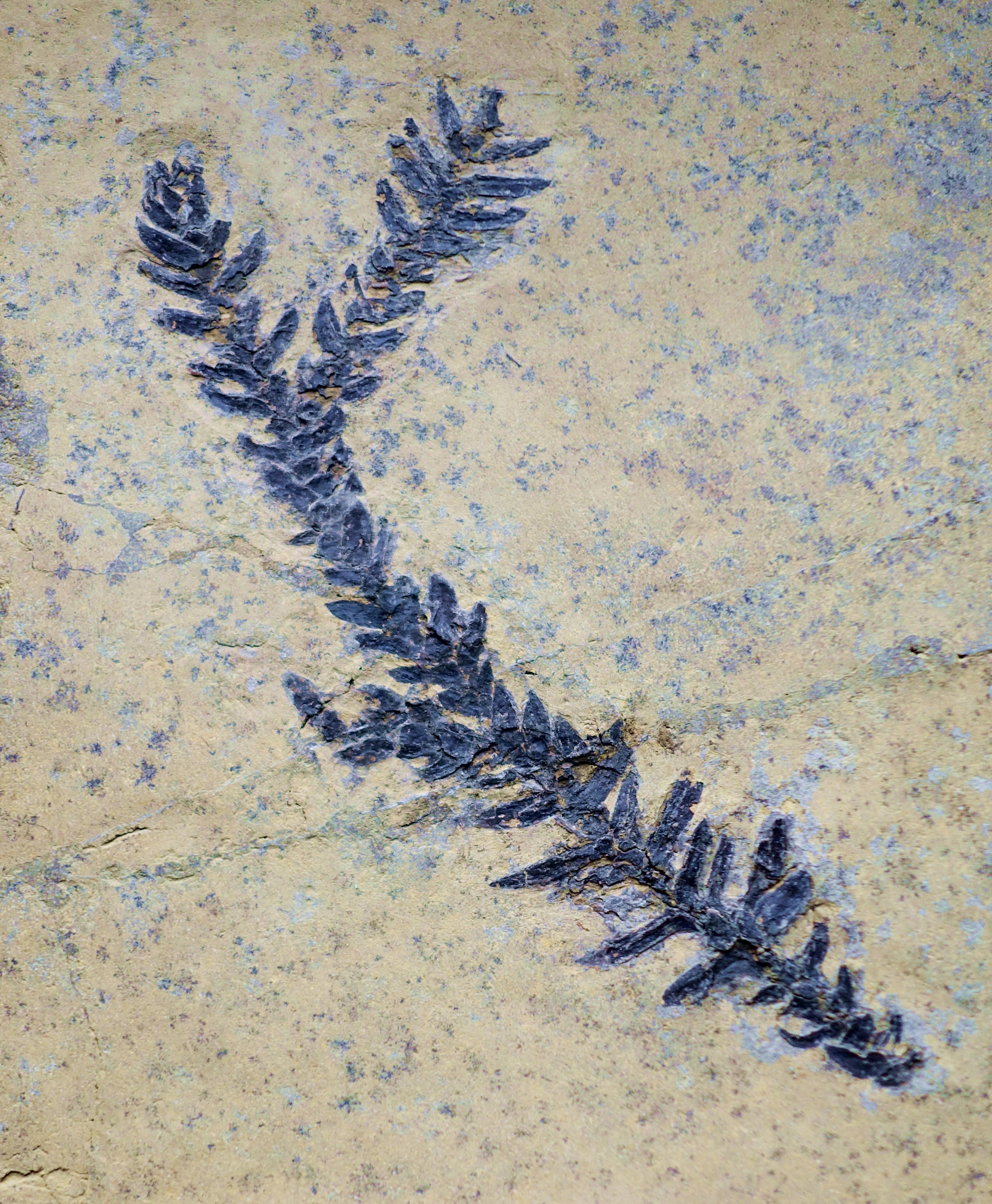
- Fossilized foliage of the Carboniferous-Late Cretaceous plant Pagiophyllum
  †Pagiophyllum
  - †Pagiophyllum diffusum
  - †Pagiophyllum simpsoniae
- †Paladmete – or unidentified comparable form
  - †Paladmete gardnerae
- †Palaeolimnadia – tentative report
- †Palinandromeda
  - †Palinandromeda novaecaesareae
- †Pannaulika
  - †Pannaulika triassic
- Panopea
  - †Panopea decisa
  - †Panopea monmouthensis
- †Paralbula
  - †Paralbula casei
- †Paranomia
  - †Paranomia scabra
- †Pariostegus – or unidentified comparable form
- †Parmicorbula
  - †Parmicorbula bisulcata – tentative report
  - †Parmicorbula suffalciata
- †Pekinopteris – type locality for genus
  - †Pekinopteris auriculata – type locality for species
- †Pekinosaurus – type locality for genus
  - †Pekinosaurus olseni – type locality for species
- †Pelourdea
- Phacoides
  - †Phacoides glebula
- †Phlebopteris
  - †Phlebopteris smithii
- Pholadidea – tentative report
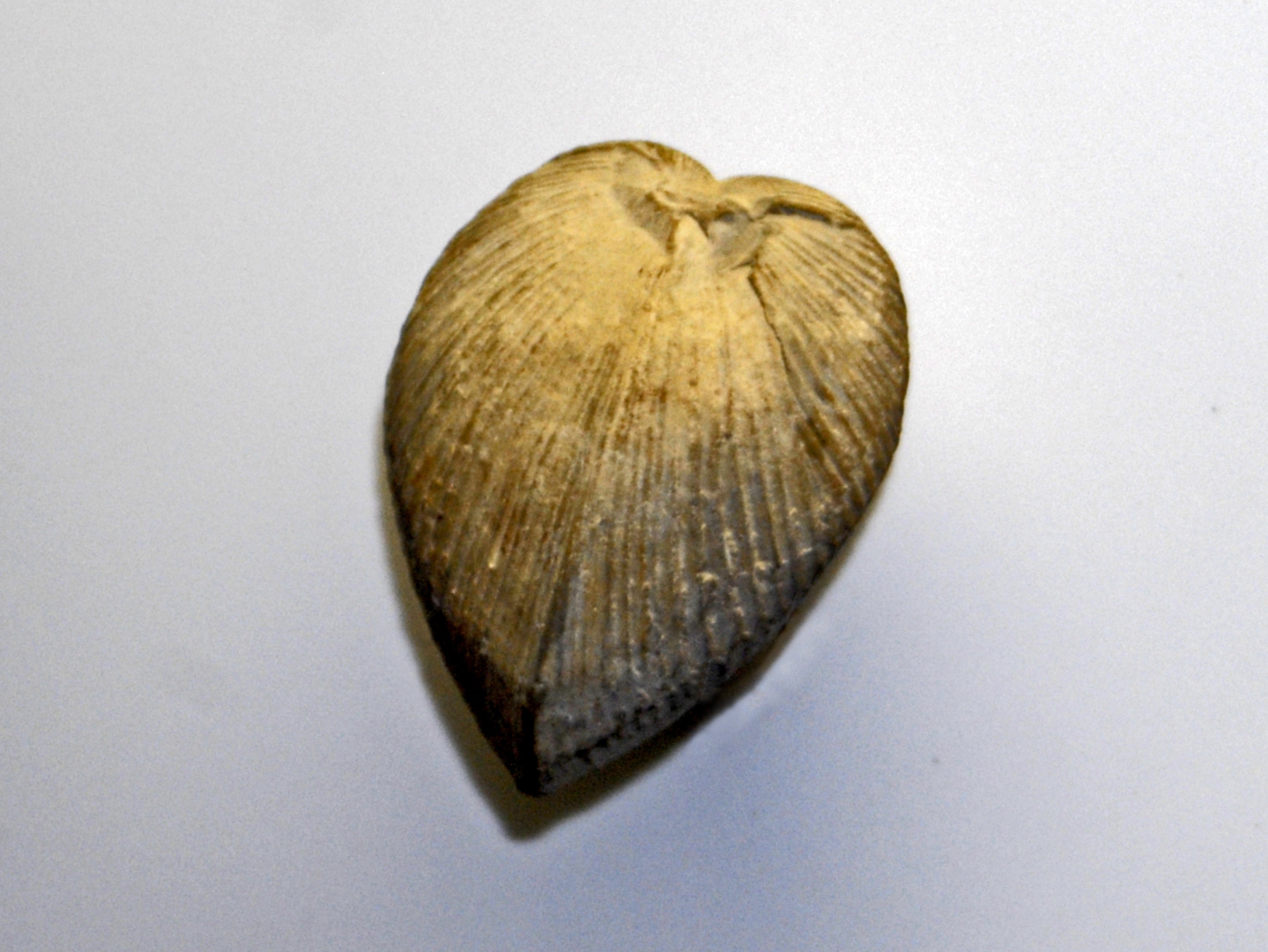
- Fossilized shell of the Early Triassic-Pliocene marine bivalve Pholadomya
  Pholadomya
  - †Pholadomya littlei
  - †Pholadomya sublevis
- Phyllodus
- †Phyloblatta
  - †Phyloblatta grimaldii – type locality for species
- †Pinna
- †Placenticeras – tentative report
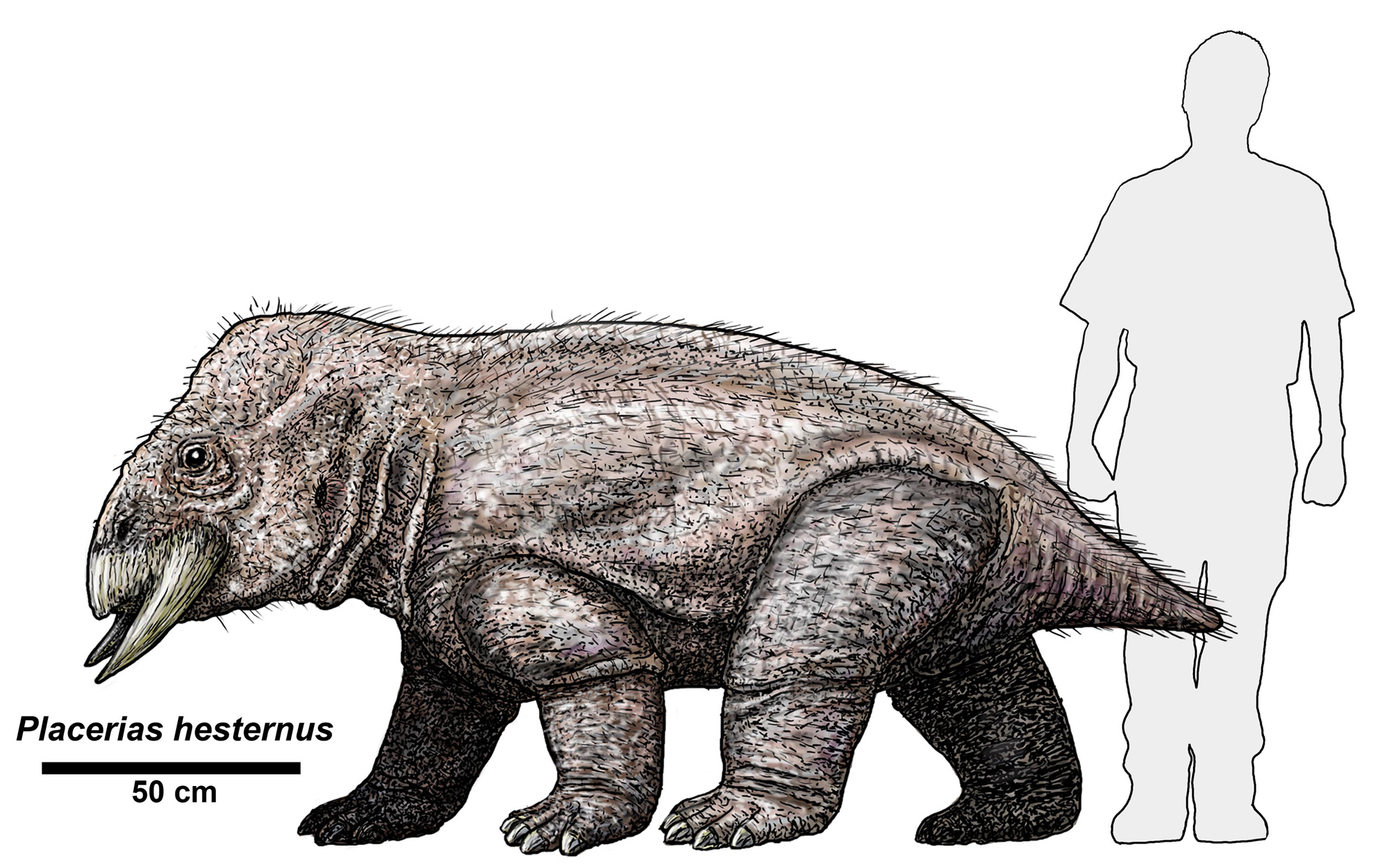
- Restoration of the Late Triassic synapsid (mammal precursor) Placerias with an anachronistic human to scale
  †Placerias
  - †Placerias hesternus
- †Platananthus
  - †Platananthus hueberi – type locality for species
- †Platanocarpus
  - †Platanocarpus carolinensis – type locality for species
- †Platecarpus
- †Pleuriocardia
  - †Pleuriocardia donohuense
  - †Pleuriocardia donohuensis
  - †Pleuriocardia penderense
- †Plicatolamna
  - †Plicatolamna arcuata – or unidentified comparable form
- †Plinthogomphodon – type locality for genus
  - †Plinthogomphodon herpetairus – type locality for species
- †Podozamites
- Polinices
- †Postligata
  - †Postligata greenensis
- †Postosuchus
  - †Postosuchus alisonae – type locality for species
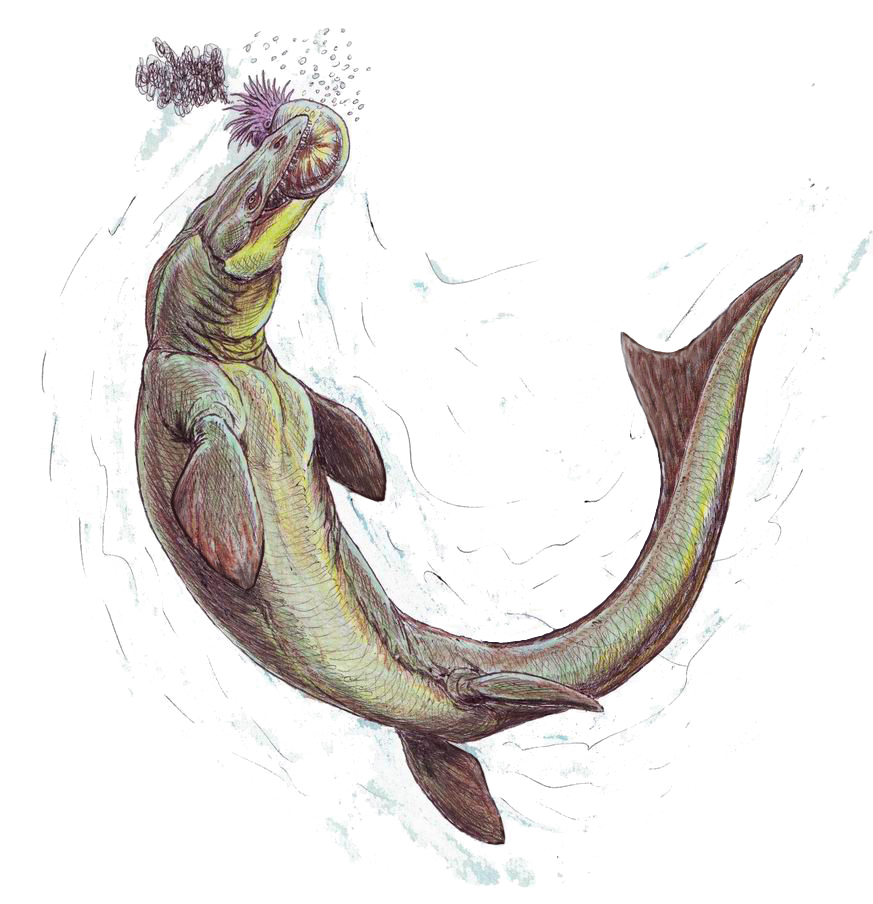
- Life restoration of the Late Cretaceous mosasaur Prognathodon preying upon an ammonoid cephalopod
  †Prognathodon
- †Prosechamyia
  - †Prosechamyia dimedia
  - †Prosechamyia trimedia
- †Protocardia
  - †Protocardia spillmani
- †Protodonax
- †Pseudoctenis
- †Pseudolimea
  - †Pseudolimea kerri
  - †Pseudolimea reticulata
- †Pseudopolycentropodes – type locality for genus
  - †Pseudopolycentropodes virginicus – type locality for species
- †Pteria – tentative report
- †Pterocerella
- †Pterophyllum
- †Pterotrigonia
  - †Pterotrigonia bartrami – tentative report
  - †Pterotrigonia cerulea
  - †Pterotrigonia eufalensis
  - †Pterotrigonia eufaulensis
- †Pugnellus
- Pycnodonte
  - †Pycnodonte belli
  - †Pycnodonte vesicularis
- †Pyrgulifera – tentative report
- †Pyropsis

== R ==
- †Radiopecten
  - †Radiopecten mississippiensis
  - †Radiopecten quinquinarius
- †Revueltosaurus
  - †Revueltosaurus olseni
- †Rhombodus
  - †Rhombodus binkhorsti – or unidentified comparable form
  - †Rhombodus laevis
- †Rostellites
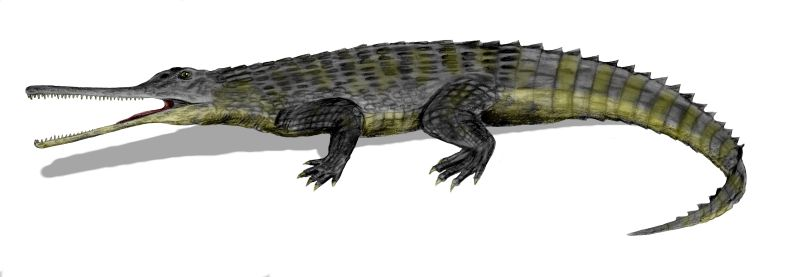
- Life restoration of the Late Triassic phytosaur Rutiodon
  †Rutiodon – type locality for genus
  - †Rutiodon carolinensis – type locality for species

== S ==
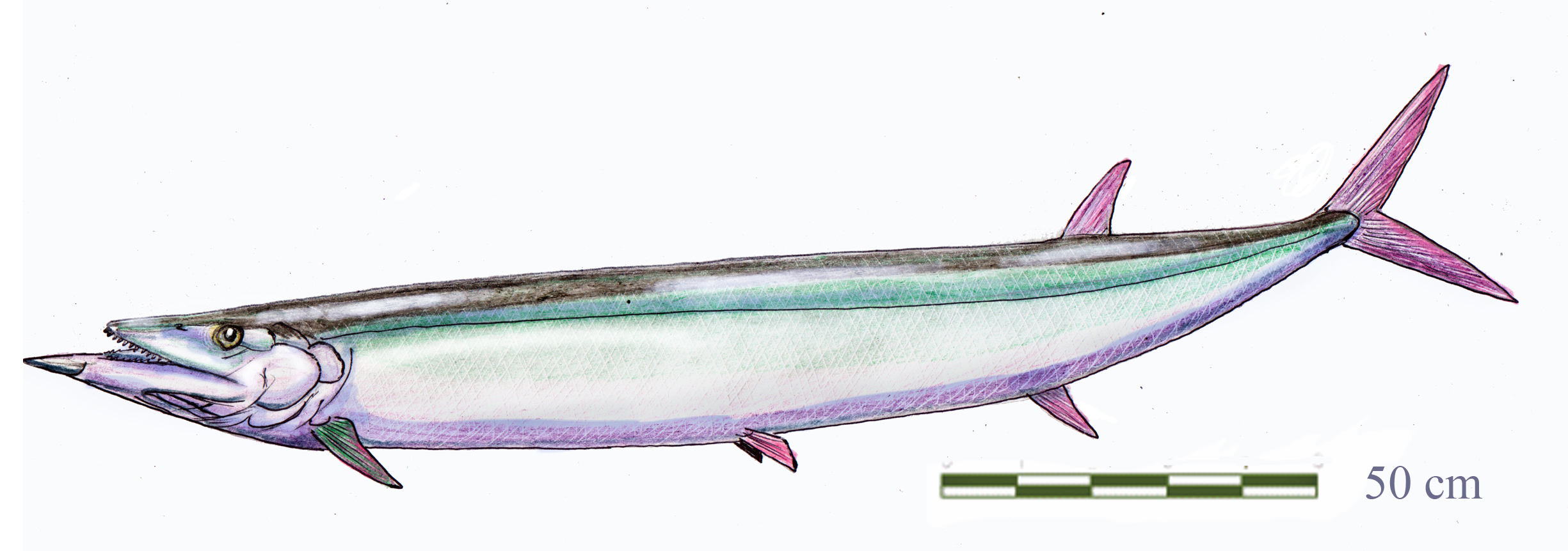
- Restoration of the Late Cretaceous bony fish Saurodon
  †Saurodon
- †Scapanorhynchus
  - †Scapanorhynchus texanus
- †Schizoneura
  - †Schizoneura virginiensis
- †Scoyenia – tentative report
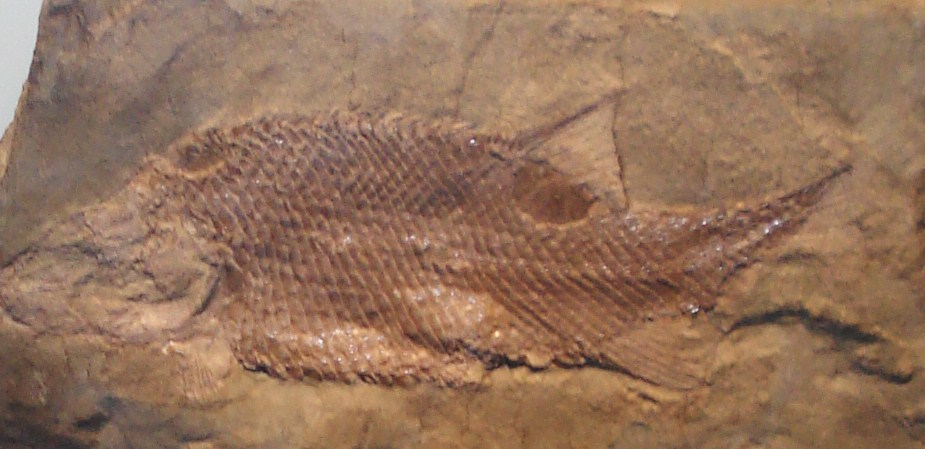
- Fossilized skeleton of the Late Triassic-Early Jurassic bony fish Semionotus
  †Semionotus
- Serpula
  - †Serpula cretacea
- †Solyma
  - †Solyma elliptica
  - †Solyma levis
- †Sphaenobaeria
- †Sphenodiscus
- †Sphenozamites
- †Spirematospermum
  - †Spirematospermum chandlerae
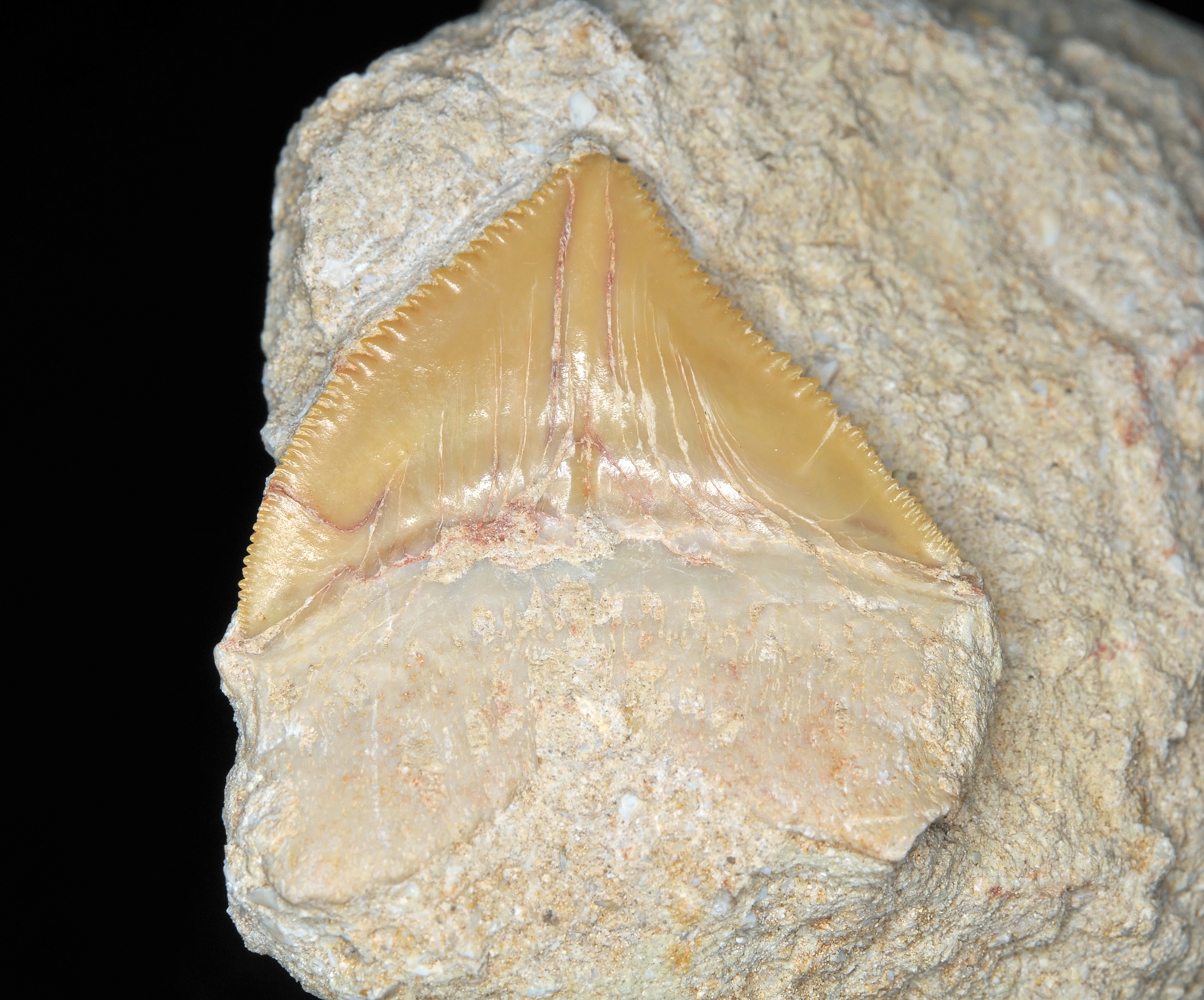
- Fossilized tooth of the Late Cretaceous shark Squalicorax
  Squalicorax
  - †Squalicorax kaupi
  - †Squalicorax pristodontus
- Squatina
  - †Squatina hassei
- †Stegomus
  - †Stegomus arcuatus
- †Stephanodus
- †Stephanophyllia
  - †Stephanophyllia cribraria – type locality for species
- Striarca
- †Striaticostatum
- †Syncyclonema
  - †Syncyclonema simplicius
- †Synodontaspis
  - †Synodontaspis holmdelensis
- †Synorichthys

== T ==
- †Tanytrachelos – type locality for genus
  - †Tanytrachelos ahynis – type locality for species
- †Taphrosphys
  - †Taphrosphys dares – type locality for species
- †Tellinimera
  - †Tellinimera gabbi
  - †Tellinimera stephensoni
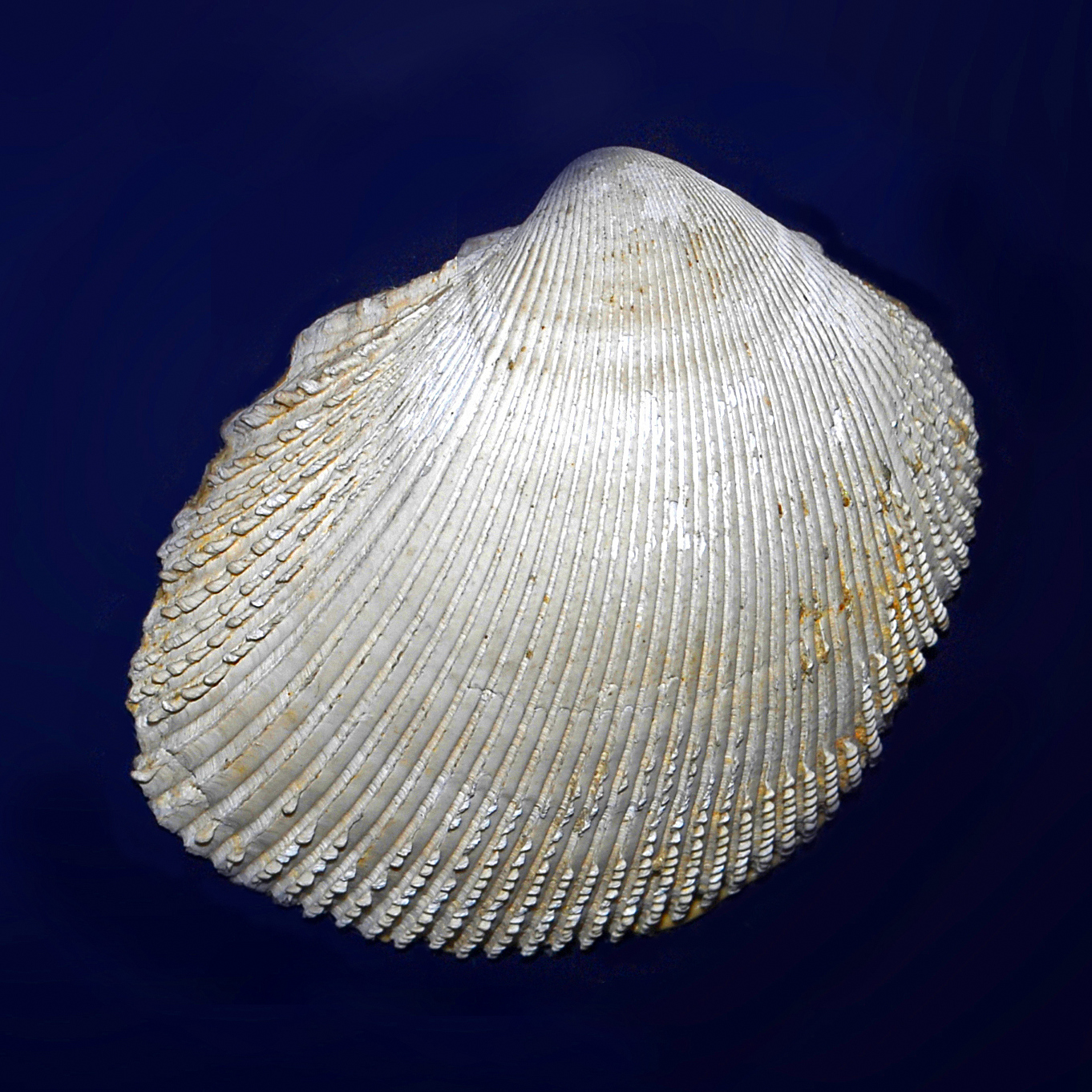
- Fossilized shell of a Trachycardium cockle
  Trachycardium
  - †Trachycardium carolinensis
  - †Trachycardium longstreeti
  - †Trachycardium vaughani
- †Trachytriton – tentative report
- †Triassopsychoda
  - †Triassopsychoda olseni
- †Triassothrips – type locality for genus
  - †Triassothrips virginicus – type locality for species
- Trichotropis
  - †Trichotropis squamosa
- †Trigonarca
  - †Trigonarca elongata
  - †Trigonarca maconensis
  - †Trigonarca triquetra
- †Trigonia – tentative report
- Trionyx
  - †Trionyx halophilus
- Turritella
  - †Turritella kerrensis
  - †Turritella quadrilira
  - †Turritella trilira
- †Turseodus
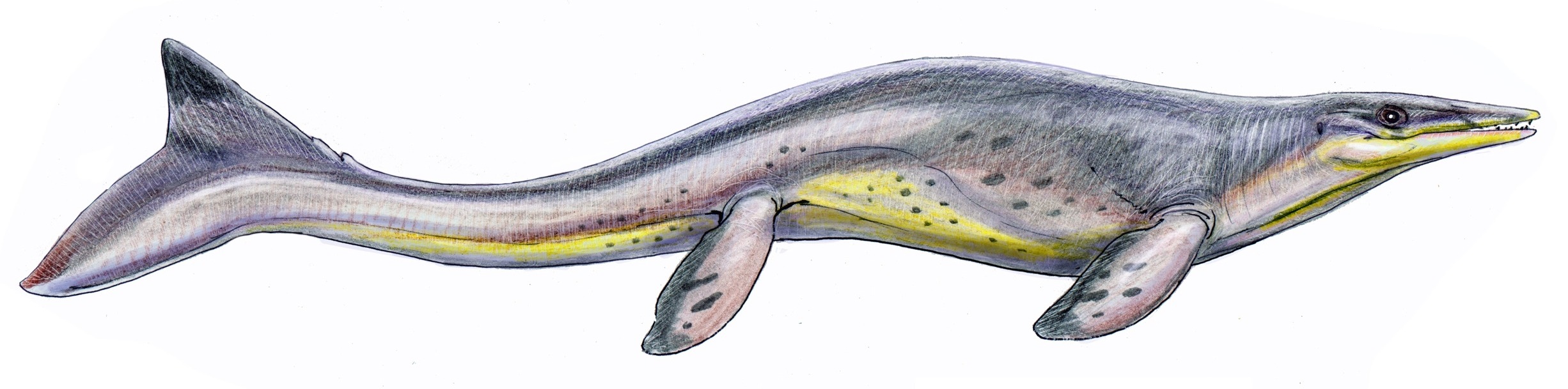
- Restoration of the Late Cretaceous mosasaur Tylosaurus
  †Tylosaurus

== U ==
- †Uatchitodon
  - †Uatchitodon schneideri – type locality for species
- †Uddenia
  - †Uddenia carolinensis
- †Unicardium
  - †Unicardium neusensis

== V ==
- †Variseila – or unidentified comparable form
  - †Variseila meeki
- †Veniella
  - †Veniella conradi
  - †Veniella mullinensis
- †Veriplecia
  - †Veriplecia rugosa
- †Vetericardiella
- †Virginiptera
  - †Virginiptera certa
  - †Virginiptera lativentra – type locality for species
  - †Virginiptera similis
- †Voltzia
  - †Voltzia andrewsii – type locality for species

== W ==
- †Williamsonia
- †Wingatea

== X ==
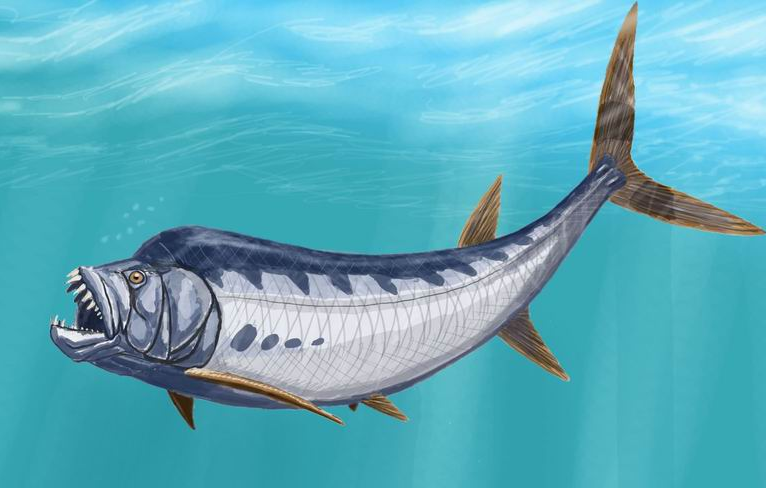
- Life restoration of the Cretaceous bony fish Xiphactinus
  †Xiphactinus
  - †Xiphactinus audax
  - †Xiphactinus vetus

== Y ==
- †Yalea – type locality for genus
  - †Yalea argentata – type locality for species
  - †Yalea rectimedia

== Z ==
- †Zamiostrobus – or unidentified comparable form
  - †Zamiostrobus lissocardus
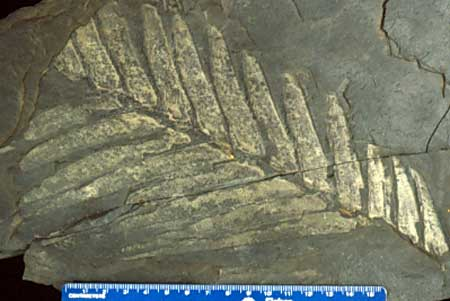
- Fossil of the Early Triassic-Eocene cycad-like frond Zamites
  †Zamites
  - †Zamites powelli
