= Rosieria =

Rosieria Temporal range: Late Triassic

Scientific classification
- Domain: Eukaryota
- Kingdom: Animalia
- Phylum: Chordata
- Clade: Synapsida
- Clade: Therapsida
- Clade: Cynodontia
- Family: †Traversodontidae
- Subfamily: †Arctotraversodontinae
- Genus: †Rosieria; Godefroit and Battail, 1997

Species
- †R. delsatei Godefroit and Battail, 1997 (type)

Extinct genus of cynodonts

Rosieria is an extinct genus of dwarf cynodonts from the Late Triassic of France. It belongs to the family Traversodontidae, a herbivorous group known mainly from Gondwana. The type species R. delsatei was named in 1997 on the basis of a few isolated postcanine teeth found in Saint-Nicolas-de-Port in northeastern France. These teeth were found alongside the teeth of many other cynodonts, including those of Hahnia, Gaumia, and Maubeugia. The small size of the teeth in Saint-Nicolas-de-Port suggest R. delsatei and other species were dwarf cynodonts. Most teeth in the locality belong to insectivores like dromatheriids, while those of R. delsatei and other herbivorous cynodonts are very rare.
