= Scalenodontoides =

Scalenodontoides Temporal range: Norian–Rhaetian

Scientific classification
- Kingdom: Animalia
- Phylum: Chordata
- Clade: Synapsida
- Clade: Therapsida
- Clade: Cynodontia
- Family: †Traversodontidae
- Subfamily: †Gomphodontosuchinae
- Genus: †Scalenodontoides

Type species
- Scalenodontoides macrodontes Crompton & Ellenberger, 1957

Extinct genus of cynodonts

Scalenodontoides is an extinct genus of the herbivorous cynodont family Traversodontidae. It lived during the Late Triassic in what is now South Africa. Its type species is Scalenodontoides macrodontes. It was named in 1957 by A. W. Crompton and F. Ellenberger. Arctotraversodon plemmyrodon was originally classified as a species of Scalenodontoides, but was given its own genus in 1992. It is found in the Scalenodontoides Assemblage Zone of the Elliot Formation, which is named for it. It is one of the geologically youngest traversodontids, alongside the putative traversodontid Boreogomphodon. It is closely related to Exaeretodon and Siriusgnathus, but is distinguished by the presence of a shelf-like expansion of its parietal called the nuchal table. Though the largest known complete skull is only 248 millimetres (9.8 in) long, it may have been the largest non-mammalian cynodont, as an incomplete snout would have belonged to a specimen with an estimated skull length of 617 millimetres (24.3 in).

== Paleoecology ==
At the time this species lived, there was a single continent called Pangea. Dinosaurs already existed, but the dominant group were the pseudosuchians. Melanorosaurus, a primitive sauropodomorph, was discovered along with Scalenodontoides in the Elliot Formation in Lesotho. Although an omnivore, the dinosaur was unlikely to pose a threat to Scalenodontoides due to the large size of the cynodont.

== Description ==
The holotype of S. macrodontes is a mandible collected from the Norian/Rhaetian terrestrial strata of Morobong Hill, Elliot Formation, Lesotho. The structure of the teeth indicates that, like its close relatives, this animal was a herbivore. The skull of this cynodont reaches a length of 248 mm (MNHN 1957.25), making it the size of a large dog. However, there is an incomplete snout (NMQR 3053) likely belonging to S. macrodontes. If similar in proportions to MNHN 1957.25, it would reach 617 mm in length, making it the largest non-mammaliaform cynodont ever discovered.[2]

== Bibliography ==
- Crompton, A W; Ellenberger, F (1957). "On a new cynodont from the Molteno beds and the origin of the Tritylodontids". Annals of the South African Museum. 44: 1–14.
- Gow, C. E.; Hancox, P. J. (1993). "First complete skull of the Late Triassic Scalenodontoides (Reptilia Cynodontia) from southern Africa". New Mexico Museum of Natural History and Science Bulletin. 3: 161–168.
- Miron, Lívia Roese; Pavanatto, Ane Elise Branco; Pretto, Flávio Augusto; Müller, Rodrigo Temp; Dias-da-Silva, Sérgio; Kerber, Leonardo (2020). "Siriusgnathus niemeyerorum (Eucynodontia: Gomphodontia): The youngest South American traversodontid?". Journal of South American Earth Sciences. 97 102394. doi:10.1016/j.jsames.2019.102394. ISSN 0895-9811. S2CID 210628164.
- Pavanatto, Ane Elise Branco; Pretto, Flávio Augusto; Kerber, Leonardo; Müller, Rodrigo Temp; Da-Rosa, Átila Augusto Stock; Dias-da-Silva, Sérgio (2018). "A new Upper Triassic cynodont-bearing fossiliferous site from southern Brazil, with taphonomic remarks and description of a new traversodontid taxon". Journal of South American Earth Sciences. 88: 179–196. doi:10.1016/j.jsames.2018.08.016. ISSN 0895-9811. S2CID 135131520.
- Sues, Hans-Dieter; Hopson, James A.; Shubin, Neil H. (1992-06-10). "Affinities of ?Scalenodontoides plemmyridon Hopson, 1984 (Synapsida: Cynodontia) from the Upper Triassic of Nova Scotia". Journal of Vertebrate Paleontology. 12 (2): 168–171. doi:10.1080/02724634.1992.10011447. ISSN 0272-4634.
- Tolchard, Frederick; Kammerer, Christian F.; Butler, Richard J.; Hendrickx, Christophe; Benoit, Julien; Abdala, Fernando; Choiniere, Jonah N. (2021-07-26). "A new large gomphodont from the Triassic of South Africa and its implications for Gondwanan biostratigraphy". Journal of Vertebrate Paleontology. 41 (2) e1929265. doi:10.1080/02724634.2021.1929265. hdl:11336/147732. ISSN 0272-4634. S2CID 237517965.
- Viglietti, P.A.; McPhee, B.W.; Bordy, E.M.; Sciscio, L.; Barrett, P.M.; Benson, R.B.J.; Wills, S.; Tolchard, F.; Choiniere, J.N. (2020-06-01). "Biostratigraphy of the Scalenodontoides Assemblage Zone (Stormberg Group, Karoo Supergroup), South Africa". South African Journal of Geology. 123 (2): 239–248. doi:10.25131/sajg.123.0017. eISSN 1996-8590. ISSN 1012-0750. S2CID 225846284.
