= Hahnia =

Hahnia may refer to three different genera:

- Hahnia (spider), a genus of spiders in the family Hahniidae
- Hahnia (therapsid), a genus of prehistoric therapsids
- Hahnia (plant), a synonym for a genus of trees, Torminalis
