= List of extinct cycad genera =

Numerous genera of extinct cycads are known, dating variously to geological periods from the Permian to the Cretaceous.

== Alphabetical list ==
- Amuriella Late Jurassic, Russian Far East (leaf fragments)
- Androstrobus Triassic to Cretaceous, worldwide (leaf form genus)
- Antarcticycas Middle Triassic, Antarctica (known from the whole plant)
- ?Anthrophyopsis Late Triassic, worldwide (leaf form genus, possibly a pteridospermatophyte)
- Apoldia Triassic-Jurassic, Europe
- Archaeocycas Early Permian, Texas (leaf with sporophylls)
- Aricycas Late Triassic, Arizona (leaf form genus)
- Beania (=Sphaereda), Triassic to Jurassic, Europe & Central Asia (leaf form genus)
- Behuninia Late Jurassic, Colorado & Utah (fruiting structures)
- Bucklandia Middle Jurassic to Early Cretaceous, Europe and India (leaf form genus)
- Bureja Late Jurassic, Russia
- Bjuvia Late Permian to Jurassic, Europe & North America
- Cavamonocolpites Early Cretaceous, Brazil (pollen)
- Crossozamia Early to Late Permian, China (leaf form genus)
- Ctenis Mesozoic-Paleogene, Worldwide (leaf form genus)
- Ctenozamites Triassic-Cretaceous, worldwide (leaf form genus)
- Cycadenia Triassic, Pennsylvania (trunks)
- Cycadinorachis Late Jurassic, India (rachis)
- Fascisvarioxylon Late Jurassic, India (petrified wood)
- Gymnovulites, Latest Cretaceous/earliest Paleocene, India (seed)
- Heilungia, Late Jurassic to early Cretaceous, Russia & Alaska (leaf form genus)
- Leptocycas Late Triassic, North Carolina & China (known from the whole plant)
- Mesosingeria, Jurassic to Early Cretaceous, Antarctica & Argentina (leaf form genus)
- Michelilloa, Late Triassic, Argentina (stem)
- ?Nikania, Early Cretaceous, Russia (leaf fragments)
- ?Nilssonia, Middle Permian to Late Cretaceous, worldwide (leaf form genus) (possibly not a cycad)
- ?Nilssoniocladus, Early to Late Cretaceous, United States & Russia (stems, likely associated with Nilssonia, possibly deciduous)
- Palaeozamia, Middle Jurassic, England
- Paracycas, Middle Jurassic to Late Jurassic, Europe and Central Asia
- ?Phasmatocycas, Late Carboniferous to Early Permian, Kansas, Texas & New Mexico (leaf with sporophylls)
- Pleiotrichium, Late Cretaceous, Germany (leaf)
- Pseudoctenis, Late Permian to Late Cretaceous, worldwide (leaf form genus)
- Sarmatiella, Late Triassic, Ukraine
- Stangerites, Late Triassic to Early Jurassic, Virginia and Mexico (leaf form genus)
- Sueria, Early Cretaceous, Argentina (leaf)
- Taeniopteris, Carboniferous to Cretaceous, worldwide (polyphyletic leaf form genus, also includes bennettitales and marattialean ferns)
