= Arctotraversodontinae =

Arctotraversodontinae Temporal range: Late Triassic

Scientific classification
- Kingdom: Animalia
- Phylum: Chordata
- Clade: Synapsida
- Clade: Therapsida
- Clade: Cynodontia
- Family: †Traversodontidae
- Subfamily: †Arctotraversodontinae; Hendrickx et al., 2020

Genera
- See text

Extinct subfamily of cynodonts

Arctotraversodontinae is a subfamily of Late Triassic cynodonts belonging to the family Traversodontidae. Members of the subfamily include Arctotraversodon, Boreogomphodon and Plinthogomphodon from North America, and Habayia, Maubeugia, Microscalenodon and Rosieria from Europe.

== Classification ==
The subfamily was erected in 2020 by Hendrickx et al., who defined it as all traversodontids more closely related to Arctotraversodon plemmyridon than to Massetognathus pascuali or Gomphodontosuchus brasiliensis. In their cladistic analysis, they found Arctotraversodontinae to be the sister taxon of the subfamily Gomphodontosuchinae. Below is a cladogram from that analysis:

- Traversodontidae
  - BP/1/5538
  - - CGS JSM 100
    - - Etjoia
      - - Nanogomphodon
        - Scalenodon angustifrons
        - - Traversodontinae
          - - - Andescynodon
              - Pascualgnathus
            - - Mandagomphodon
              - - Scalenodon ribeiroae
                - - Massetognathinae
                  - - Gomphodontosuchinae
                    - Arctotraversodontinae
                      - - Boreogomphodon
                        - Plinthogomphodon
                      - - - Arctotraversodon
                          - Maubeugia
                        - - Microscalenodon
                          - - Habayia
                            - Rosieria
