= Mandagomphodon =

Mandagomphodon Temporal range: Anisian ~247–242 Ma

Scientific classification
- Domain: Eukaryota
- Kingdom: Animalia
- Phylum: Chordata
- Clade: Synapsida
- Clade: Therapsida
- Clade: Cynodontia
- Family: †Traversodontidae
- Subfamily: †Arctotraversodontinae
- Genus: †Mandagomphodon; Hopson, 2013

Type species
- †Scalenodon hirschsoni (Crompton, 1972)

Extinct genus of cynodonts

Mandagomphodon is an extinct genus of traversodontid cynodonts from the Middle Triassic Lifua Member of the Manda Beds of Ruhuhu Valley, Tanzania. The type species Mandagomphodon hirschsoni was named by Crompton in 1972 as a species referable to Scalenodon. Later studies, including a 2003 phylogenetic analysis of traversodontid relationships, did not find the species of Scalenodon from the Manda Formation to form a single clade, meaning that many were not referable to the genus. The study suggested that S. hirschsoni had more in common with other traversodontids like Luangwa. S. attridgei was viewed as a possible synonym of S. charigi, which was also found to be only distantly related to S. angustifrons. Therefore, a new generic name Mandagomphodon was erected for S. hirschsoni by James A. Hopson in 2013.
