= Arctotraversodon =

Arctotraversodon Temporal range: Late Triassic

Scientific classification
- Domain: Eukaryota
- Kingdom: Animalia
- Phylum: Chordata
- Clade: Synapsida
- Clade: Therapsida
- Clade: Cynodontia
- Family: †Traversodontidae
- Subfamily: †Arctotraversodontinae
- Genus: †Arctotraversodon; Sues et al., 1992

Species
- †A. plemmyridon (Hopson, 1984 [originally ?Scalenodontoides plemmyridon]) (type)

Extinct genus of cynodonts

Arctotraversodon is an extinct genus of traversodontid cynodonts from the Late Triassic of Canada. Fossils first described from the Wolfville Formation in Nova Scotia in 1984 represented the first known traversodontid from North America. The type and only species is A. plemmyridon and is represented by teeth and several dentary bones.

== Description and history ==
Arctotraversodon was first tentatively placed in the genus Scalenodontoides as a new species, ?Scalenodontoides plemmyridon. Only dentary bones and a few teeth were known when it was first named. Postcanine teeth, the primary diagnostic material of most traversodontids, were not known for ?S. plemmyridon. Few available features could diagnose ?S. plemmyridon as its own species, but the bones and teeth were clearly different from those of other traversodontids. A traversodontid postcanine tooth was later found from the same formation that was distinct from those of all other species. Unlike other traversodontid lower postcanines which have two cusps on either side of their crowns, these teeth had three cusps. The traversodontid Boreogomphodon from the Turkey Branch Formation of Virginia was later found to have three cusps on its lower postcanines, showing that North American traversodontids were distinct from those in Africa and South America.

The species was assigned to its own genus, Arctotraversodon, in 1992. Arctotraversodon means "northern Traversodon" in reference to its northern location and close relation with Traversodon. "Arcto" (from the Greek arktos) can also mean "bear", as the holotype specimen was once informally called the "bear jaw." Features of an upper postcanine tooth that was found on a sea cliff in Nova Scotia were used to diagnose the new genus.
