= Plinthogomphodon =

Plinthogomphodon Temporal range: Late Triassic

Scientific classification
- Kingdom: Animalia
- Phylum: Chordata
- Clade: Synapsida
- Clade: Therapsida
- Clade: Cynodontia
- Family: †Traversodontidae
- Subfamily: †Arctotraversodontinae
- Genus: †Plinthogomphodon; Sues et al., 1999

Species
- †P. herpetairus Sues et al., 1999 (type)

Extinct genus of cynodonts

Plinthogomphodon is an extinct genus of traversodontid cynodonts from the Late Triassic of the eastern United States. Fossils have been found from the Deep River basin of North Carolina, part of the larger Newark Supergroup. It is known from a single eroded snout. The type and only species is P. herpetairus.

== Description and history ==
Plinthogomphodon was named in 1999. The name means "brick molar tooth" in Greek, as it was found in mudstone used to make bricks and its postcanine teeth resemble molars. The type species is P. herpetairus, meaning "companion of reptiles" from the Greek herpeton ("reptile") and hetairos ("companion"). The name alludes to the close proximity of the holotype specimen to the remains of a rauisuchian (Postosuchus alisonae) and a sphenosuchian archosaur (Dromicosuchus) when it was first discovered. It is thought that the Plinthogomphodon had been previously consumed by the Postosuchus, which died and was buried when pursuing the Dromicosuchus.

The holotype only preserves the underside of the snout, as the dorsal surface has eroded away. The tip of the snout is broad, but it constricts behind the canines. The tips of most teeth are also worn away, except for two postcanine teeth that had not yet erupted and were exposed during the fossil's preparation for study. Because the teeth had not yet emerged, the individual was probably a juvenile. Like most traversodontids, Plinthogomphodon has a pair of large canine teeth and several wide, cusped postcanine teeth. The postcanines of Plinthogomphodon are much wider than they are long and closely packed together. Based on the postcanine that had not erupted in the holotype, the postcanine of Plinthogomphodon has three main cusps: a lingual cusp near the mouth, a slightly smaller central cusp, and a relatively large buccal cusp near the cheek. There are also smaller accessory cusps in front of the buccal cusp.
