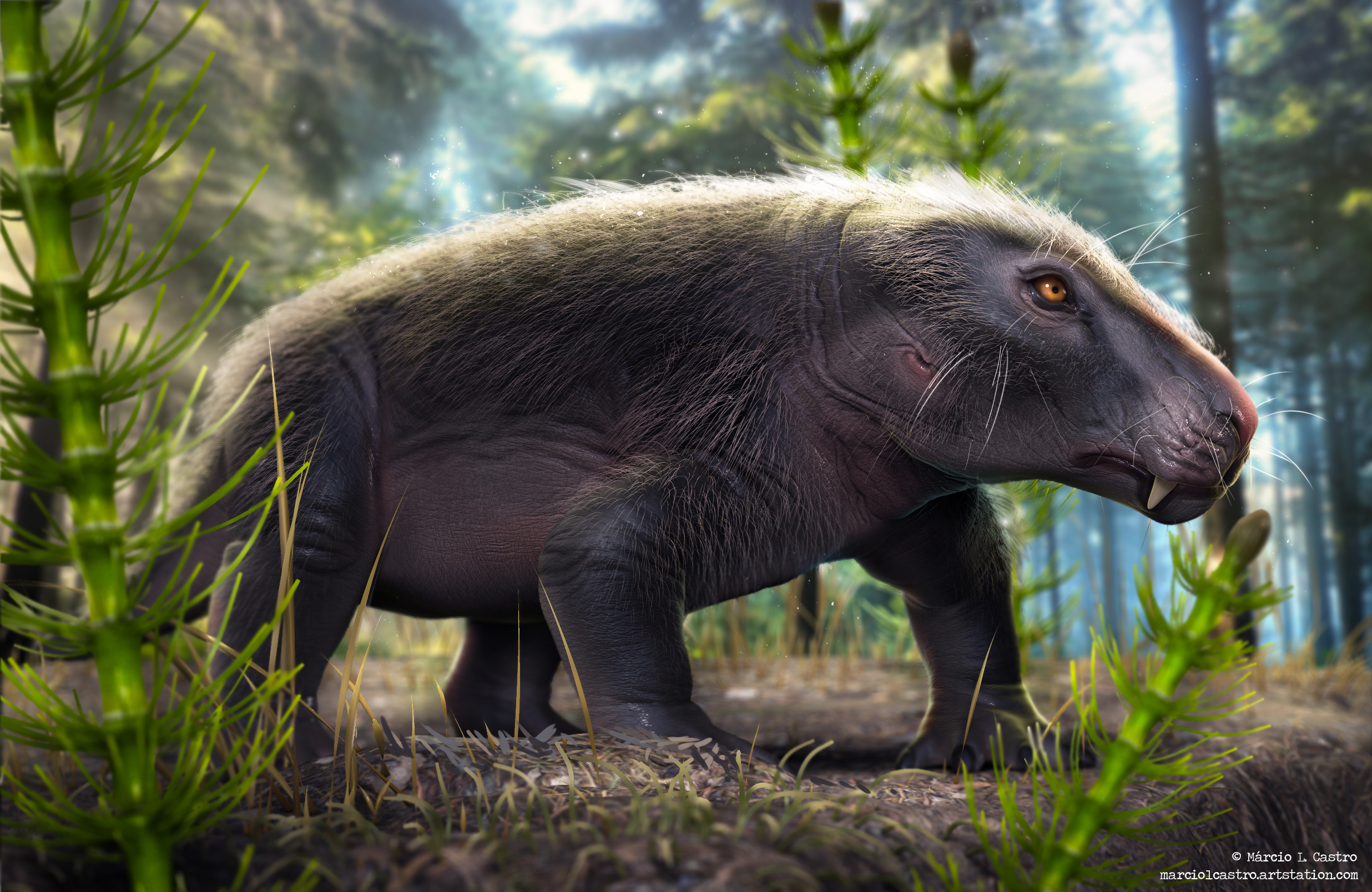
- Life restoration

Scientific classification
- Domain: Eukaryota
- Kingdom: Animalia
- Phylum: Chordata
- Clade: Synapsida
- Clade: Therapsida
- Clade: Cynodontia
- Family: †Traversodontidae
- Subfamily: †Gomphodontosuchinae
- Genus: †Siriusgnathus; Pavanatto et al. 2018
- Species: †S. niemeyerorum

Binomial name
- †Siriusgnathus niemeyerorum Pavanatto et al. 2018

= Siriusgnathus =

Siriusgnathus Temporal range: Carnian ~232–222 Ma

Extinct genus of cynodonts

Siriusgnathus is a traversodontid cynodont from the Carnian channel sandstones and mudstones of the Candelária Formation, belonging to the Santa Maria Supersequence of the Paraná Basin in southeastern Brazil. It includes one species, Siriusgnathus niemeyerorum and was described in 2018. The species epithet refers to the Niemeyer locality in Agudo, Rio Grande do Sul. It was found together with various archosauromorphs, dinosauromorphs and other cynodonts, such as Brasilitherium riograndensis, Brasilodon quadrangularis, Irajatherium hernandezi and Prozostrodon brasiliensis.

== See also ==
- 2018 in paleontology
