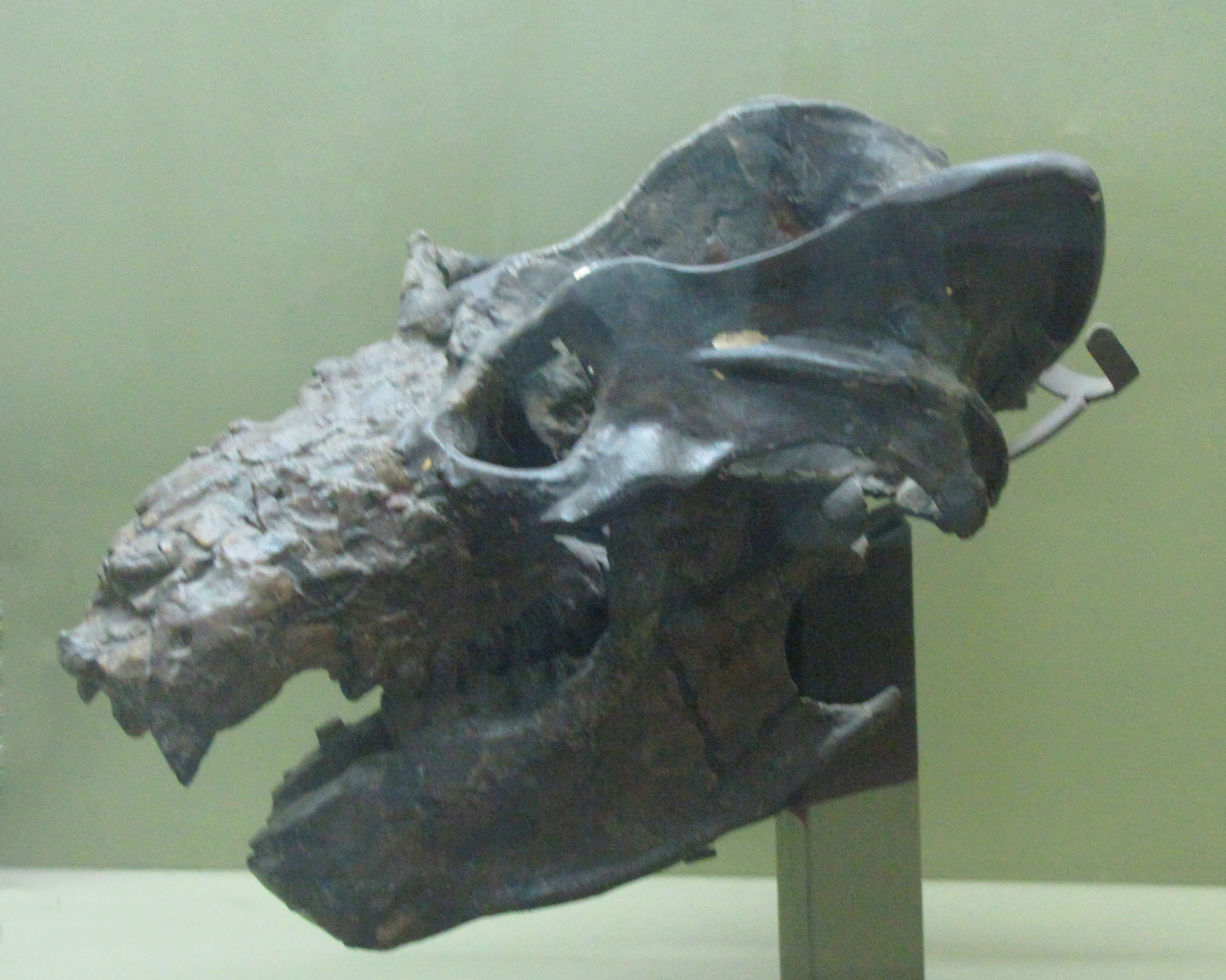
- Skull of the gomphodontosuchine Exaeretodon

Scientific classification
- Domain: Eukaryota
- Kingdom: Animalia
- Phylum: Chordata
- Clade: Synapsida
- Clade: Therapsida
- Clade: Cynodontia
- Family: †Traversodontidae
- Subfamily: †Gomphodontosuchinae; Watson and Romer, 1956

Subgroups
- See text.

= Gomphodontosuchinae =

Gomphodontosuchinae Temporal range: Triassic

Subfamily of traversodontid cynodonts

Gomphodontosuchinae is a subfamily of Triassic traversodontid cynodonts. It includes the genera Gomphodontosuchus (the type genus), Exaeretodon, Santagnathus, Siriusgnathus, Menadon, Proexaeretodon, Protuberum, Ruberodon and Scalenodontoides.

Below is a cladogram showing the phylogenetic relationships of gomphodontosuchines from Kammerer et al. (2008):

- Traversodontidae
  - Luangwa
  - Scalenodon
  - - Pascualgnathus
    - - Traversodon
      - - Andescynodon
        - - Dadadon
          - - Santacruzodon
            - Massetognathus
          - Gomphodontosuchinae
            - Gomphodontosuchus
            - - Menadon
              - - Exaeretodon
                - Scalenodontoides
