= Maubeugia =

Maubeugia Temporal range: Late Triassic

Scientific classification
- Domain: Eukaryota
- Kingdom: Animalia
- Phylum: Chordata
- Clade: Synapsida
- Clade: Therapsida
- Clade: Cynodontia
- Family: †Traversodontidae
- Subfamily: †Arctotraversodontinae
- Genus: †Maubeugia; Godefroit and Battail, 1997

Species
- †M. lotharingica Godefroit and Battail, 1997 (type)

Extinct genus of cynodonts

Maubeugia is an extinct genus of traversodontid cynodonts from the Late Triassic of France. Isolated postcanine teeth are known from Saint-Nicolas-de-Port in northeastern France. The type species M. lotharingica was named in 1997. Many other cynodont teeth were found alongside those of Maubeugia, including those of dromatheriids, probainognathids, and other traversodontids. The size of its teeth indicates that Maubeugia was a dwarf traversodontid. The deposit in which the teeth were found indicates that it lived along the shoreline of an ocean.
