= Leptocycas =

Leptocycas Temporal range: Late Triassic, ~Carnian–Rhaetian

Scientific classification
- Kingdom: Plantae
- Clade: Embryophytes
- Clade: Tracheophytes
- Clade: Spermatophytes
- Clade: Gymnospermae
- Division: Cycadophyta
- Class: Cycadopsida
- Order: Cycadales
- Family: Zamiaceae
- Genus: †Leptocycas; Delevoryas & Hope (1971)

Type species
- Leptocycas gracilis Delevoryas & Hope (1971)

Species
- †Leptocycas gracilis; †Leptocycas yangcaogouensis

Extinct genus of cycads

Leptocycas is a genus of extinct cycad from the Late Triassic of North America and China that bears heavy resemblance to the extant Dioon. It is represented by two species.

== Description ==
Leptocycas is characterized by a long, unbranching stem which could grow to 3-5 cm wide in L. gracilis and 7-8 cm wide in L. yangcaogouensis. Both species bear a crown of leaves like that of Pseudoctenis alongside lanceolate and obovate cataphylls. Individual pinnae grow to around 4.5 cm long and 3.5 mm wide and there is no relation to pinnae position on each side of the rachis, with some alternating and others appearing opposite each other. The bases of petioles are present along the length of the rest of the stem, but neither leaves nor cataphylls are present, implying they are shed as the plant grows. The end of the stem is adorned with a cone, with male cones bending downward' and female cones being ovoid in shape and remaining upright.
