= "Hahnia" obliqua =

"Hahnia" obliqua Temporal range: Rhaetian

Scientific classification
- Kingdom: Animalia
- Phylum: Chordata
- Clade: Synapsida
- Clade: Therapsida
- Clade: Cynodontia
- Family: incertae sedis
- Species: †"Hahnia" obliqua Godefroit & Battail, 1997

Binomial name
- "Hahnia" obliqua

Extinct species of cynodont

"Hahnia" obliqua is a poorly known species of meat-eating stem-mammals (cynodonts) that lived during the Upper Triassic in Europe. It is based on tiny, isolated teeth, and its affinities with other cynodonts are unclear. The generic name is not valid, thus the quotation marks. The name Hahnia has already been used for a spider. The authors are aware of this, and will doubtless come up with a new name sometime in the future.

The genus "Hahnia" ("for Hahn") was named by Pascal Godefroit and Bernard Battail in 1997 based on a single species.

Fossil remains of the species "Hahnia" obliqua have been found in the Norian (late) - Rhaetian (early) (Upper Triassic)-age strata of Saint-Nicolas-de-Port in France. Apart from not yet having a proper name, these teeth look rather boring. The crown slopes backwards and has three cusps, though that's more apparent when seen from above than it is from the side. The largest cusp, the middle one, has a "somewhat blunt" apex. Its two colleagues, which "are not very well separated from the main cusp", are "very blunt", (quotes from Godfroit & Battauk 1997, p. 588). "There is no constriction between the crown and the root."

Boring looking or not, these were nevertheless effective for cutting up small portions of prey. The authors discuss similarities with teeth of galesaurids (something like forerunners of the eucynodonts), Cynognathus, chiniquodontids, tritheledontids, dromatheriids and various other small cynodonts of the European Upper Triassic; They are all carnivores of one size or another. However, as there are also clear differences to the tiny teeth of "Hahnia", the authors plump for Cynodontia incertae sedis (aka of some kind or other).
