= Triassic =

First period of the Mesozoic Era

- 251.902 ± 0.024 – 201.4 ± 0.2 Ma
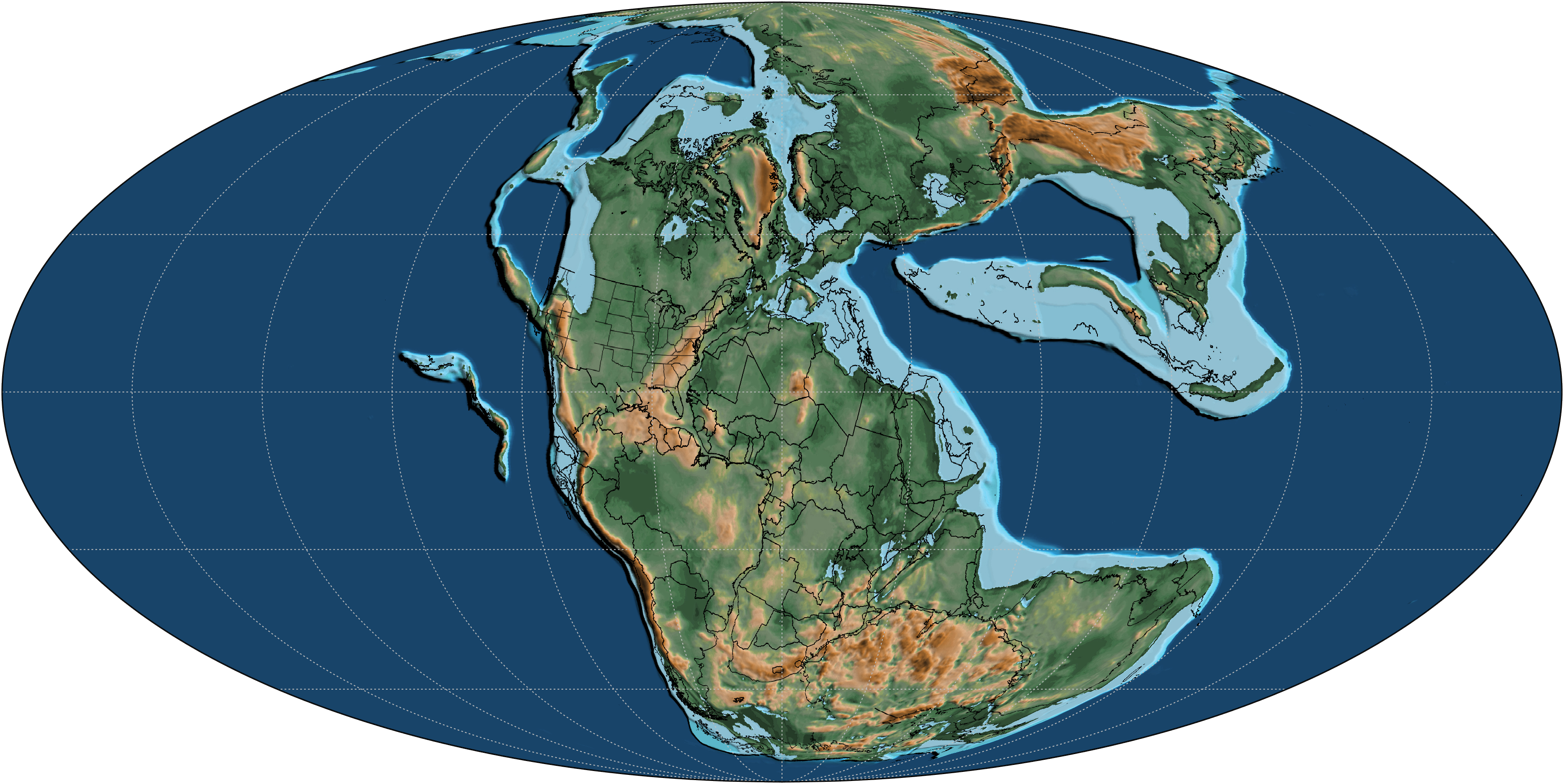
- A paleomap of Earth as it appeared 225 Ma during the Norian Age of the Late Triassic Epoch

Chronology
← / Triassic–Jurassic extinction event; ← / Scleractinian corals & calcified sponges; ← / Carnian pluvial episode; ← / Manicouagan impact; ← / Coals return; ← / Full recovery of woody trees; ← / Smithian–Spathian boundary event; ← / Permian-Triassic extinction event
Subdivision of the Triassic according to the ICS, as of 2024. Vertical axis scale: Millions of years ago

Etymology
- Name formality: Formal

Usage information
- Celestial body: Earth
- Regional usage: Global (ICS)
- Time scale(s) used: ICS Time Scale

Definition
- Chronological unit: Period
- Stratigraphic unit: System
- Time span formality: Formal
- Lower boundary definition: First appearance of the conodont Hindeodus parvus
- Lower boundary GSSP: Meishan, Zhejiang, China; 31.0798°N 119.7058°E
- Lower GSSP ratified: 2001
- Upper boundary definition: First appearance of the ammonite Psiloceras spelae tirolicum
- Upper boundary GSSP: Kuhjoch section, Karwendel mountains, Northern Calcareous Alps, Austria; 47.4839°N 11.5306°E
- Upper GSSP ratified: 2010

The Triassic (/traɪˈæsɪk/ try-A-sik) is a geologic period and a stratigraphic system that spans 50.5 million years from the end of the Permian Period 251.902 Ma (million years ago) to the beginning of the Jurassic Period 201.4 Ma. The Triassic Period is the first and shortest geologic period of the Mesozoic Era, and the seventh period of the Phanerozoic Eon. The start and the end of the Triassic Period featured major extinction events.

Chronologically, the Triassic Period is divided into three epochs: (i) the Early Triassic, (ii) the Middle Triassic, and (iii) the Late Triassic. The Triassic Period began after the Permian–Triassic extinction event that much reduced the biosphere of planet Earth. The fossil record of the Triassic Period presents three categories of organisms: (i) animals that survived the Permian–Triassic extinction event, (ii) new animals that briefly flourished in the Triassic biosphere, and (iii) new animals that evolved and dominated the Mesozoic Era. Reptiles, especially archosaurs, were the chief terrestrial vertebrates during this time. A specialized group of archosaurs, called dinosaurs, first appeared in the Late Triassic but did not become dominant until the succeeding Jurassic Period. Archosaurs that became dominant in this period were primarily pseudosuchians, relatives and ancestors of modern crocodilians, while some archosaurs specialized in flight, the first time among vertebrates, becoming the pterosaurs. Therapsids, the dominant vertebrates of the preceding Permian period, saw a brief surge in diversification in the Triassic, with dicynodonts and cynodonts quickly becoming dominant, but they declined throughout the period with the majority becoming extinct by the end. However, the first stem-group mammals (mammaliamorphs), themselves a specialized subgroup of cynodonts, appeared during the Triassic and would survive the extinction event, allowing them to radiate during the Jurassic. Amphibians were primarily represented by the temnospondyls, giant aquatic predators that had survived the end-Permian extinction and saw a new burst of diversification in the Triassic, before going extinct by the end; however, early crown-group lissamphibians (including stem-group frogs, salamanders and caecilians) also became more common during the Triassic and survived the extinction event. The earliest known neopterygian fish, including early holosteans and teleosts, appeared near the beginning of the Triassic, and quickly diversified to become among the dominant groups of fish in both freshwater and marine habitats.

The vast supercontinent of Pangaea dominated the globe during the Triassic, but in the latest Triassic (Rhaetian) and Early Jurassic it began to gradually rift into two separate landmasses: Laurasia to the north and Gondwana to the south. The global climate during the Triassic was mostly hot and dry, with deserts spanning much of Pangaea's interior. However, the climate shifted and became more humid as Pangaea began to drift apart. The end of the period was marked by yet another major mass extinction, the Triassic–Jurassic extinction event, that wiped out many groups, including most pseudosuchians, and allowed dinosaurs to assume dominance in the Jurassic.

== Etymology ==
The Triassic was named in 1834 by Friedrich Alberti, after a succession of three distinct rock layers (Greek triás meaning 'triad') that are widespread in southern Germany: the lower Buntsandstein (colourful sandstone), the middle Muschelkalk (shell-bearing limestone) and the upper Keuper (coloured clay).

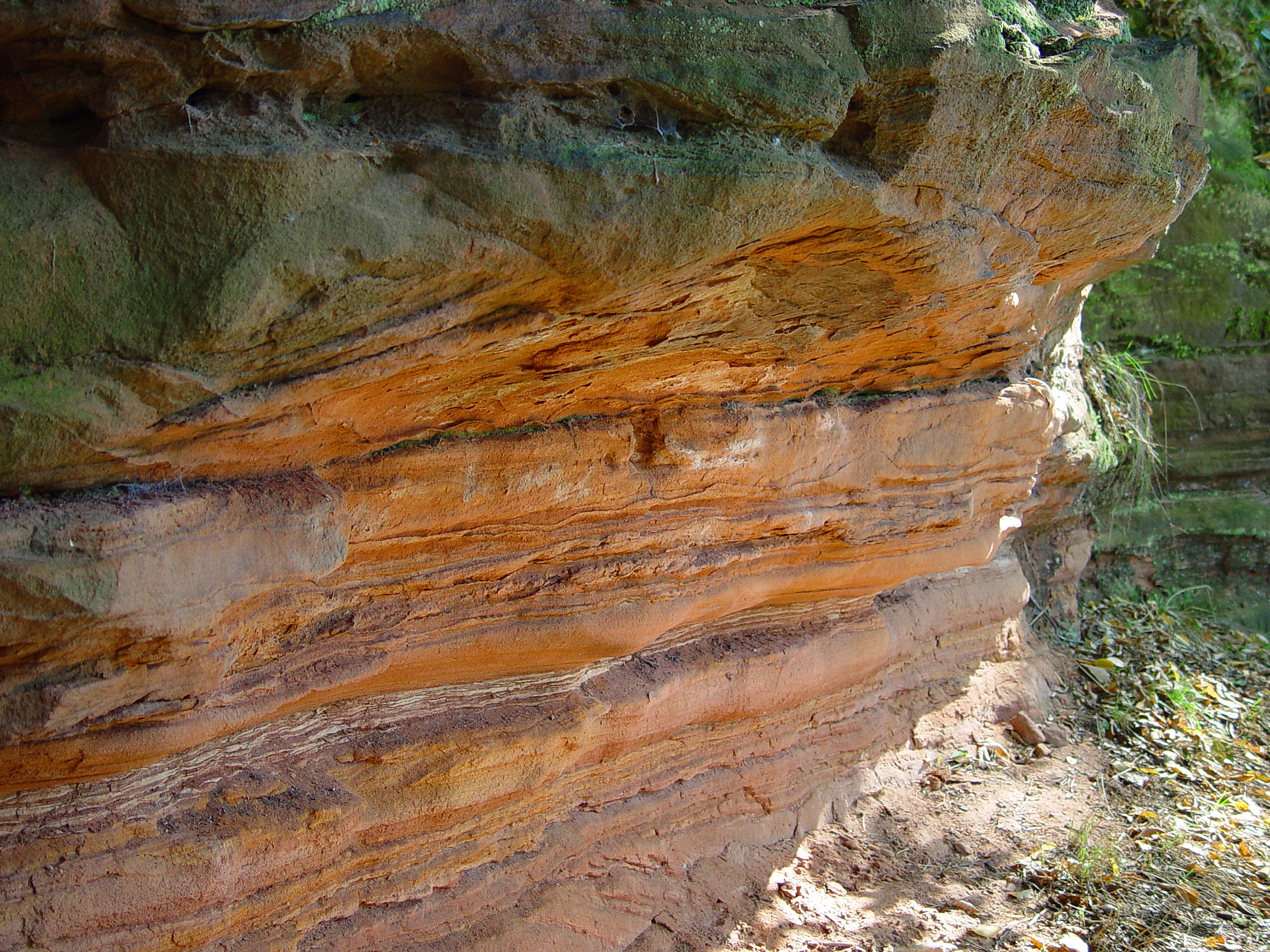
Early Triassic sandstone (Buntsandstein) near Stadtroda, Germany

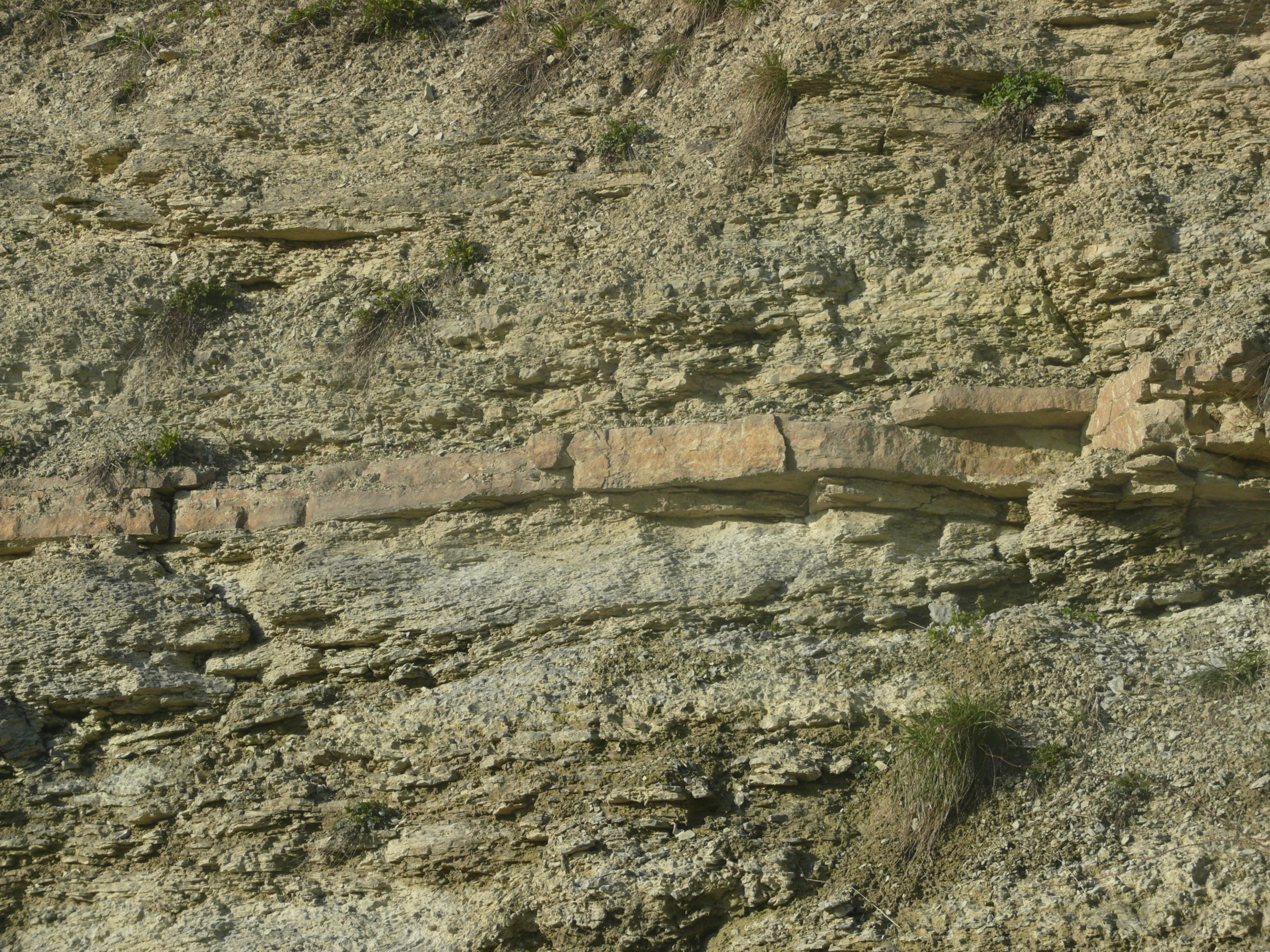
Middle Triassic Muschelkalk (shell-bearing limestone) near Dörzbach, Germany

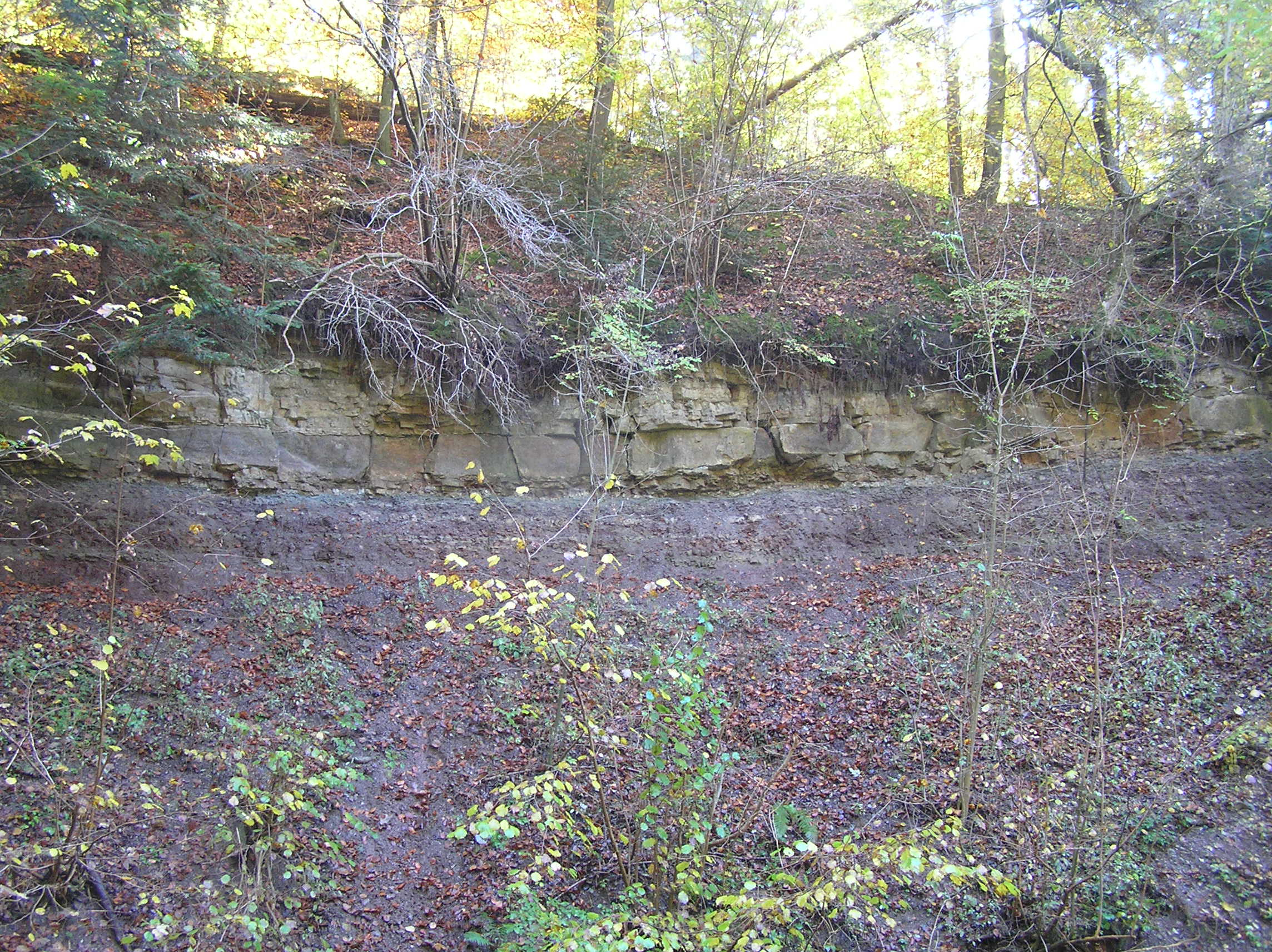
Late Triassic Steigerwald Formation and overlying Hassberge Formation in Schönbuch, Germany

== Dating and subdivisions ==
On the geologic time scale, the Triassic is usually divided into Early, Middle, and Late Triassic Epochs, and the corresponding rocks are referred to as Lower, Middle, or Upper Triassic. The faunal stages from the youngest to oldest are:

Series/epoch	Stage/age	Lower boundary
Lower/Early Jurassic	Hettangian	201.4 ± 0.2 Ma
Upper/Late Triassic	Rhaetian	205.7 Ma
Upper/Late Triassic	Norian	227.3 Ma
Upper/Late Triassic	Carnian	237 Ma
Middle Triassic	Ladinian	241.464 ± 0.28 Ma
Middle Triassic	Anisian	247 Ma
Lower/Early Triassic	Olenekian	250.8 Ma
Lower/Early Triassic	Induan	251.902 ± 0.024 Ma

== Paleogeography ==
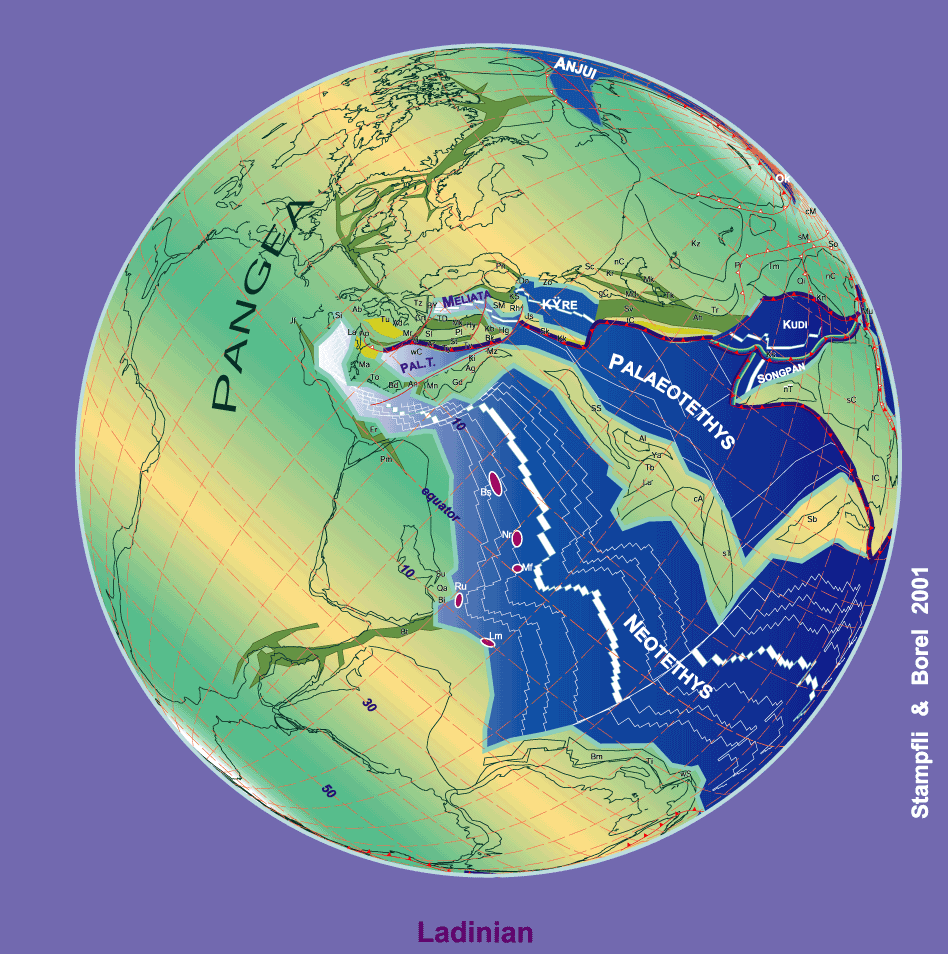
View of the Tethys area during the Ladinian stage (230 Ma)

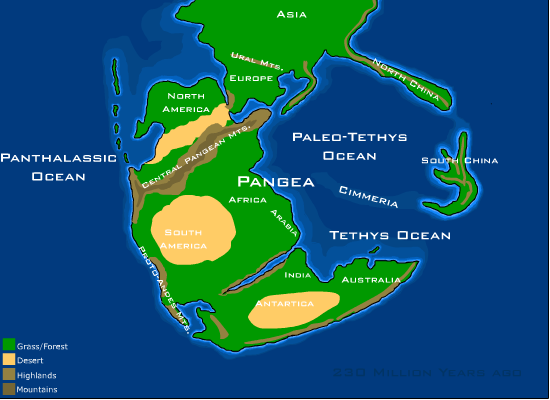
230 Ma continental reconstruction

At the beginning of the Triassic, all the major continents were amalgamated into the supercontinent of Pangea. Centred on the equator, this stretched in an arc from the north to south polar regions with Laurussia in the north and Gondwana in the south. The Paleo- and Neo-Tethys oceans lay within the arc of the supercontinent with the vast Panthalassa Ocean beyond. North China and Amuria, and South China were separated from Pangea by the Paleoasian Ocean, but this closed by the Late Triassic.

Pangea was surrounded by subduction zones that dipped beneath the supercontinent. The great mountain ranges that marked the Late Paleozoic continental collisions were largely eroded and were being replaced by regions of thinned crust that lay along the lines of the future Atlantic, Indian and Southern oceans.

The supercontinent changed motion from drifting westward to rotating counterclockwise during late Permian. This continued until the Carnian (c. 230 Ma), after which it resumed the westward motion. These changes in motion were triggered by the opening of the Neo-Tethys, and closing of the Paleo-Tethys respectively, and affected tectonic regimes particularly along the southern and western margins.

The narrow Cimmerian terranes that had rifted from the northern margin of Gondwana in the Permian continued to drift northwards; the Paleo-Tethys Ocean closing in front of them and the Neo-Tethys opening behind.

Eruptions of the Siberian Traps Large Igneous Province (LIP) persisted into the Early Triassic and the Central Atlantic Magmatic Province (CAMP) were active by the Late Triassic as a prelude to seafloor spreading in the Central Atlantic at the boundary of the Triassic and Jurassic.

=== Northern Pangea (Laurussia) ===
In northern-eastern Pangea, the Siberian Traps LIP continued to erupt into the Middle Triassic. Lower Triassic major deltaic systems (including the Triassic Boreal Ocean delta plain) advanced across the shallow Arctic Ocean. Their catchment areas the high ground of the Urals, Fennoscandinavia, the Canada-Greenland Shield and the Lomonosov High. During the Late Triassic, in response to the opening of the Central Atlantic to the south, tectonic movements between North America and Baltica led to convergence in the High Arctic with uplift, folding and thrusting in the Barents Sea and North Siberian margin.

Major extensional tectonic movements, that began in the late Permian, continued across Laurussia from North/Central Europe in the east to eastern Canada in the west, with north-south trending graben systems developing across Europe, including further subsidence in the Northern and Southern Permian basins. Lower Triassic sediments deposited in these basins are continental to brackish marine in nature. They are overlain by shallow marine carbonates and mudstones and evaporites of the Zechstein Sea.

Further south, during the Norian, the opening of the Central Atlantic led to the formation of narrow, deep water basins in the Eastern Mediterranean area. Corsica, Sardinia, Calabria, and the Balearic terranes were attached to Europe, whilst Apulia, Adria, and the terranes of southern Turkey remained attached to the African plate.

Along the western margin of Laurussia, a continental magmatic arc extended from the southwestern United States to the Arctic with an associated continental-scale foreland basin system. Localised back-arc basins developed within this, in regions of extension. Along the northern section of the margin, the Permian to Early Triassic counterclockwise rotation of Pangea resulted in the closure of the narrow Slide Mountain Ocean and the Sonoma orogeny. In south, it led to a reduction in the dip of the subducting slab and thickening of the continental crust.

=== Southern Pangea (Gondwana) ===
Much of Africa was stable and above sea level, with only a few Triassic-aged lake sediments known, although along the northern coast marine sediments were deposited during periods of higher sea levels.

Northeast-southwest trending rifting along the eastern edge of Africa between Madagascar (Indian plate) and eastern Africa (Somali plate) continued from the Late Carboniferous into the Triassic, with substantial mountains rising along the edge of the rift and the formation of a series of pull-apart basins. Gradual marine incursions from the Neo-Tethys resulted in the deposition of Lower and Middle Triassic marine sediments in these basins. Upper Triassic sediments are continental in nature and this rift system ultimately failed and a new north-south trending rift system developed in the Jurassic.

The opening of the Neo-Tethys created passive margins along the Arabian and Indian margins. Rifting in the Neo-Tethys extended westwards between the Pontides and Taurides terranes of Turkey during the Late Triassic. The Tethyan Himalayan block remained attached to India but was separated by the thinned crust of Greater India, the northern margin of which supplied sediments to the passive margin.

The counterclockwise rotation of Pangea precipitated dextral transpression across the NNE-SSW trending, west-dipping subduction zone, along the eastern Australian margin, which culminated in the Hunter-Bowen orogeny (c. 260-230 Ma). Following this, the magmatic arc rotated to north-south and compression gave way to extension. This was accompanied by subduction rollback and back-arc basin formation.

Along the southwestern margin of South America, low plate convergence and subduction rates, triggered by the assembly and rotation of Pangea, resulted in subduction rollback and extension across the back-arc region. This generated large amounts of felsic magmatism. These extensional forces stretched across the continent with the formation of large northwest-trending basins with thick sedimentary deposits and the extension related magmatism.

=== Closure of the Paleo-Tethys ===
The Paleo-Tethys ocean formed as the continents surrounding it assembled to form Pangea in the Late Palaeozoic. The Eurasian sector of Pangea lay along its north and northwestern margin. To the northeast, the narrow Paleoasian Ocean (a branch of the Paleo-Tethys) lay between Eurasia, and North China and Tarim, and to the east, South China and Annamia (Southeast Asia). To the south were the Cimmerian terranes (Central Iran, Qiangtang(north Tibet), Lhasa (south Tibet), and Sibumasu (eastern Myanmar, Thailand, Malay peninsula and Sumatra). These terranes had rifted from northeastern Gondwana during the Permian. As they drifted northwards through the Triassic, the Paleo-Tethys closed in front of them, and the Neotethys opened behind.

The Paleo-Tethys was being consumed by subduction zones along the southern margin of North China, much of the Eurasian margin, and along the northern margin of the Qiangtang-Annamia and Lhasa-Sibumasu blocks.

Collisions between Annamia and South China (c. 246-230 Ma); between Sibumasu and South China–Annamia (c. 240-230 Ma); and, between Qiangtang and Lhasa (c. 250–230 Ma) resulted in the Indosinian orogeny and the formation of a single large Eastern Asian continent. At about the same time (c. 240-230 Ma), the final closure of the Paleoasian Ocean led to the collision of Tarim and North China with the Kazakhstan and Siberian regions of Pangea, to form the Central Asian orogenic belt. South China collided with North China (c. 220 Ma), forming the Central China orogenic belt. The segment of the Paleo-Tethys between North China and Qiangtang may never have fully closed, but was filled with Permo-Triassic turbidites preserved in the West Kunlun and Bayanhar belts of the Central China orogenic belt.

The amalgamation of these East Asian blocks with Pangea in the Late Triassic maximised the land area of the supercontinent. It coincided with a period of dramatic climate change and the development of the megamonsoon, although the relationship between these is the subject of ongoing research.

The western Paleo-Tethys remained open until about 205 Ma, when the Iranian blocks collided with the Turan platform, on the southern margin of Eurasia, resulting in the Cimmerian orogeny. This extended from the Anatolian Plateau in the northwest, and merged with the Indosinian orogenic belt in the east. Late Triassic deformation across the Eastern Mediterranean area and much of the Middle East was complex, with regional scale strike-slip faulting and continued subduction below the Iranian margin.

=== Opening of the Central Atlantic ===
Beginning in the latest Permian, a broad zone of lithospheric extension developed across Pangea along the line of the future Central Atlantic Ocean. The location of this rifting followed the pre-existing structures of the Variscan orogeny, and began immediately after the orogenic collapse of the Variscan belt. Extension began in the northern Central Atlantic region in the Anisian, and in the southern Central Atlantic in the Carnian.

Major rift basins formed along the present-day eastern North American margin from Florida to Newfoundland (Newark Supergroup basins), and along the Europe/African margin (Moroccan and Iberian basins). The Moroccan basins are the equivalent of Nova Scotian basins, and the Iberian the equivalent of the Newfoundland basins. These basins formed broad depressions on the continental crust that extended for hundreds of kilometres across central Pangea, with localised faulting formed sub-basins. The basins were filled by mainly continental deposits from regional-scale river systems and lakes, with only minor, late marine incursions in some areas.

The period of rifting came to an end with the emplacement of the Central Atlantic Magmatic Province (CAMP) around 201 Ma. This was followed by seafloor spreading and the opening of the Central Atlantic Ocean. The CAMP is one of the largest LIPs and covered a region of about 10 million km^{2} across North America, northeastern South America, northwestern Africa, and southwestern Europe. The magmatism produced dense dyke swarms, with individual dykes up to 800 km long, massive sill complexes, and lava fields that covered several hundred kilometres. Despite its size, the period of magmatism was brief, lasting only about 1 million years. Such intense igneous activity indicates widespread mantle melting, rather than a simple plume within the mantle. The varied petrological composition of the CAMP magmatism reflects local contamination of the upper mantle by continental lithosphere, including partial melting of previously subducted slabs. The magmatism, with its large scale injection of carbon and sulphur into the atmosphere, precipitated volcanic winters. This was followed by longer-term climate warming and ocean acidification, which caused the end-Triassic mass extinction.

=== Panthalassic Ocean ===
Although no direct evidence remains, Panthalassa is thought to have been divided into three major tectonic plates: the Farallon; Izanagi; and, Phoenix. These were separated by oceanic spreading ridges. In the northeast, the smaller Cache Creek plate was being subducted beneath the western margin of North America, and beneath the Farallon plate to the south.

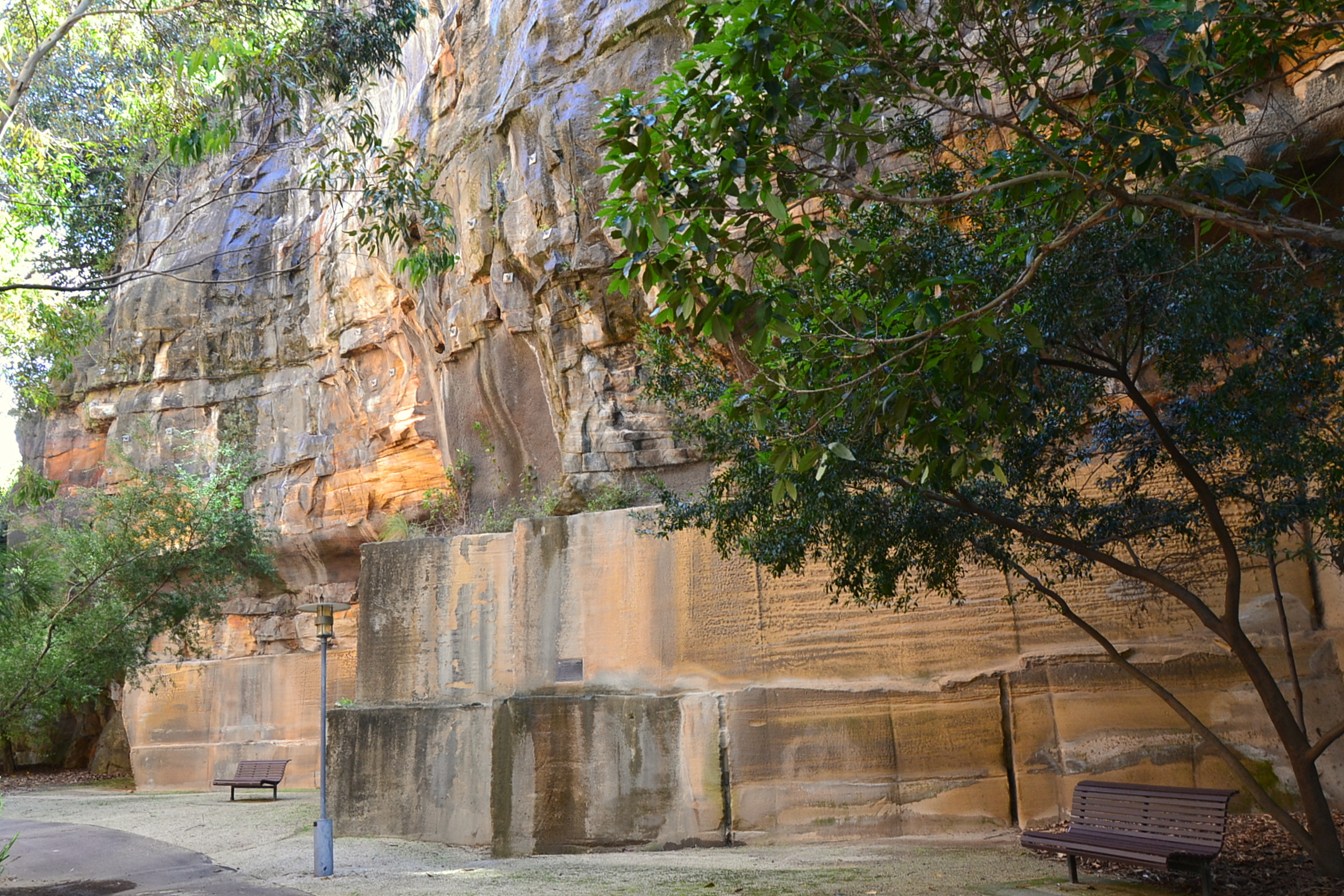
Sydney, Australia lies on Triassic shales and sandstones. Almost all of the exposed rocks around Sydney belong to the Triassic Sydney sandstone.

=== Paleooceanography ===
Eustatic sea level in the Triassic was consistently low compared to the other geological periods. The beginning of the Triassic was around present sea level, rising to about 10–20 metres (33–66 ft) above present-day sea level during the Early and Middle Triassic. Sea level rise accelerated in the Ladinian, culminating with a sea level up to 50 metres (164 ft) above present-day levels during the Carnian. Sea level began to decline in the Norian, reaching a low of 50 metres (164 ft) below present sea level during the mid-Rhaetian. Low global sea levels persisted into the earliest Jurassic. The long-term sea level trend is superimposed by 22 sea level drop events widespread in the geologic record, mostly of minor (less than 25-metre (82 ft)) and medium (25–75-metre (82–246 ft)) magnitudes. A lack of evidence for Triassic continental ice sheets suggest that glacial eustasy is unlikely to be the cause of these changes. It has generally been assumed that the cause was changes in volume of the global ocean basin due to variations in oceanic volcanism, with largest volumes occurring in volcanism's absence when the ocean basins were subsiding. Variation in water and sediment delivery to the oceans, with higher sea levels during pluvial eras lasting up to four million years, is also hypothesised to be behind these sea level variations.

== Climate ==
The Triassic continental interior climate was generally hot and dry, so that typical deposits are red bed sandstones and evaporites. There is no evidence of glaciation at or near either pole; in fact, the polar regions were apparently moist and temperate, providing a climate suitable for forests and vertebrates, including reptiles. Pangaea's large size limited the moderating effect of the global ocean; its continental climate was highly seasonal, with very hot summers and cool winters. The strong contrast between the Pangea supercontinent and the global ocean triggered intense cross-equatorial monsoons, sometimes referred to as the Pangean megamonsoons.

The Triassic may have mostly been a dry period, but evidence exists that it was punctuated by several episodes of increased rainfall in tropical and subtropical latitudes of the Tethys Sea and its surrounding land. Sediments and fossils suggestive of a more humid climate are known from the Anisian to Ladinian of the Tethysian domain, and from the Carnian and Rhaetian of a larger area that includes also the Boreal domain (e.g., Svalbard Islands), the North American continent, the South China block and Argentina. The best-studied of such episodes of humid climate, and probably the most intense and widespread, was the Carnian Pluvial Event.

=== Early Triassic ===
The Early Triassic was the hottest portion of the entire Phanerozoic, seeing as it occurred during and immediately after the discharge of titanic volumes of greenhouse gases from the Siberian Traps. The Early Triassic began with the Permian-Triassic Thermal Maximum (PTTM) and was followed by the brief Dienerian Cooling (DC) from 251 to 249 Ma, which was in turn followed by the Latest Smithian Thermal Maximum (LSTT) around 249 to 248 Ma. During the Latest Olenekian Cooling (LOC), from 248 to 247 Ma, temperatures cooled by about 6 °C.

=== Middle Triassic ===
The Middle Triassic was cooler than the Early Triassic, with temperatures falling over most of the Anisian, with the exception of a warming spike in the latter portion of the stage. From 242 to 233 Ma, the Ladinian-Carnian Cooling (LCC) ensued.

=== Late Triassic ===
At the beginning of the Carnian, global temperatures continued to be relatively cool. The eruption of the Wrangellia Large Igneous Province around 234 Ma caused abrupt global warming, terminating the cooling trend of the LCC. This warming was responsible for the Carnian Pluvial Event and resulted in an episode of widespread global humidity. The CPE ushered in the Mid-Carnian Warm Interval (MCWI), which lasted from 234 to 227 Ma. At the Carnian-Norian boundary occurred a positive δ^{13}C excursion believed to signify an increase in organic carbon burial. From 227 to 217 Ma, there was a relatively cool period known as the Early Norian Cool Interval (ENCI), after which occurred the Mid-Norian Warm Interval (MNWI) from 217 to 209 Ma. The MNWI was briefly interrupted around 214 Ma by a cooling possibly related to the Manicouagan impact. Around 212 Ma, a 10 Myr eccentricity maximum caused a paludification of Pangaea and a reduction in the size of arid climatic zones. The Rhaetian Cool Interval (RCI) lasted from 209 to 201 Ma. At the terminus of the Triassic, there was an extreme warming event referred to as the End-Triassic Thermal Event (ETTE), which was responsible for the Triassic-Jurassic mass extinction. Bubbles of carbon dioxide in basaltic rocks dating back to the end of the Triassic indicate that volcanic activity from the Central Atlantic Magmatic Province helped trigger climate change in the ETTE.

== Flora ==
=== Land plants ===
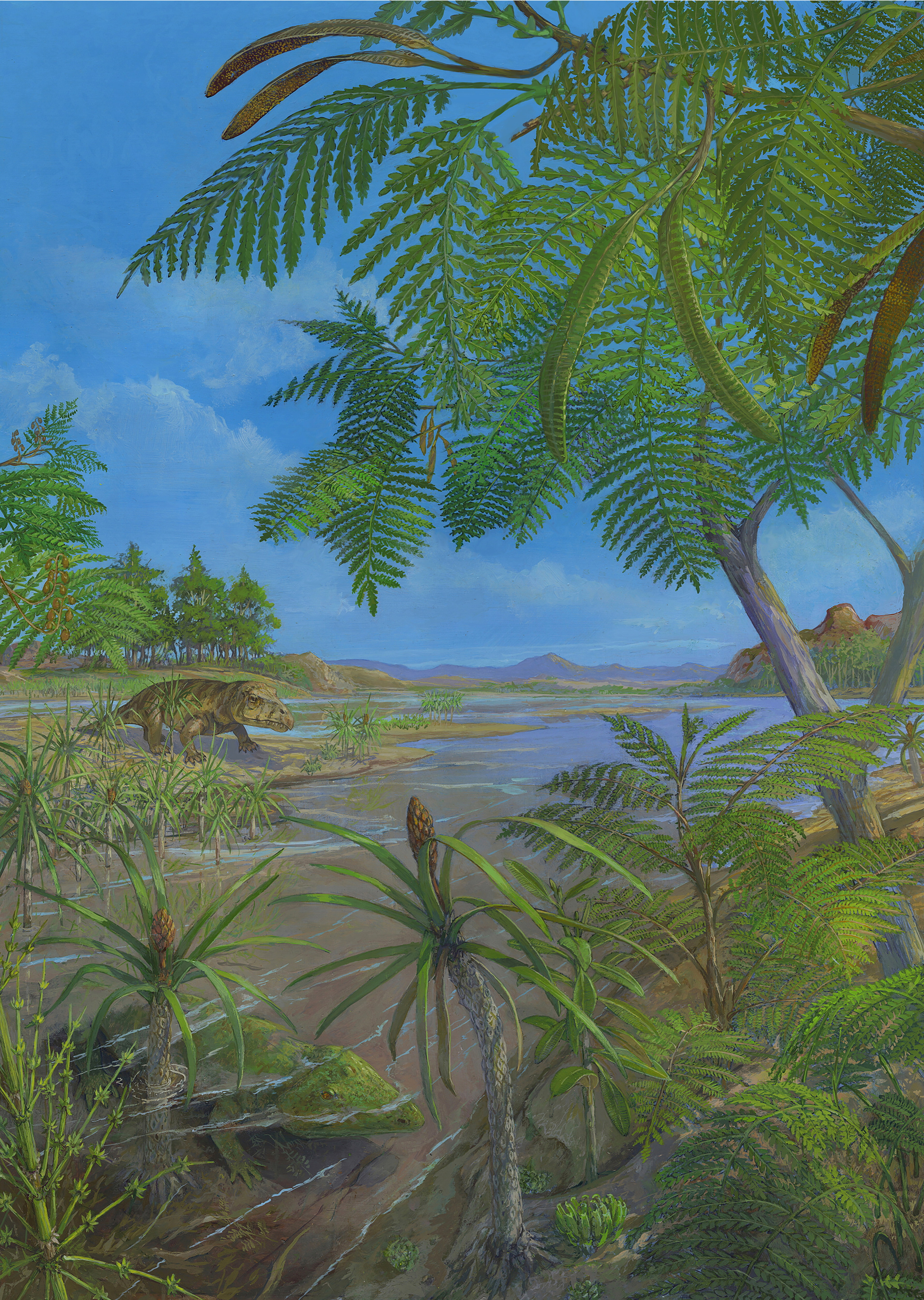
An Early Triassic Australian landscape including Pleuromeia (central foreground) as well as horsetails, Dicroidium trees (prominently on right), as well as the temnospondyl amphibian Bulgosuchus (foreground) and an erythrosuchid reptile (background left). Art by Michael Rothman

During the Early Triassic, lycophytes, particularly those of the order Isoetales (which contains living quillworts), rose to prominence due to the environmental instability following the Permian-Triassic extinction, with one particularly notable example being the genus Pleuromeia, which grew in columnar like fashion, sometimes reaching a height of 2 metres (6.6 ft). The relevance of lycophytes declined from the Middle Triassic onwards, following the return of more stable environmental conditions.

While having first appeared during the Permian, the extinct seed plant group Bennettitales first became a prominent element in global floras during the Late Triassic, a position they would hold for much of the Mesozoic. In the Southern Hemisphere landmasses of Gondwana, the tree Dicroidium, an extinct "seed fern" belong to the order Corystospermales was a dominant element in forest habitats across the region during the Middle-Late Triassic. During the Late Triassic, the Ginkgoales (which today are represented by only a single species, Ginkgo biloba) underwent considerable diversification. Conifers were abundant during the Triassic, and included the Voltziales (which contains various lineages, probably including those ancestral to modern conifers), as well as the extinct family Cheirolepidiaceae, which first appeared in the Late Triassic, and would be prominent throughout most of the rest of the Mesozoic. The Middle Triassic also included herbaceous ruderal conifers, a growth form which no longer exists in modern conifers.

==== Coal ====
Immediately above the Permian–Triassic boundary the glossopteris flora was suddenly largely displaced by an Australia-wide coniferous flora.

No known coal deposits date from the start of the Triassic Period. This is known as the Early Triassic "coal gap" and can be seen as part of the Permian–Triassic extinction event. Possible explanations for the coal gap include sharp drops in sea level at the time of the Permo-Triassic boundary; acid rain from the Siberian Traps eruptions or from an impact event that overwhelmed acidic swamps; climate shift to a greenhouse climate that was too hot and dry for peat accumulation; evolution of fungi or herbivores that were more destructive of wetlands; the extinction of all plants adapted to peat swamps, with a hiatus of several million years before new plant species evolved that were adapted to peat swamps; or soil anoxia as oxygen levels plummeted.

=== Phytoplankton ===
Before the Permian extinction, Archaeplastida (red and green algae) had been the major marine phytoplanktons since about 659–645 million years ago, when they replaced marine planktonic cyanobacteria, which first appeared about 800 million years ago, as the dominant phytoplankton in the oceans. In the Triassic, secondary endosymbiotic algae became the most important plankton.

== Fauna ==
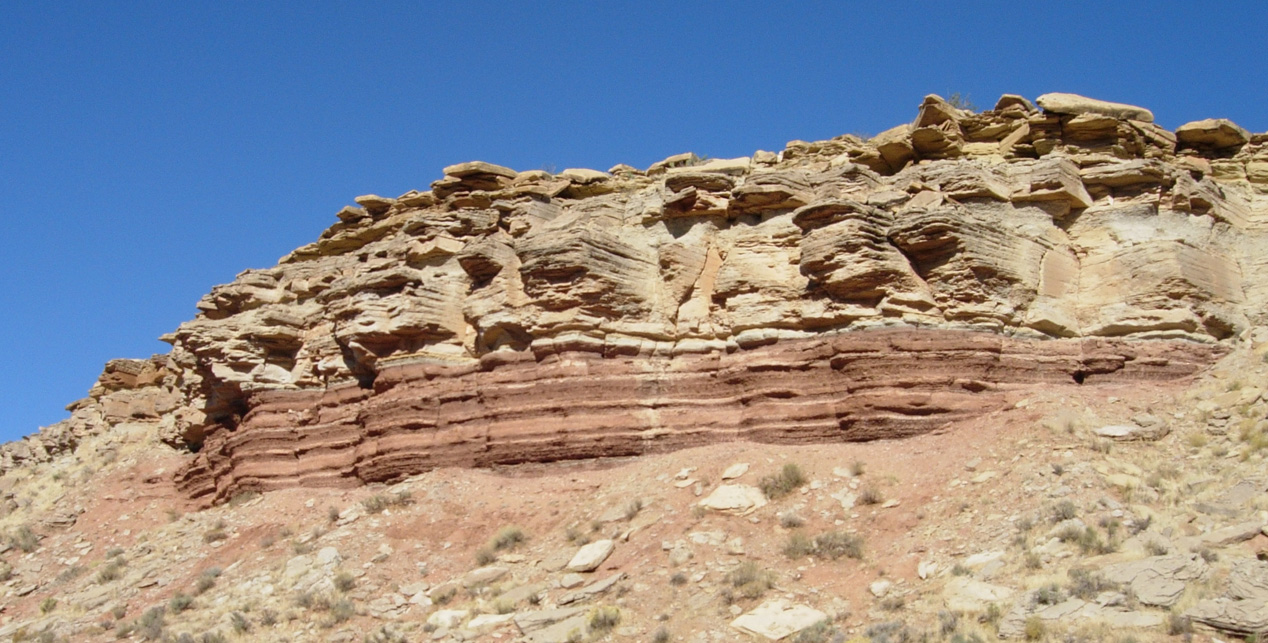
Middle Triassic marginal marine sequence, southwestern Utah

=== Marine invertebrates ===
In marine environments, new modern types of corals appeared in the Early Triassic, forming small patches of reefs of modest extent compared to the great reef systems of Devonian or modern times. At the end of the Carnian, a reef crisis occurred in South China. Serpulids appeared in the Middle Triassic. Microconchids were abundant. The shelled cephalopods called ammonites recovered, diversifying from a single line that survived the Permian extinction. Bivalves began to rapidly diversify during the Middle Triassic, becoming highly abundant in the oceans.

=== Insects ===
Aquatic insects rapidly diversified during the Middle Triassic, with this time interval representing a crucial diversification for Holometabola, the clade containing the majority of modern insect species.

=== Fish ===
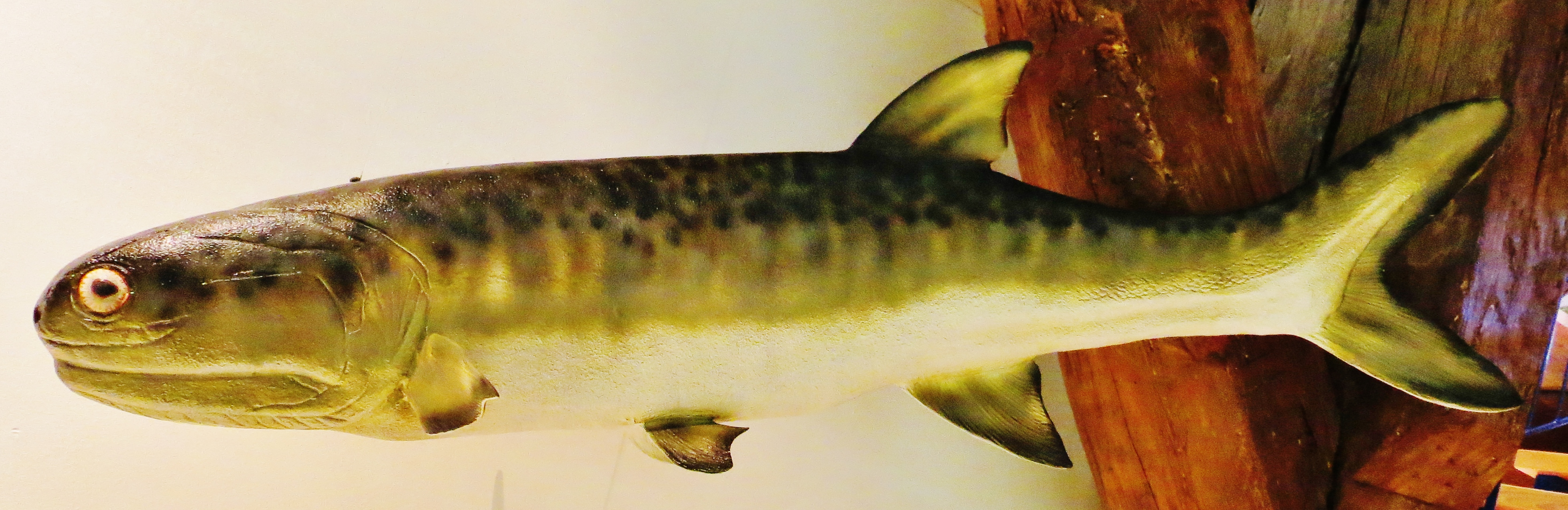
Birgeria

In the wake of the Permian-Triassic mass extinction event, the fish fauna was remarkably uniform, with many families and genera exhibiting a cosmopolitan distribution. Coelacanths show their highest post-Devonian diversity in the Early Triassic. Ray-finned fishes (actinopterygians) went through a remarkable diversification in the beginning of the Triassic, leading to peak diversity during the Middle Triassic; however, the pattern of this diversification is still not well understood due to a taphonomic megabias. The first stem-group teleosts appeared during the Triassic (teleosts are by far the most diverse group of fish today). Predatory actinopterygians such as saurichthyids and birgeriids, some of which grew over 1.2 m (3.9 ft) in length, appeared in the Early Triassic and became widespread and successful during the period as a whole. Lakes and rivers were populated by lungfish (Dipnoi), such as Ceratodus, which are mainly known from the dental plates, abundant in the fossils record. Hybodonts, a group of shark-like cartilaginous fish, were dominant in both freshwater and marine environments throughout the Triassic. Last survivors of the mainly Palaeozoic Eugeneodontida are known from the Early Triassic.

=== Amphibians ===
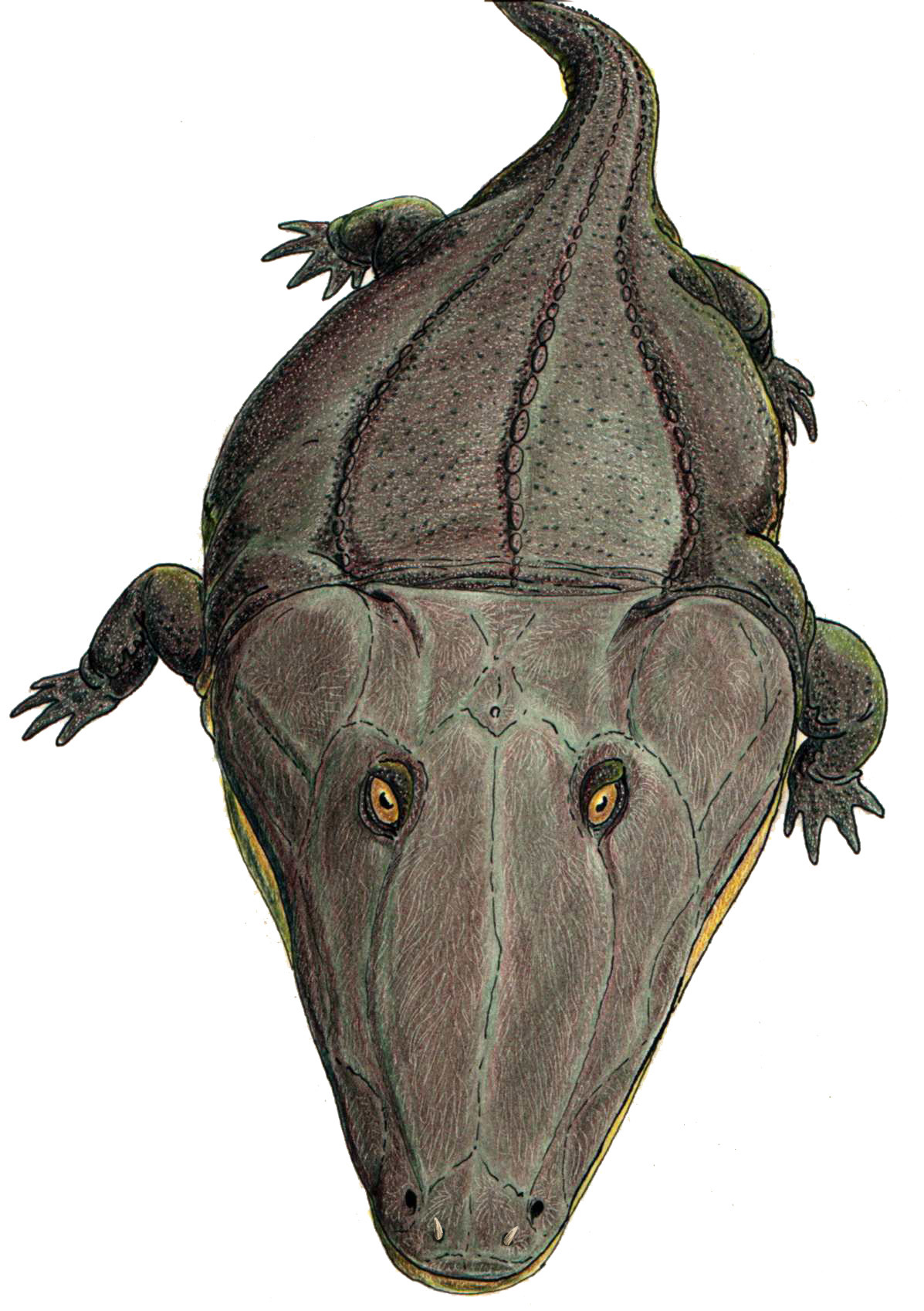
Reconstruction of the Triassic amphibian Mastodonsaurus

Temnospondyl amphibians were among those groups that survived the Permian–Triassic extinction. Once abundant in both terrestrial and aquatic environments, the terrestrial species had mostly died out during the extinction event. The Triassic survivors were aquatic or semi-aquatic, and were represented by Tupilakosaurus, Thabanchuia, Branchiosauridae and Micropholis, all of which died out in Early Triassic, and the successful Stereospondyli, with survivors into the Cretaceous Period. The largest Triassic stereospondyls, such as Mastodonsaurus, were up to 4 to 6 metres (13 to 20 ft) in length. Some lineages (e.g. trematosaurs) flourished briefly in the Early Triassic, while others (e.g. capitosaurs) remained successful throughout the whole period, or only came to prominence in the Late Triassic (e.g. Plagiosaurus, metoposaurs).

The first Lissamphibians (modern amphibians) appear in the Triassic, with the progenitors of the first frogs already present by the Early Triassic. However, the group as a whole did not become common until the Jurassic, when the temnospondyls had become very rare.

Most of the Reptiliomorpha, stem-amniotes that gave rise to the amniotes, disappeared in the Triassic, but two water-dwelling groups survived: Embolomeri that only survived into the early part of the period, and the Chroniosuchia, which survived until the end of the Triassic.

The Ashfield Shale of western Sydney, formed during the Middle Triassic, features amphibian fossils from that period.

=== Reptiles ===
==== Archosauromorphs ====
The Permian–Triassic extinction devastated terrestrial life. Biodiversity rebounded as the surviving species repopulated empty terrain, but these were short-lived. Diverse communities with complex food-web structures took 30 million years to reestablish. Archosauromorph reptiles, which had already appeared and diversified to an extent in the Permian Period, exploded in diversity as an adaptive radiation in response to the Permian-Triassic mass extinction. By the Early Triassic, several major archosauromorph groups had appeared. Long-necked, lizard-like early archosauromorphs were known as protorosaurs, which is likely a paraphyletic group rather than a true clade. Tanystropheids were a family of protorosaurs which elevated their neck size to extremes, with the largest genus Tanystropheus having a neck longer than its body. The protorosaur family Sharovipterygidae used their elongated hindlimbs for gliding. Other archosauromorphs, such as rhynchosaurs and allokotosaurs, were mostly stocky-bodied herbivores with specialized jaw structures.

Allokotosaurs were iguana-like reptiles, including Trilophosaurus (a common Late Triassic reptile with three-crowned teeth), Teraterpeton (which had a long beak-like snout), and Shringasaurus (a horned herbivore which reached a body length of 3–4 metres (9.8–13.1 ft)).

One group of archosauromorphs, the archosauriforms, were distinguished by their active predatory lifestyle, with serrated teeth and upright limb postures. Archosauriforms were diverse in the Triassic, including various terrestrial and semiaquatic predators of all shapes and sizes. The large-headed and robust erythrosuchids were among the dominant carnivores in the early Triassic.

True archosaurs appeared in the early Triassic, splitting into two branches: Avemetatarsalia (the ancestors to birds) and Pseudosuchia (the ancestors to crocodilians). Avemetatarsalians were a minor component of their ecosystems, but eventually produced the earliest pterosaurs and dinosaurs in the Late Triassic. Early long-tailed pterosaurs appeared in the Norian and quickly spread worldwide. Triassic dinosaurs evolved in the Carnian and include early sauropodomorphs and theropods. Most Triassic dinosaurs were small predators and only a few were common, such as Coelophysis, which was 1 to 2 metres (3.3 to 6.6 ft) long. Triassic sauropodomorphs primarily inhabited cooler regions of the world.

The large predator Smok was most likely also an archosaur, but it is uncertain if it was a primitive dinosaur or a pseudosuchian.

Pseudosuchians were far more ecologically dominant in the Triassic, including large herbivores (such as aetosaurs), large carnivores ("rauisuchians"), and the first crocodylomorphs ("sphenosuchians"). "Rauisuchians" were ancestral to small, lightly-built crocodylomorphs, the only pseudosuchians which survived into the Jurassic.

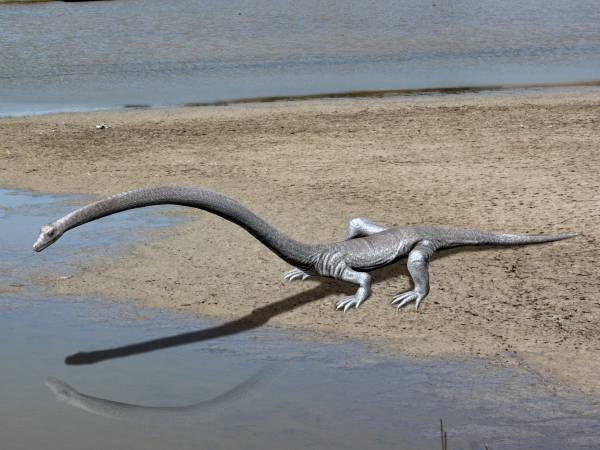
Tanystropheus, a long-necked tanystropheid

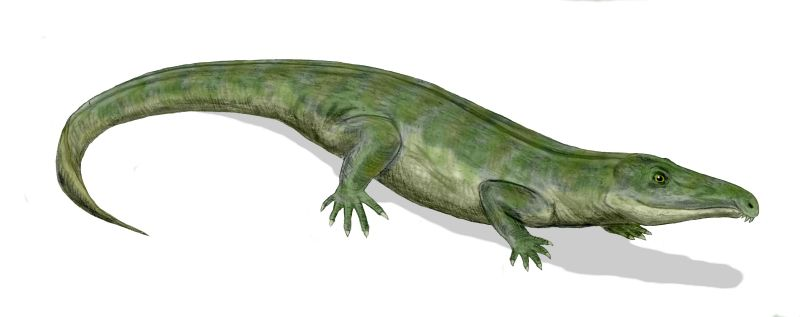
Proterosuchus, a crocodile-like early archosauriform from the Early Triassic

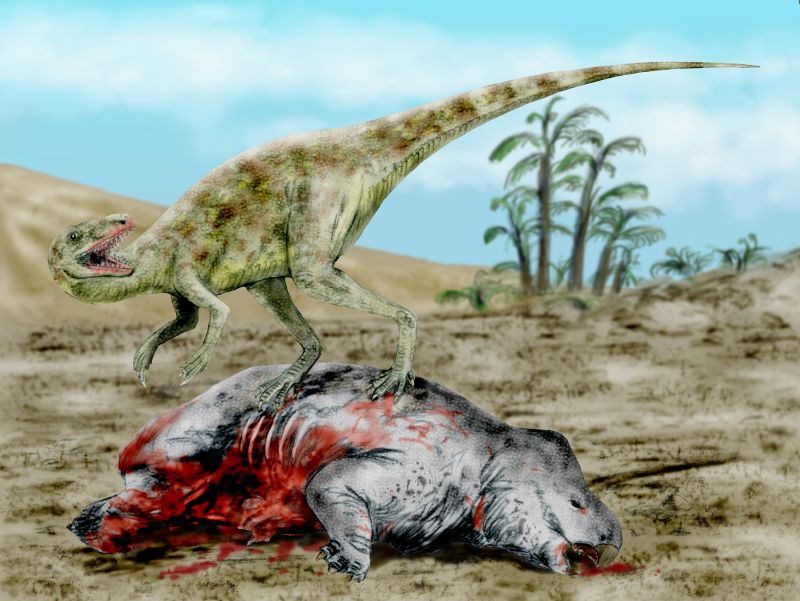
Staurikosaurus, one of the earliest dinosaurs, a member of the Triassic family Herrerasauridae

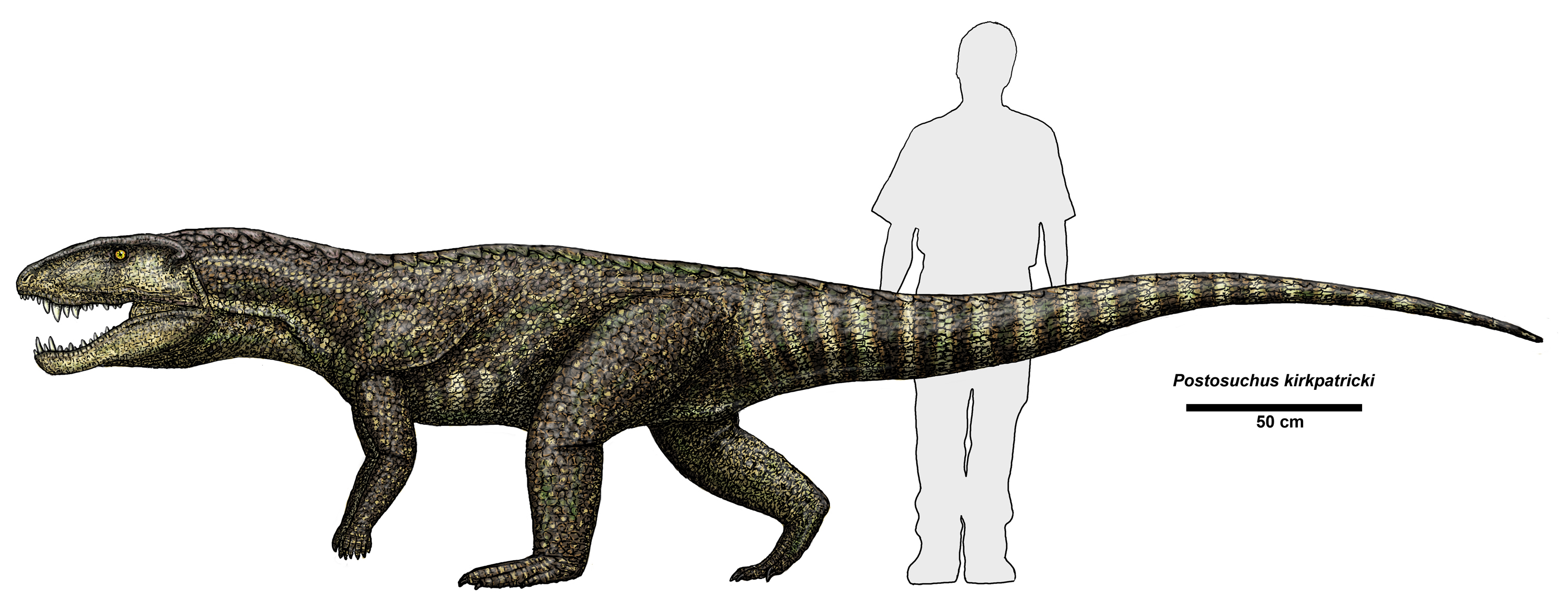
Postosuchus, a rauisuchid which was an apex predator in parts of Late Triassic North America

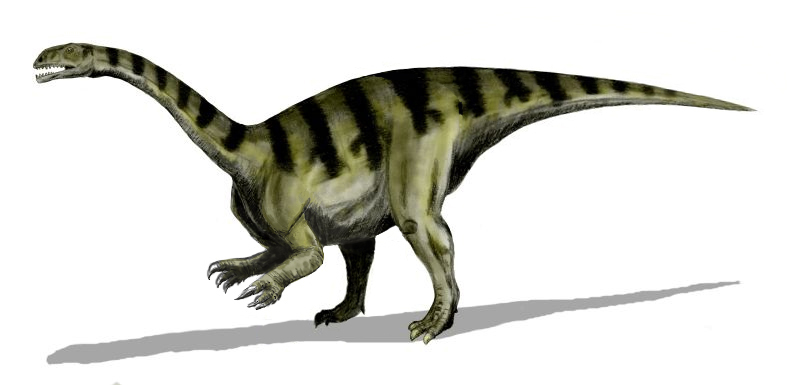
Plateosaurus was one of the largest of early sauropodomorphs, or "prosauropods", of the Late Triassic

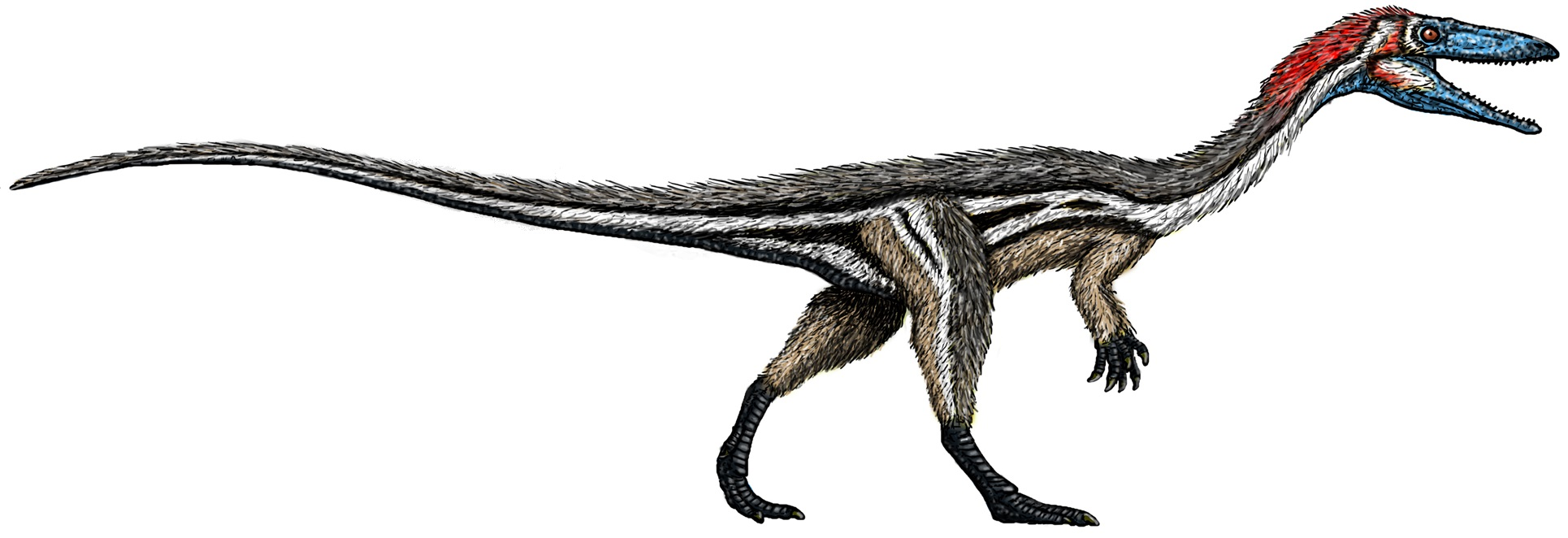
Coelophysis was one of the most abundant theropod dinosaurs in the Late Triassic

==== Marine reptiles ====
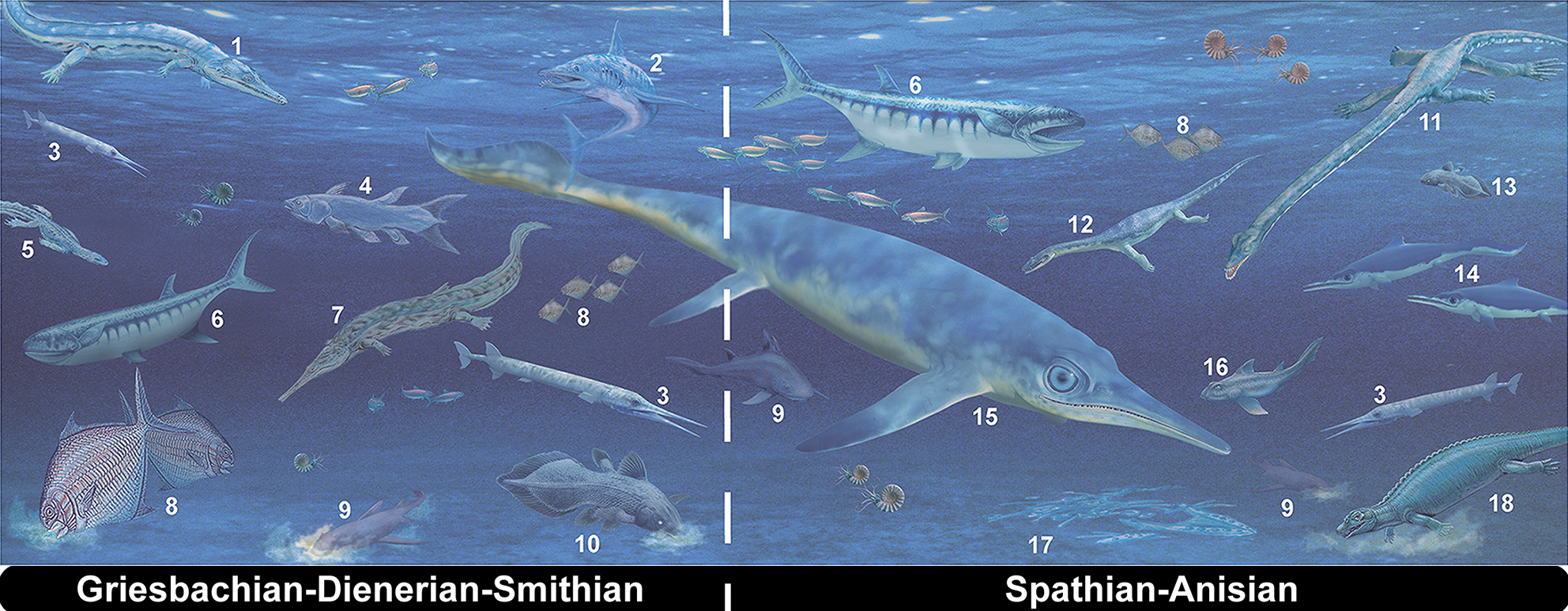
Marine vertebrate apex predators of the Early Triassic and Anisian (Middle Triassic)

There were many types of marine reptiles. These included the Sauropterygia, which featured pachypleurosaurs and nothosaurs (both common during the Middle Triassic, especially in the Tethys region), placodonts, the earliest known herbivorous marine reptile Atopodentatus, and the first plesiosaurs. The first of the lizard-like Thalattosauria (Askeptosaurus) and the highly successful ichthyopterygians, which appeared in Early Triassic seas, soon diversified. By the Middle Triassic, some ichthyopterygians were achieving very large body masses.

==== Other reptiles ====
Among other reptiles, the earliest turtles, like Proganochelys and Proterochersis, appeared during the Norian Age (Stage) of the Late Triassic Period. The Lepidosauromorpha, specifically the Sphenodontia, are first found in the fossil record of the earlier Carnian Age, though the earliest lepidosauromorphs likely occurred in the Permian. The Procolophonidae, the last surviving parareptiles, were an important group of small lizard-like herbivores. The drepanosaurs were a clade of unusual, chameleon-like arboreal reptiles with birdlike heads and specialised claws.

=== Synapsids ===
Three therapsid groups survived into the Triassic: dicynodonts, therocephalians, and cynodonts. The cynodont Cynognathus was a characteristic top predator in the Olenekian and Anisian of Gondwana. Both kannemeyeriiform dicynodonts and gomphodont cynodonts remained important herbivores during much of the period. Therocephalians included both large predators (Moschorhinus) and herbivorous forms (bauriids) until their extinction midway through the period. Ecteniniid cynodonts played a role as large-sized, cursorial predators in the Late Triassic. During the Carnian (early part of the Late Triassic), some advanced cynodonts gave rise to the first mammals.

During the Triassic, archosaurs displaced therapsids as the largest and most ecologically prolific terrestrial amniotes. This "Triassic Takeover" may have contributed to the evolution of mammals by forcing the surviving therapsids and their mammaliaform successors to live as small, mainly nocturnal insectivores. Nocturnal life may have forced the mammaliaforms to develop fur and a higher metabolic rate.

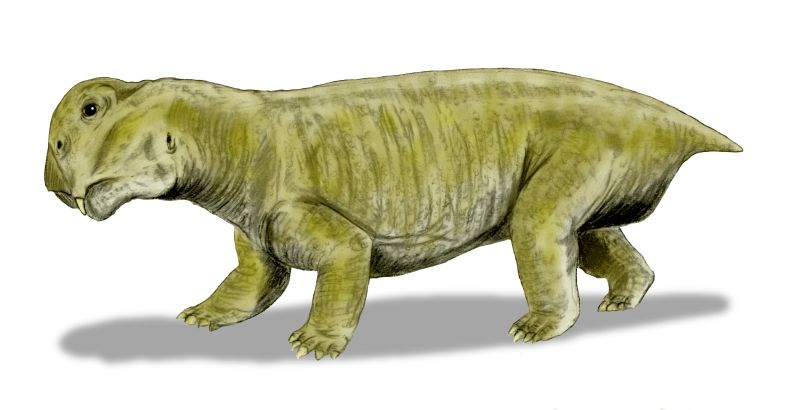
Lystrosaurus was a widespread dicynodont and the most common land vertebrate during the Early Triassic, after animal life had been greatly diminished

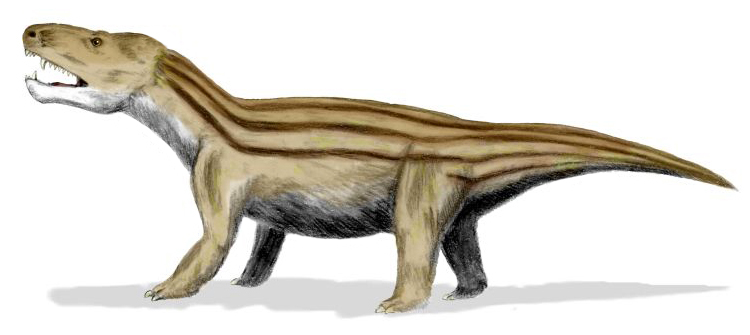
Cynognathus was a carnivorous mammal-like cynodont from the Early Triassic.

== Lagerstätten ==
Two Early Triassic lagerstätten (high-quality fossil beds), the Dienerian aged Guiyang biota and the earliest Spathian aged Paris biota stand out due to their exceptional preservation and diversity. They represent the earliest lagerstätten of the Mesozoic era and provide insight into the biotic recovery from the Permian-Triassic mass extinction event.

The Monte San Giorgio lagerstätte, now in the Lake Lugano region of northern Italy and southern Switzerland, was in Middle Triassic times a lagoon behind reefs with an anoxic bottom layer, so there were no scavengers and little turbulence to disturb fossilization, a situation that can be compared to the better-known Jurassic Solnhofen Limestone lagerstätte. The remains of fish and various marine reptiles (including the common pachypleurosaur Neusticosaurus, and the bizarre long-necked archosauromorph Tanystropheus), along with some terrestrial forms like Ticinosuchus and Macrocnemus, have been recovered from this locality. All these fossils date from the Anisian and Ladinian ages (about 242 Ma ago).

== Triassic–Jurassic extinction event ==
The mass extinction event is marked by 'End Tr'

The Triassic Period ended with a mass extinction, which was particularly severe in the oceans; the conodonts disappeared, as did all the marine reptiles except ichthyosaurs and plesiosaurs. Invertebrates like brachiopods and molluscs (such as gastropods) were severely affected. In the oceans, 22% of marine families and possibly about half of marine genera went missing.

Though the end-Triassic extinction event was not equally devastating in all terrestrial ecosystems, several important clades of crurotarsans (large archosaurian reptiles previously grouped together as the thecodonts) disappeared, as did most of the large labyrinthodont amphibians, groups of small reptiles, and most synapsids. Some of the early, primitive dinosaurs also became extinct, but more adaptive ones survived to evolve into the Jurassic. Surviving plants that went on to dominate the Mesozoic world included modern conifers and cycadeoids.

The cause of the Late Triassic extinction is uncertain. It was accompanied by huge volcanic eruptions that occurred as the supercontinent Pangaea began to break apart about 202 to 191 million years ago (40Ar/39Ar dates), forming the Central Atlantic Magmatic Province (CAMP), one of the largest known inland volcanic events since the planet had first cooled and stabilized. Other possible but less likely causes for the extinction events include global cooling or even a bolide impact, for which an impact crater containing Manicouagan Reservoir in Quebec, Canada, has been singled out. However, the Manicouagan impact melt has been dated to 214±1 Ma. The date of the Triassic-Jurassic boundary has also been more accurately fixed recently, at 201.4 Ma. Both dates are gaining accuracy by using more accurate forms of radiometric dating, in particular the decay of uranium to lead in zircons formed at time of the impact. So, the evidence suggests the Manicouagan impact preceded the end of the Triassic by approximately 10±2 Ma. It could not therefore be the immediate cause of the observed mass extinction.

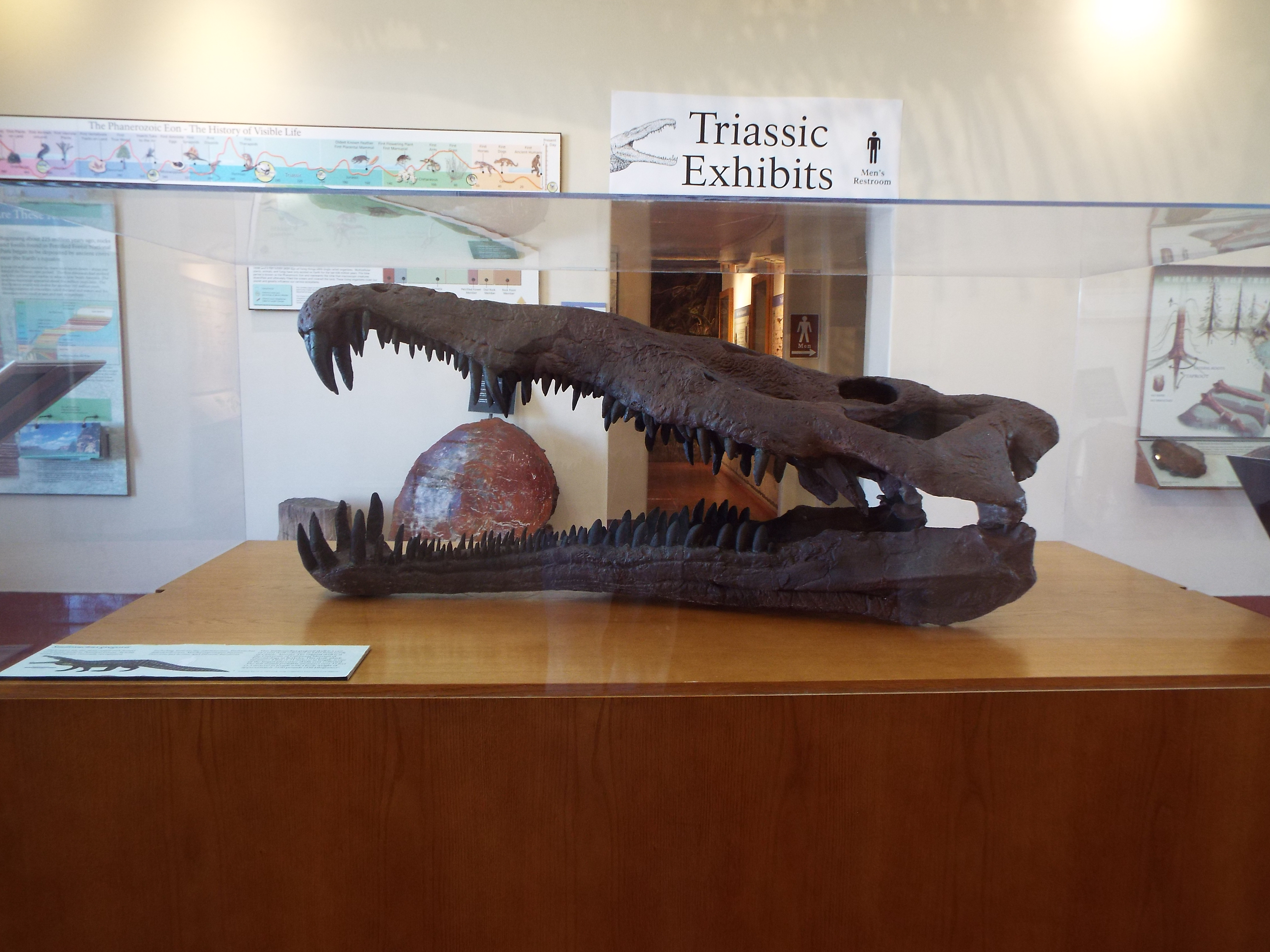
Skull of a Triassic Period phytosaur found in the Petrified Forest National Park

The number of Late Triassic extinctions is disputed. Some studies suggest that there are at least two periods of extinction towards the end of the Triassic, separated by 12 to 17 million years. But arguing against this is a recent study of North American faunas. In the Petrified Forest of northeast Arizona there is a unique sequence of late Carnian-early Norian terrestrial sediments. An analysis in 2002 found no significant change in the paleoenvironment. Phytosaurs, the most common fossils there, experienced a change-over only at the genus level, and the number of species remained the same. Some aetosaurs, the next most common tetrapods, and early dinosaurs, passed through unchanged. However, both phytosaurs and aetosaurs were among the groups of archosaur reptiles completely wiped out by the end-Triassic extinction event.

It seems likely then that there was some sort of end-Carnian extinction, when several herbivorous archosauromorph groups died out, while the large herbivorous therapsids—the kannemeyeriid dicynodonts and the traversodont cynodonts—were much reduced in the northern half of Pangaea (Laurasia).

These extinctions within the Triassic and at its end allowed the dinosaurs to expand into many niches that had become unoccupied. Dinosaurs became increasingly dominant, abundant and diverse, and remained that way for the next 150 million years. The true "Age of Dinosaurs" is during the following Jurassic and Cretaceous periods, rather than the Triassic.

== See also ==
- Geologic time scale – System that relates geologic strata to time
- List of fossil sites (with link directory)
- Triassic land vertebrate faunachrons – Subdivisions of geological time
- Phylloceratina – Extinct suborder of molluscs
- Dinosaur – Diverse clade of specialized reptiles
