= Triassic Boreal Ocean Delta Plain =

Largest known delta plain in Earth's geological history

Triassic Boral Ocean Delta Plain
- Delta Plain
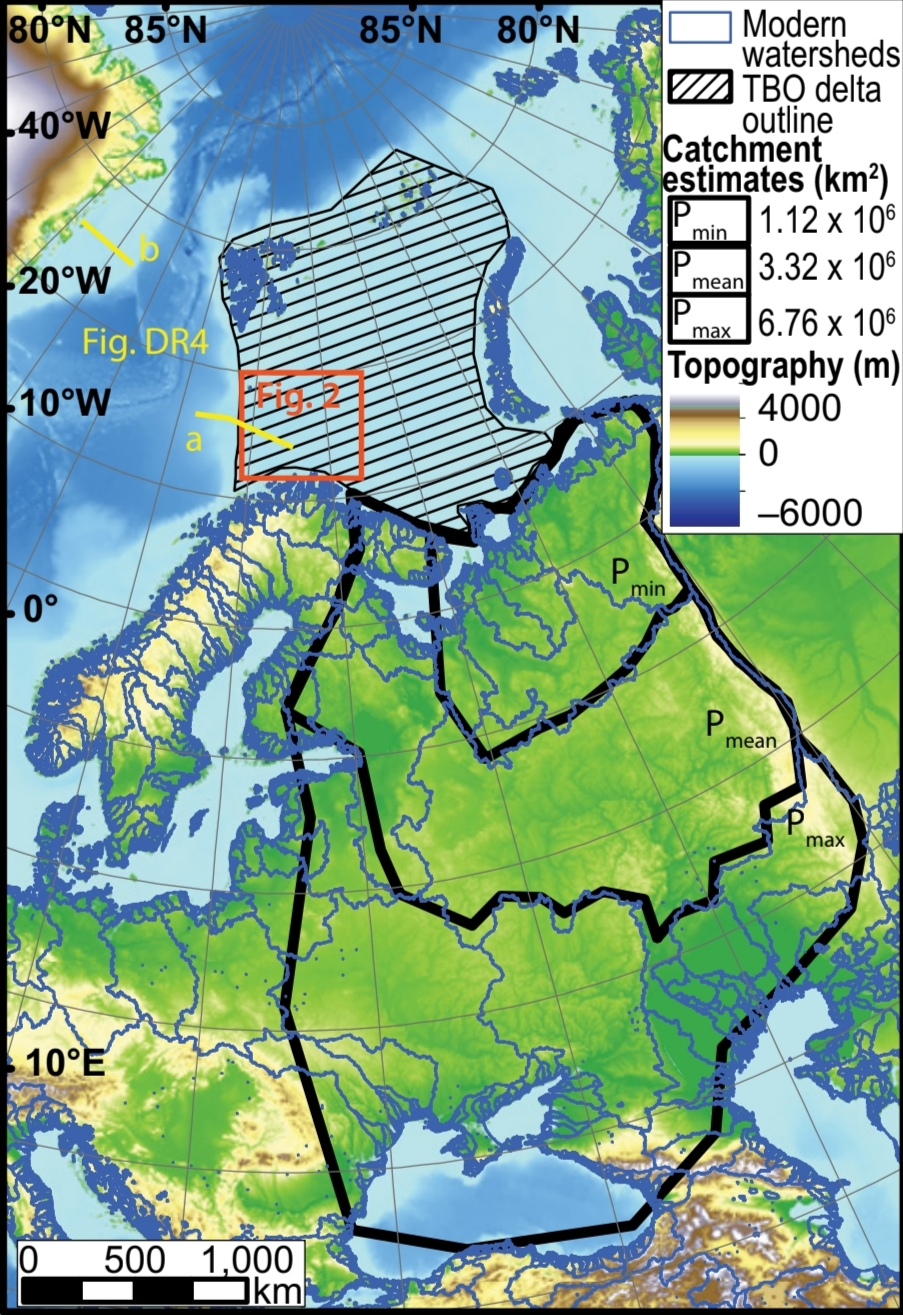
- Geographical extent of the Triassic Boreal Ocean Delta Plain
- Location: Present Day — Greater Barents Sea Basin; During Carnian age of the Triassic — Northern Pangaea
- Age: 237–227 Ma

Area
  - Total: >1,650,000 square kilometers (640,000 sq mi)

The Triassic Boreal Ocean (TBO) Delta Plain was a fluvial delta plain formation located in Northern Pangaea during the Triassic period (Carnian) from 237 to 227 million years ago (mya). Covering a surface area of more than 1.65 million km^{2} (640,000 sq mi) across, it is currently the largest known delta plain to have existed in Earth's geological history.

== Evidence of existence ==
=== Stratigraphical evidence ===
- Large siltstone based strata from the Induan age across 1,000 kilometres (620 miles) of the Greater Barents Sea Basin.

=== Sedimentological evidence ===
- Seaward sediment advancement of over 500 kilometres (310 miles) across the Greater Barents Sea Basin being of deltaic depositional origin dating to the Ladinian age overlapping with the basin's shelf edge.

=== Seismic evidence ===
- Seismic reflections from the Greater Barents Sea Basin indicating continuous sedimentation in phases during the Triassic along with 3D seismic data featuring large scale channel belts characteristic of delta plains.

== Formation ==
The region of formation of the Triassic Boreal Ocean (TBO) Delta Plain has had little tectonic activity since the Carboniferous and likely acted as a transitioning zone between a basin and the nearby catchments onwards from that period.

The formation of what would become the TBO Delta plain began soon after the Permian-Triassic Event when the Triassic Boreal Ocean experienced rapid sediment deposition, resulting in the formation of a shallow basin by the Early Triassic. However, the sediment deposition rate reduced during the Olenekian-Anisian ages and only recovered by the Ladinian age of the Middle Triassic epoch, with the delta plain having formed by 237 mya during the early Carnian.

Formation of the TBO Delta Plain

The TBO delta plain developed in phases, with each phase lasting for 2 to 5 Ma, allowed by the mostly minor to medium sea level fluctuations during the Triassic.

== Paleogeography ==
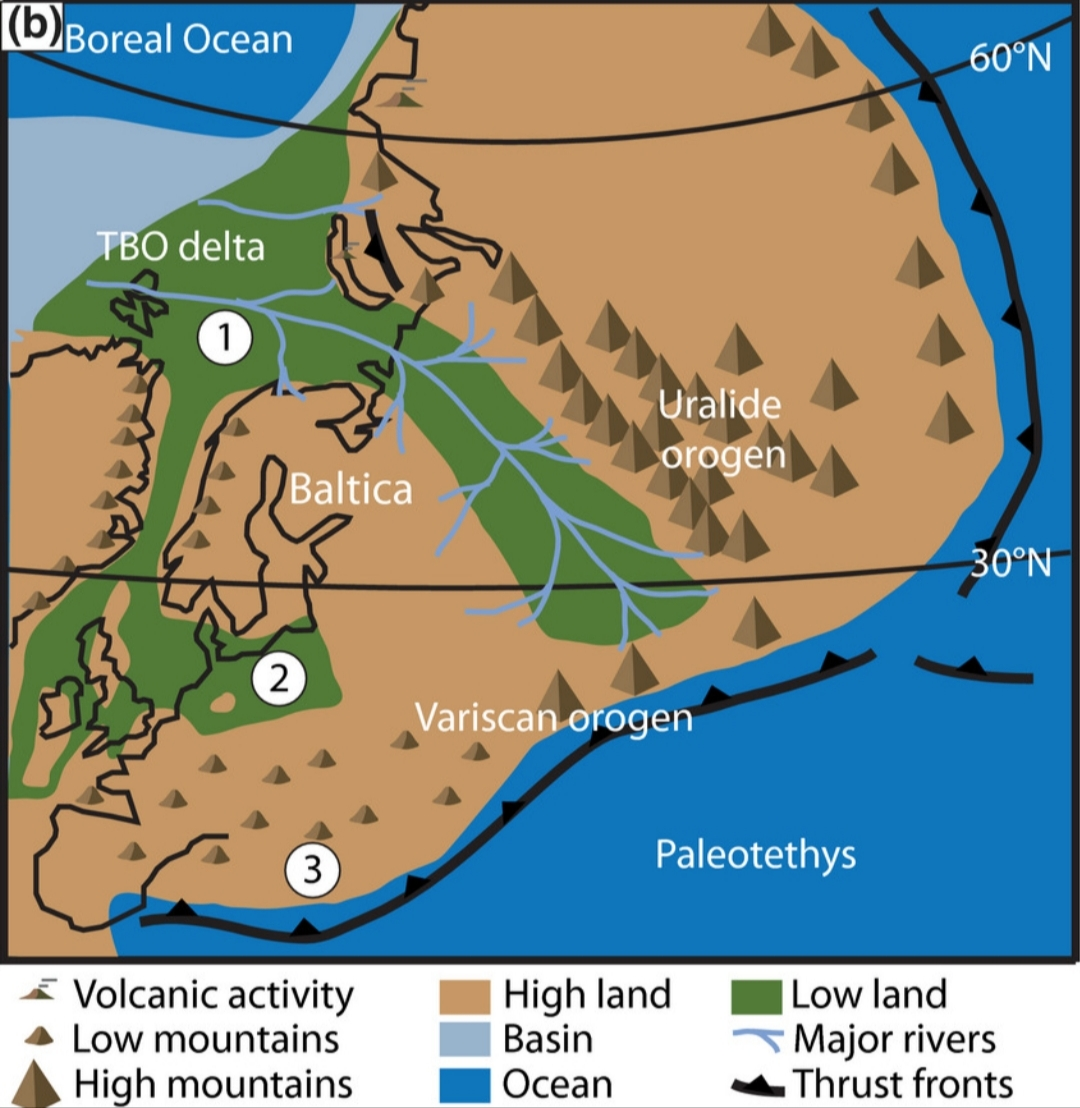
Reconstruction of the TBO Delta Plain region

The Triassic Boreal Ocean Delta Plain had an estimated surface area of more than 1.65 million km^{2} (640,000 sq mi), extending from the Uralides in the southeast to Svalbard and Sverdrup basin in the northwest. Geological evidence show the presence of winding river systems in the upstream parts of the delta plain during the early Carnian with the formation of similar but narrower river systems by the late Carnian as the delta plain expanded further across the shallow TBO basin. The drainage volume of the TBO delta plain was vast, fed by a major river system from the southeast along with smaller rivers. The Urals were then of a much higher elevation than present — 4 kilometres (2.5 miles) to 6 kilometres (3.7 miles), and acted as a key upland source in the TBO drainage basin. The river systems were also fed by heavy rainfall due to the monsoon climate.

=== Comparison with modern counterparts ===
As stated earlier, the duration of the various sedimental deposition phases during the formation of the TBO Delta Plain lasted for 2 to 5 Ma individually which is substantially more than modern deltas where similar processes have lasted for only about 10 Ka.

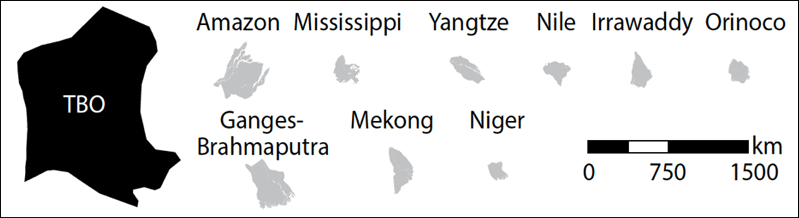
Surface area comparison of the Triassic Boreal Ocean Delta Plain to current deltas

In terms of surface area, the TBO Delta Plain being 1,650,000 square kilometres (640,000 mi^{2}) across was more than ten times the size of today's largest delta plain, the Amazon Delta Plain which is only 108,000 square kilometres (42,000 mi^{2}) in surface area, with the former being larger than even certain seas such as the Yellow sea which has an area of 856,000 square kilometres (331,000 mi^{2}).

Comparison of conservative area estimate of TBO Delta Plain with that of Amazon Delta Plain.
Name	Area (in km²)
TBO Delta Plain	1,650,000
Amazon Delta Plain	108,000

== Biota ==
=== Fauna ===
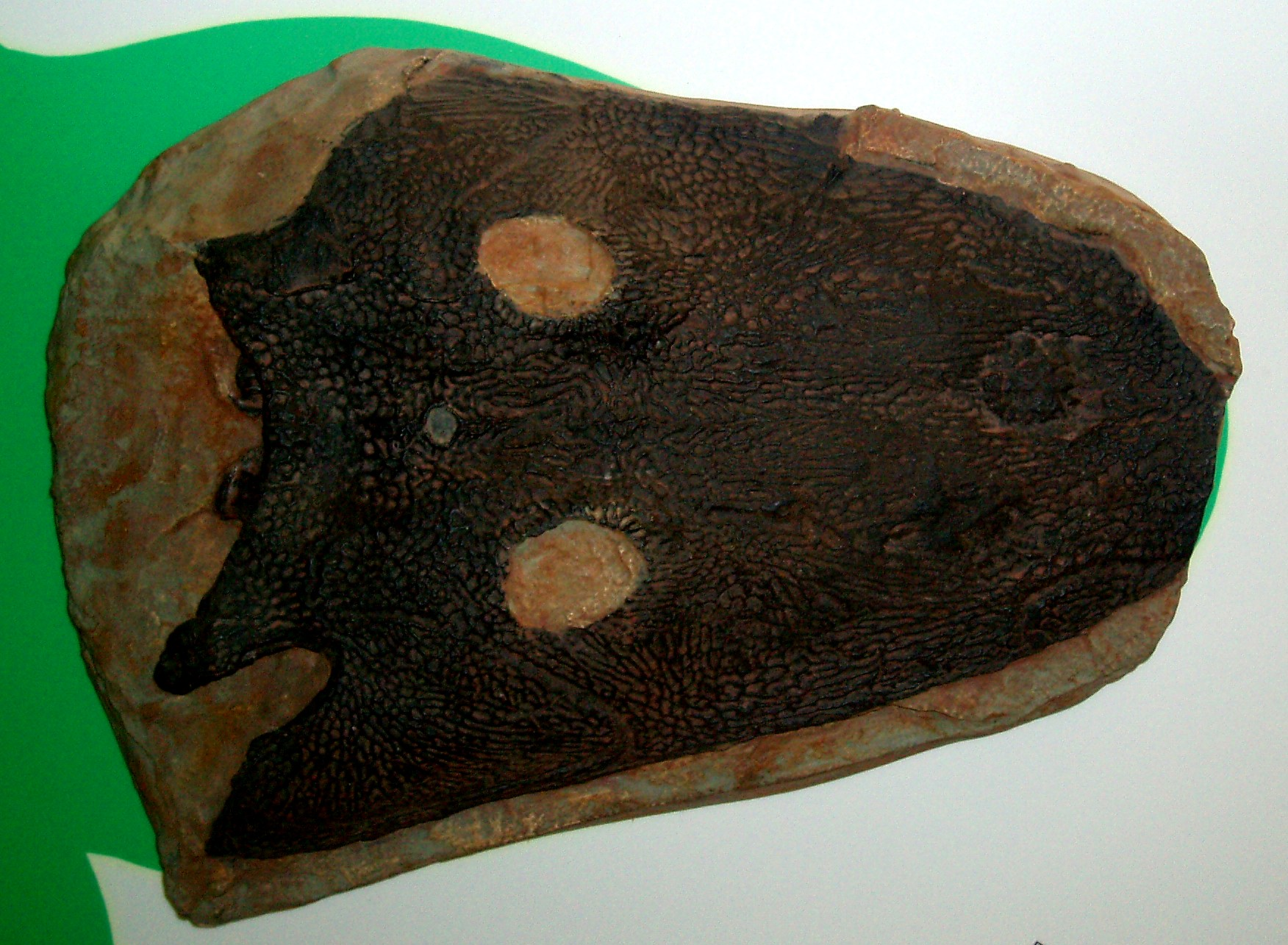
Capitosaurus polaris was one of the inhabitants of the TBO Delta Plain

Fossil record for vertebrate inhabitants of the delta plain is sparse due to its vicinity to harsh coastal conditions but recovered specimens suggest that the region was inhabited by various temnospondyl amphibians of the suborder Stereospondyli and the capitosaurian species Capitosaurus polaris. Semi aquatic Crurotarsians also inhabited this region, though they suffered extreme environmental stresses due to repeated floodings, destroying their habitat later into the Carnian. Invertebrate presence can be deciphered from trace fossils of invertebrate leaf eaters and possibly mites.

=== Flora ===
Subfossils indicate that the delta's floral ecosystem had low diversity, primarily dominated by bennettitaleans and lycophytes along with a limited presence of gymnosperms and pteridophytes. The bennettitaleans possibly had interactions with fungi and bacteria. Various fungi and fungal analogs also inhabited the delta plain. Dinoflagellate cysts of the species Rhaetogonyaulax arctica have been recovered along with palynomorphs from the species — Semiretisporis hochulii, Podosporites vigraniae, Leschikisporis aduncus, and Protodiploxypinus.

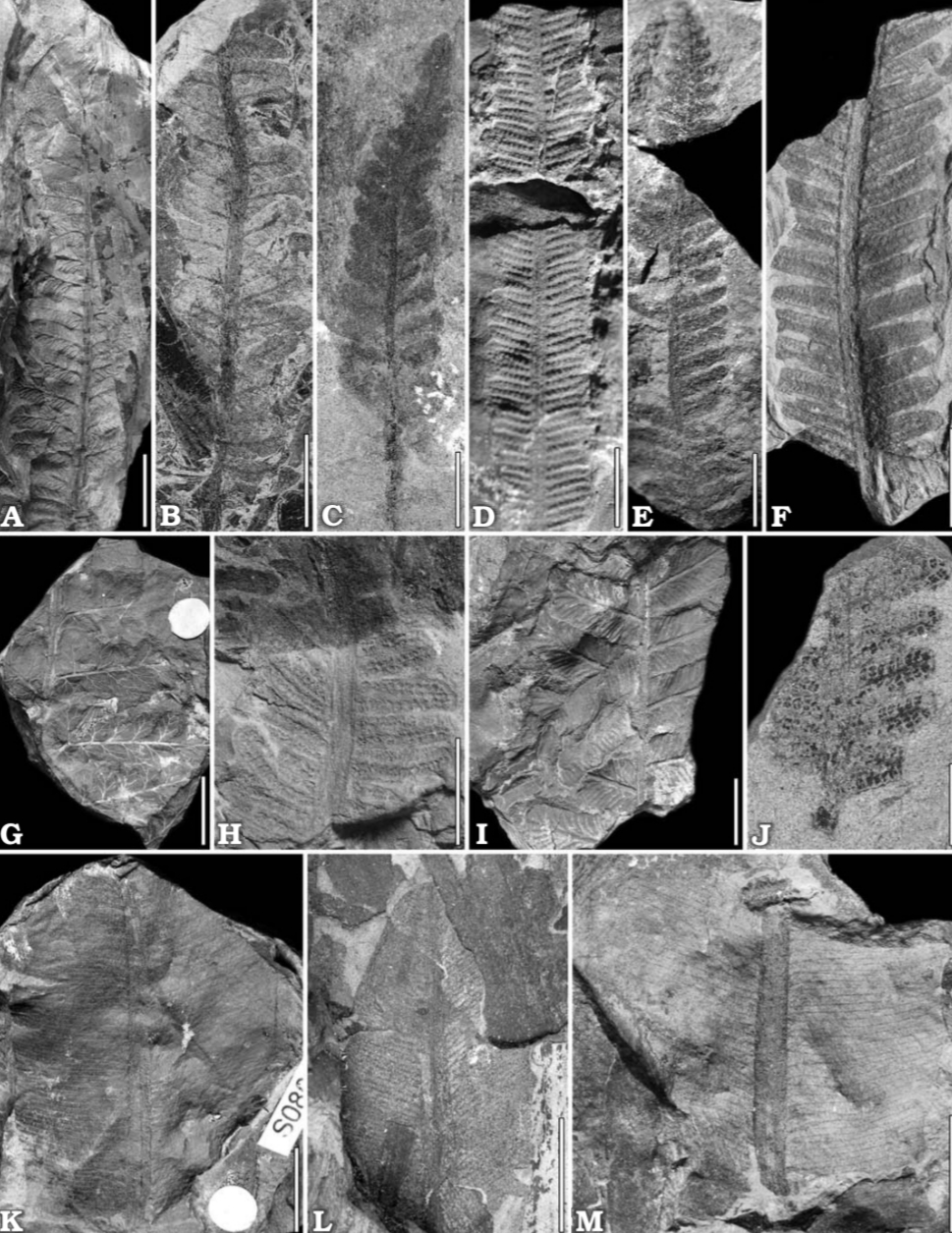
Floral fossils of the TBO Delta Plain

Fossilised evidence has also been found about the presence of the fern species — Kyrtomisporis gracilis, K. laevigatus and K. speciosus along with the lycophyte species — Cingulizonates rhaeticus, Limbosporites lundbladiae and Retitriletes austroclavatidites. The fern Kyrtomisporis gracilis was endemic to the TBO Delta Plain. The appearance of these species in this region predates their appearance elsewhere by 20 Ma which suggests that they evolved in this region before extending their range towards inner Pangaea in the south. The fern Asterotheca meriani had resemblance to trees and dominated the delta plain before the emergence of the aforementioned species.

== Paleoecological significance ==
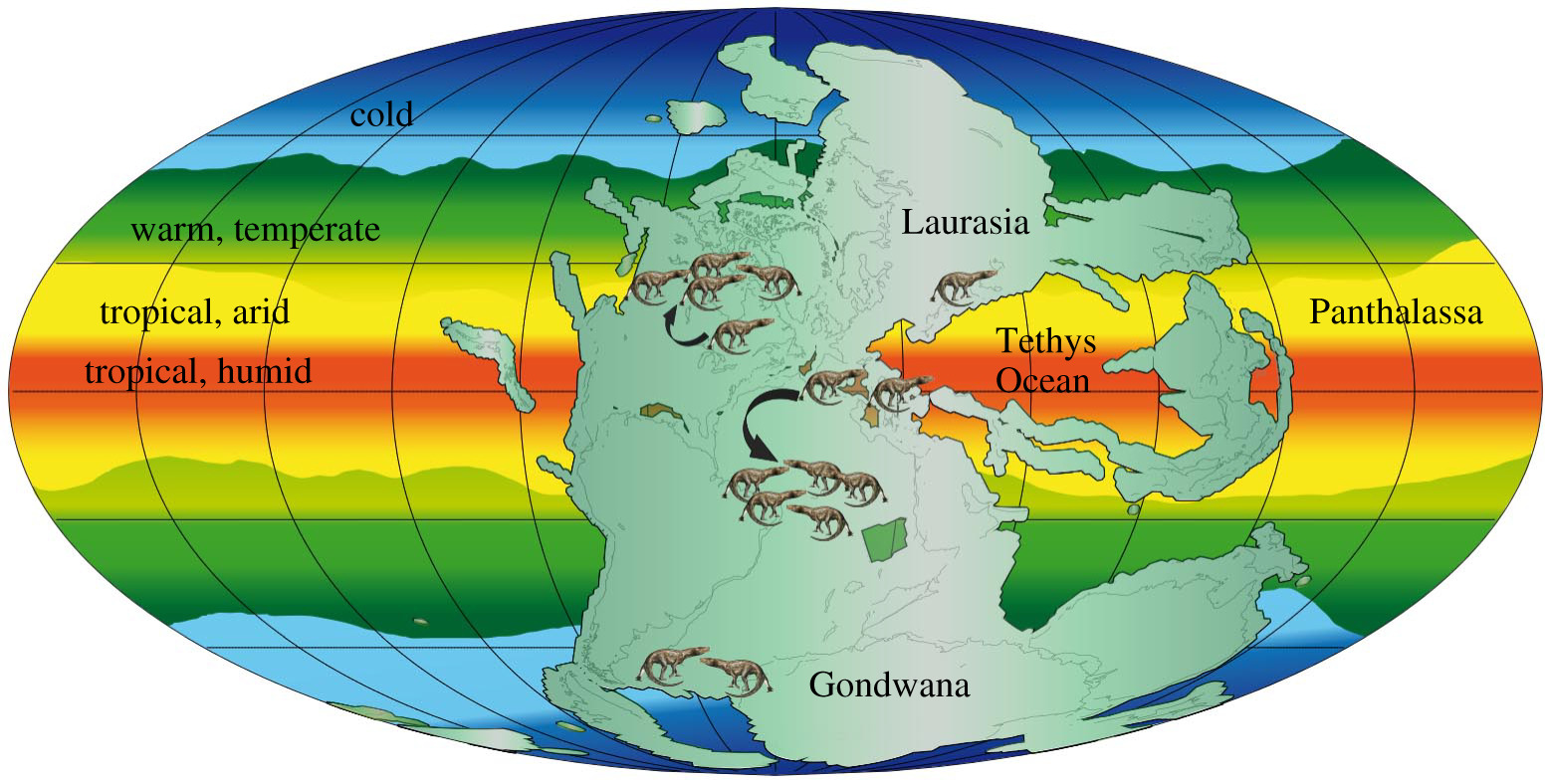
Post–Permian-Triassic Extinction Event population shift of organisms away from near equatorial regions. TBO Delta Plain was located in northern Pangaea and acted as a refugium.

Following the Permian-Triassic Extinction Event, the TBO delta plain had a major role in the recovery of biodiversity which had reduced significantly during the extinction event.

This was enabled by its geographic extent, positioning and hospitable climate and is further attested to by fossilised evidence showing that numerous Triassic organisms originated in this region and expanded their range south afterwards since the harsh climatic conditions of the tropical and sub-tropical regions of Pangaea were non-favourable for habitation and evolution.

== Paleoenvironment ==
The presence and structure of peat recovered from the region suggests that the delta plain was a temperate aerated wetland, suitable for floral growth necessary for peat formation. The limited biodiversity, along with a food web with small number of trophic levels lead to the deposition of organic matter on the anoxic swamp floor, forming highly fibrous, root-based dominant peat. The region also experienced heavy monsoonal rainfall.

== Decline ==
The Carnian-Norian boundary was marked by extinction of several organisms inhabiting the TBO Delta Plain, caused due to repeated floodings as a result of rising sea levels which were made particularly catastrophic by the low gradient of the delta plains, causing the shores lines to shift in excess of 1,000 kilometres (620 miles). This massive shoreline shift lead to the habitat destruction of numerous organisms, specifically the specialised semi aquatic crurotarsians, causing significant environmental stress, reducing their numbers and opening new niches for organisms form the peripheries of the delta plains when the floods receded, thus increasing competition. This devastation of coastal habitats was mirrored worldwide and lead to the fall of the crurotarsians, which had been the main competitors of the dinosaurs up to that point and paved the way for the latter's dominance in the biosphere for the rest of the Mesozoic.

== See also ==
- Paleogeography of Earth during the Triassic
- Paleogeography of Pangaea during the Triassic
