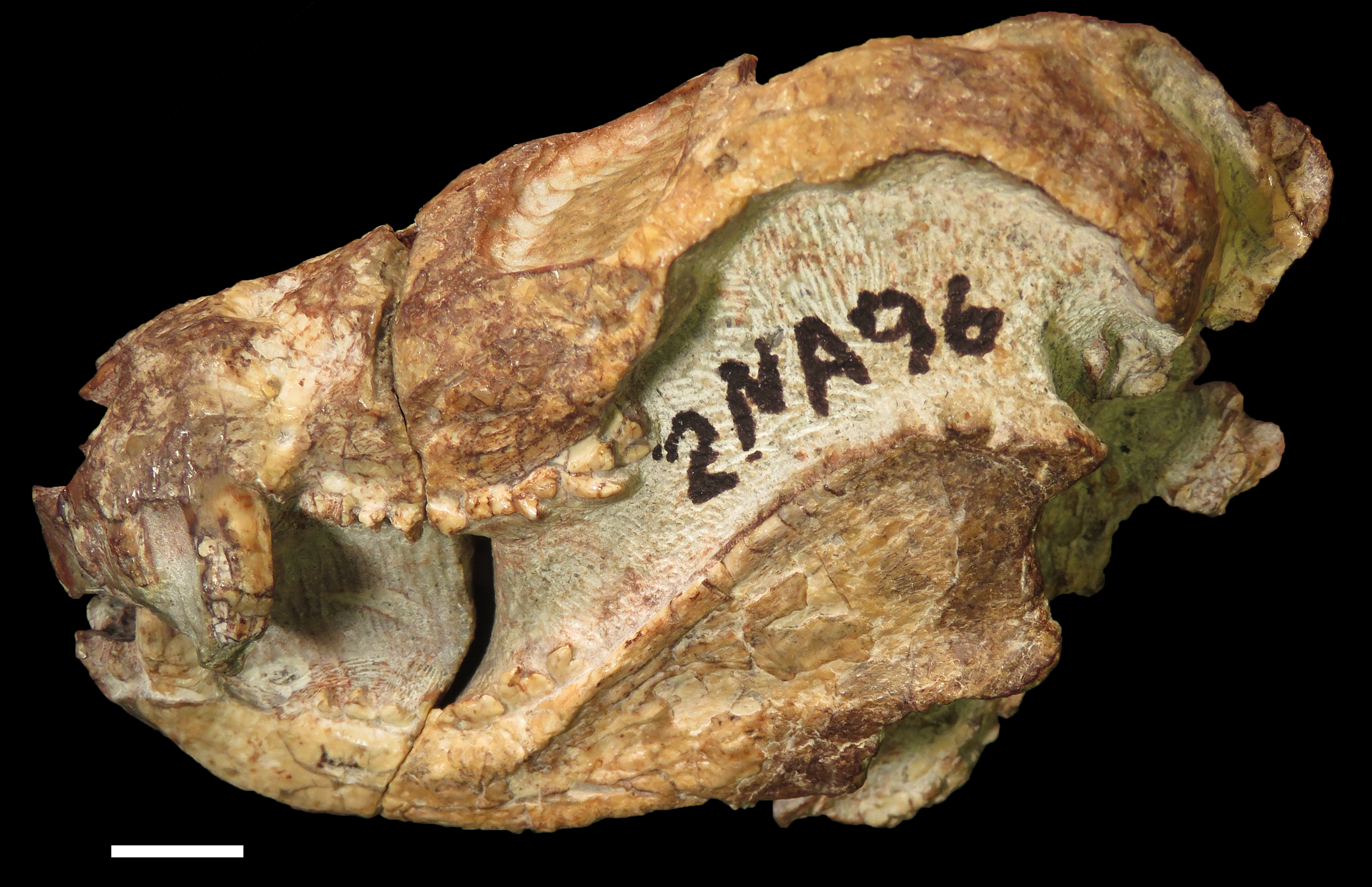
- Skull of Etjoia in left lateral view.

Scientific classification
- Kingdom: Animalia
- Phylum: Chordata
- Clade: Synapsida
- Clade: Therapsida
- Clade: Cynodontia
- Family: †Traversodontidae
- Genus: †Etjoia; Hendrickx et al., 2020
- Species: †E. dentitransitus

Binomial name
- †Etjoia dentitransitus Hendrickx et al., 2020

= Etjoia =

Etjoia Temporal range: 240–235 Ma Middle Triassic–Late Triassic

Extinct genus of cynodonts

Etjoia is an extinct genus of traversodontid cynodonts that lived during the Middle Triassic or Late Triassic period in southern Africa. This medium-sized omnivorous cynognathian provides important information on the dental evolution of early diverging gomphodonts and traversodontids.

== Discovery and etymology ==
Etjoia was discovered in the upper beds of the Omingonde Formation of Namibia (dated to the Ladinian to Carnian) by American paleontologist Charles Schaff in 1996. The specimen was unearthed on the south-eastern side of the Etjo Mountain, in the Waterberg Basin of the Otjozondjupa region, in central north-west Namibia. The holotype is deposited in the Geological Survey of Namibia of Windhoek with the specimen number GSN F1591. The generic name refers to Mount Etjo from which the new genus was unearthed. The type species, E. dentitransitus, refers to the possession of a transitional dentition with sub-circular upper postcanines and a large number of sectorial teeth representing the diademodontid/trirachodontid postcanine pattern, and with sub-rectangular lower postcanines with a mesially positioned transverse crest, which is the classical morphology of lower traversodontid postcanines.

== Description ==
Etjoia is a medium-sized non-strictly herbivorous gomphodont represented by an almost complete skull and a few cervical vertebrae. It was estimated to have a body length ranging from 40 to 55 cm and a body mass of 3.2 kg. This cynodont mainly differs from other gomphodonts by the morphology of its gomphodont postcanines and the high number of its sectorial teeth.

=== Skull ===
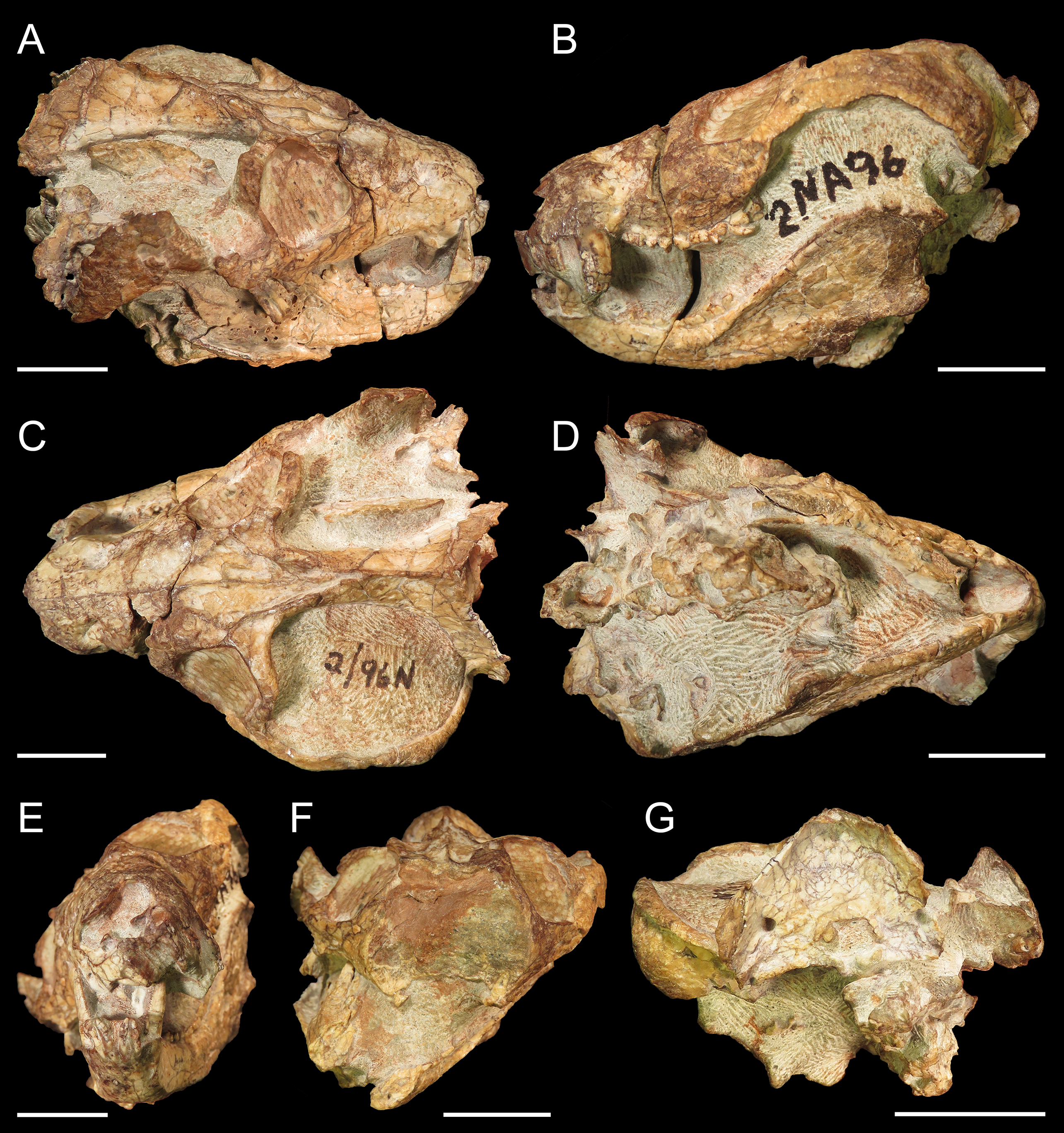
The holotype of Etjoia in A, dorsolateral, B, left lateral, C, dorsal, D, ventral, E, F, anterior and G, posterior views, with F, corresponding to a coronal section of the rostrum and mandible at the level of a main crack through the skull. Scale bars equal 2 cm.

The cranial material of Etjoia consists of an almost complete skull only missing the right zygoma. The cranium, which has a basal skull length of 88.5 mm, is characterized by the absence of a labial shelf in the maxilla.

=== Dentition ===
The dentition comprises four upper and three lower incisors, one upper and one lower canine, and nine upper and eight to nine lower postcanines. The lower incisors bear large apically inclined denticles whereas the upper incisors only have minute denticles. Longitudinal ridges are present in the upper canines. Both upper and lower postcanine teeth include one conical, four gomphodont, and four sectorial postcanines, which is the highest number of sectorial teeth among all traversodontids. Unlike other gomphodonts, the upper gomphodont postcanines are subcircular to elliptical whereas the lower gomphodont teeth are subrectangular and mesiodistally (anteroposteriorly) elongated. The third lower gomphodont postcanine has the particularity of having a low ridge (known as a mesial cingulum) anterior to the prominent transverse crest. The last upper sectorial postcanines are also strongly offset lingually (medially).

=== Postcranial skeleton ===
The postcranial skeleton is only represented by the first five cervical vertebrae.

== Environment ==
The environment in which Etjoia was living in was characterized by meandering streams on a semi-arid loessic floodplain with shallow saline lakes. The floodplain was subject to short, wet winters with heavy thunderstorms followed by long, warm, and dry summers during which dust storms occurred frequently. Etjoia was coexisting with small herbivorous kannemeyeriid dicynodonts and the apex predator Cynognathus, a large carnivorous cynognathian.

== Classification ==
Below is a cladogram from Hendrickx et al. (2020) showing the phylogenetic relationships of Diademodontidae, Trirachodontidae (here recovered as paraphyletic), and early diverging Traversodontidae:

- Cynodontia
  - Thrinaxodon
  - Cynognathia
    - Cynognathus
    - Gomphodontia
      - - Diademodontidae
          - Diademodon
          - Titanogomphodon
        - Neogomphodontia
          - Langbergia
          - Trirachodon
          - - Sinognathinae
              - Beishanodon
              - - Sinognathus
                - Cricodon
            - Traversodontidae
              - - BP/1/5538
                - - CGS JSM 100
                  - - Etjoia
                    - - More derived traversodontids

== See also ==
- List of therapsids
