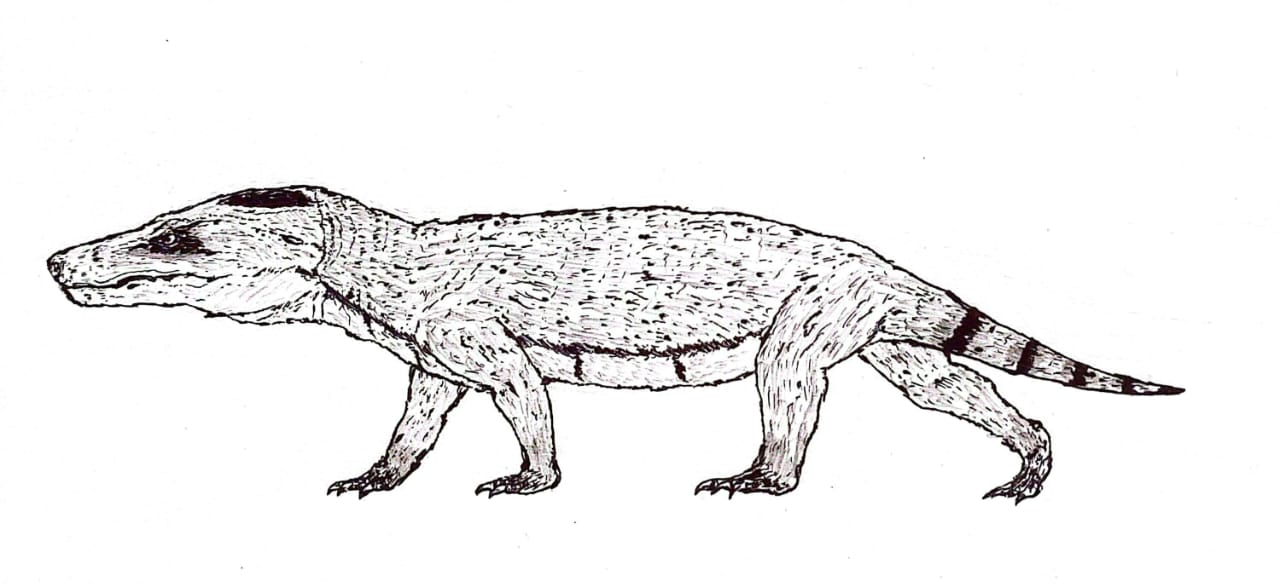
- Life restoration of Impidens hancoxi

Scientific classification
- Kingdom: Animalia
- Phylum: Chordata
- Clade: Synapsida
- Clade: Therapsida
- Clade: Cynodontia
- Family: †Trirachodontidae
- Genus: †Impidens; Tolchard, Kammerer, Butler, Hendrickx, Benoit, Abdala, & Choiniere, 2021

Type species
- Impidens hancoxi Tolchard, Kammerer, Butler, Hendrickx, Benoit, Abdala, & Choiniere, 2021

= Impidens =

Impidens Temporal range: Late Anisian–early Ladinian, possibly early Carnian

Extinct genus of cynodonts

Impidens (Note: From the isiZulu impi "combat" and the Latin dens "tooth") is an extinct genus of large omnivorous cynodont from the Triassic of South Africa and Antarctica. Its type and only species is Impidens hancoxi. (Note: Named in honor of Dr. John Hancox, a pioneering researcher of the strata it was found in.) Impidens inhabited high-latitude environments of southern Gondwana during the Middle Triassic, where it was probably the apex predator.

== History ==
A specimen of Impidens was collected from Antarctica in 1986. In 1995, it was described as an indeterminate diademodontid possibly belonging to Titanogomphodon. The holotype of Impidens hancoxi was found in South Africa in 2014. It was described as a new species in 2021, with the Antarctic specimen and a less complete specimen from South Africa being referred to the species.

== Description ==
Impidens was one of the largest non-mammalian cynodonts, with a skull well over 400 millimetres (16 in) long, though the herbivorous Scalenodontoides from the Late Triassic was even larger.

== Classification ==
Impidens is a member of Trirachodontidae, a family of gomphodont cynodonts. It is closely related to its smaller contemporary Cricodon as well as the earlier Langbergia and Trirachodon. However, the phylogeny of Trirachodontidae is not well-understood, and the family may be paraphyletic, with some species more closely related to traversodontids than others.

== Paleoecology ==
Impidens fossils are known from the Cricodon-Ufudocyclops subzone of the Cynognathus Assemblage Zone of the Beaufort Group in South Africa and the upper Fremouw Formation in Antarctica. The dating of these strata is controversial; they are conventionally regarded as Middle Triassic in age, probably late Anisian or early Ladinian, but a biostratigraphically correlated fauna in South America has been dated to the beginning of the Late Triassic, in the early Carnian. However, another biostratigraphically correlated fauna in China has been dated to the Anisian, suggesting the traditional dating may be correct.

Impidens was probably the apex predator of its environment, as the only other large predator known to have coexisted with it was the somewhat smaller cynodont Cynognathus. The known large herbivores of the fauna are the cynodont Diademodon and the dicynodont Ufudocyclops. A smaller trirachodontid, Cricodon, was also present in the environment.

The Cricodon-Ufudocyclops subzone was deposited in a meandering river environment, with a deep channel and high banks. Both it and the Fremouw Formation were high-paleolatitude environments, which may explain some of the faunal differences between them and lower-paleolatitude fauna.

== Bibliography ==
- Hammer, William R. (1995-03-14). "New Therapsids From the Upper Fremouw Formation (Triassic) of Antarctica". Journal of Vertebrate Paleontology. 15 (1): 105–112. Bibcode:1995JVPal..15..105H. doi:10.1080/02724634.1995.10011210. ISSN 0272-4634.
- Hancox, P.J.; Neveling, J.; Rubidge, B.S. (2020-06-01). "Biostratigraphy of the Cynognathus Assemblage Zone (Beaufort Group, Karoo Supergroup), South Africa". South African Journal of Geology. 123 (2): 217–238. Bibcode:2020SAJG..123..217H. doi:10.25131/sajg.123.0016. eISSN 1996-8590. ISSN 1012-0750.
- Tolchard, Frederick; Kammerer, Christian F.; Butler, Richard J.; Hendrickx, Christophe; Benoit, Julien; Abdala, Fernando; Choiniere, Jonah N. (2021-07-26). "A new large gomphodont from the Triassic of South Africa and its implications for Gondwanan biostratigraphy". Journal of Vertebrate Paleontology. 41 (2) e1929265. Bibcode:2021JVPal..41E9265T. doi:10.1080/02724634.2021.1929265. hdl:11336/147732. ISSN 0272-4634.
