= Guttigomphus =

Guttigomphus Temporal range: Anisian

Scientific classification
- Kingdom: Animalia
- Phylum: Chordata
- Clade: Synapsida
- Clade: Therapsida
- Clade: Cynodontia
- Family: †Trirachodontidae
- Genus: †Guttigomphus; Rayner et al., 2022

Type species
- Guttigomphus avilionis Rayner et al., 2022

Guttigomphus is an extinct genus of trirachodontid that lived in South Africa during the Middle Triassic epoch. It is known from a single species, G. avilionis.
