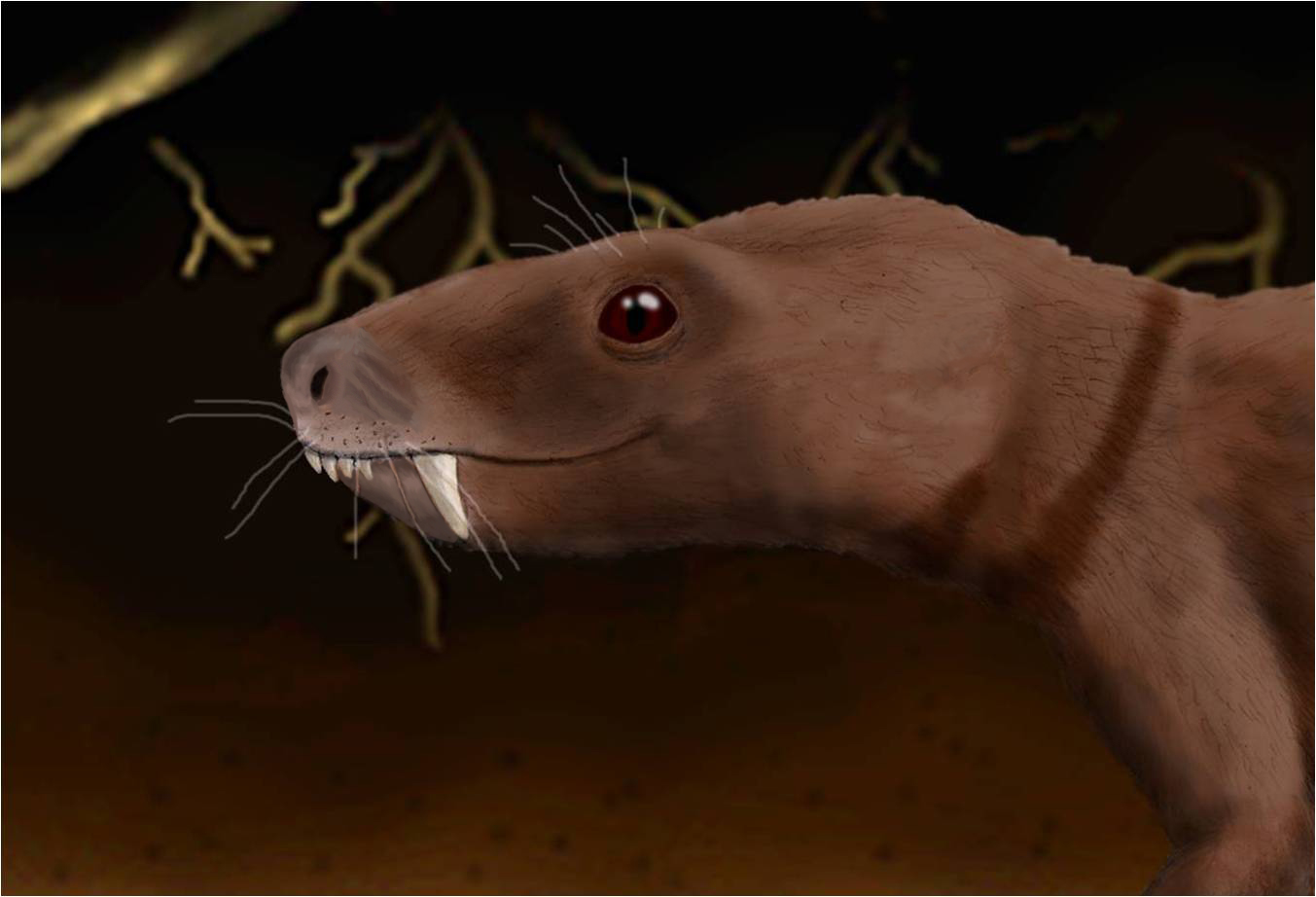
- Life restoration of Trirachodon berryi in a burrow
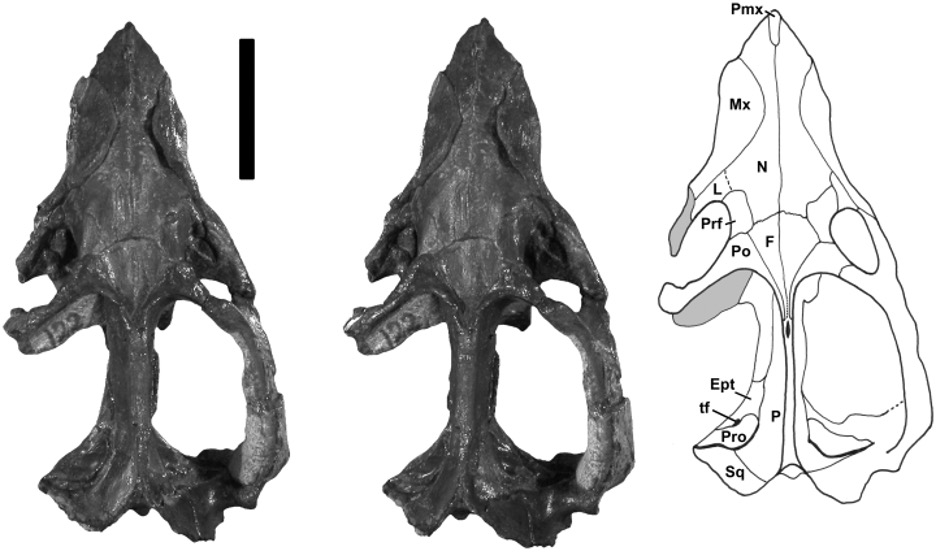
- Skull of Langbergia in dorsal view

Scientific classification
- Kingdom: Animalia
- Phylum: Chordata
- Clade: Synapsida
- Clade: Therapsida
- Clade: Cynodontia
- Clade: †Neogomphodontia
- Family: †Trirachodontidae; Crompton, 1955

Genera
- †Beishanodon; †Cricodon; †Guttigomphus; †Impidens; †Langbergia; †Sinognathus; †Trirachodon

= Trirachodontidae =

Trirachodontids Temporal range: Early - Middle Triassic, 251–237 Ma

Extinct family of cynodonts

Trirachodontidae is an extinct, possibly paraphyletic family of cynognathian cynodonts from the Triassic of China and southern Africa. Trirachodontids appeared during the Early Triassic soon after the Permian-Triassic extinction event and quickly spread over a wide geographic area in a comparatively brief amount of time from 250 to 237 million years ago.

Trirachodontids have wide skulls and short, narrow snouts. Two large holes called temporal fenestrae run along the back of the head and have a uniformly large width. Trirachodontids also have two large canine teeth and smaller cusped postcanines. Most of the features that distinguish trirachodonts from other cynodonts are found in their dentition.

Trirachodontids lived in semi-arid environments with seasonal rainfall. The bone structure of trirachodontids suggests that they grew quickly in seasons with high rainfall and slowly in less favorable seasons. One trirachodontid, Trirachodon, has been found in association with complex burrow systems. These burrows were probably used by many individuals to hide from predators, raise young, or stay warm.

Two subfamilies of trirachodontids are recognized: Trirachodontinae from Africa and Sinognathinae from China. Below is a cladogram from Gao et al. (2010) showing the phylogenetic relationships of trirachodontids:

- Cynognathia
  - Cynognathus
  - Gomphodontia
    - Diademodon
    - - Trirachodontidae
        - Trirachodontinae
          - Trirachodon
          - - Langbergia
            - Cricodon
        - Sinognathinae
          - Beishanodon
          - Sinognathus
      - Traversodontidae

The cladogram above shows a monophyletic Trirachodontidae, but multiple studies have found the family to be paraphyletic with respect to the family Traversodontidae. Below is a cladogram from Hendrickx et al. (2020), who also recovered the members of the subfamily Trirachodontinae as a basal polytomy within the clade Neogomphodontia:

- Cynognathia
  - Cynognathus
  - Gomphodontia
    - Diademodontidae
      - Diademodon
      - Titanogomphodon
    - Neogomphodontia
      - Langbergia
      - Trirachodon
      - - Sinognathinae
          - Beishanodon
          - - Cricodon
            - Sinognathus
        - Traversodontidae
