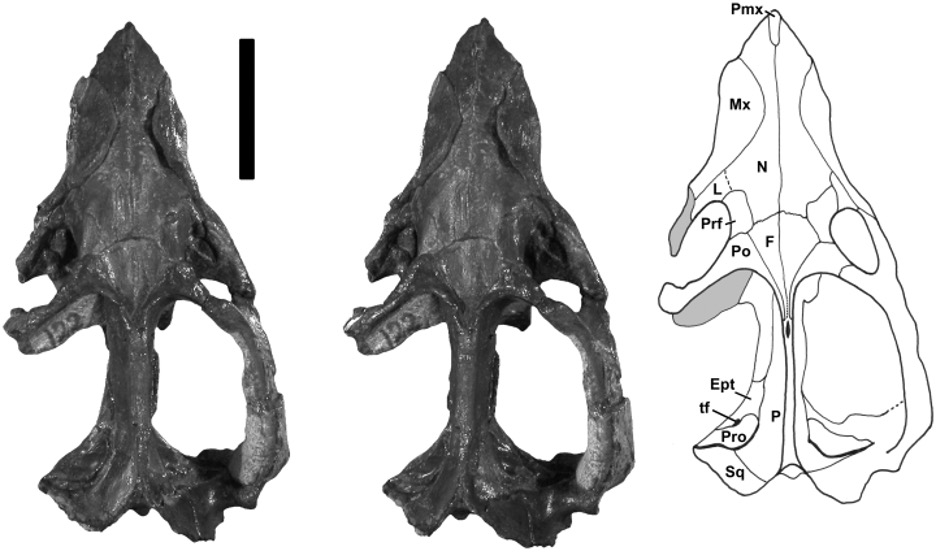
- Figure 2 Stereopair and interpretative drawing of NMQR 3255, holotype of Langbergia modisei, in dorsal view. Ept, epipterygoid; L, lacrimal; Mx, maxilla; N, nasal; F, frontal; P, parietal; Pmx, premaxilla; Po, postorbital; Prf, prefrontal; Pro, prootic; Sq, squamosal; tf, trigeminal foramen (for maxillary and mandibular divisions of the trigeminal nerve). Note that bones in the facial region (maxillae, nasals, lacrimals, and prefrontals) are not in their original position. Shading indicates a broken portion (in the jugal) and sediment posteriorly of the postorbital bar. Scale bar = 3 cm.

Scientific classification
- Kingdom: Animalia
- Phylum: Chordata
- Clade: Synapsida
- Clade: Therapsida
- Clade: Cynodontia
- Family: †Trirachodontidae
- Subfamily: †Trirachodontinae
- Genus: †Langbergia; Abdala et al., 2006

Species
- L. modisei Abdala et al., 2006 (type)

= Langbergia =

Langbergia Temporal range: Early Triassic, 251–247 Ma

Extinct genus of cynodonts

Langbergia is an extinct genus of trirachodontid cynodont from the Early Triassic of South Africa. The type and only species L. modisei was named in 2006 after the farm where the holotype was found, Langberg 566. Langbergia was found in the Burgersdorp Formation in the Beaufort Group, a part of the Cynognathus Assemblage Zone. The closely related trirachodontids Trirachodon and Cricodon were found in the same area.

== History of discovery ==
Langbergia was discovered in the Cynognathus Assemblage Zone of the Beaufort Group of South Africa in 2006. It was named after the farm where the holotype was found (Langberg 566).

== Description and paleobiology ==
Trirachodontids are distinguishable due to the shape of their postcanines; the postcanines, distal to the canines, are transversely widened teeth with three main cusps disposed in a transverse row across the center of the tooth. Langbergia are small gomphodontian cynodonts. Cynodonts are a very important component of the Triassic. After the Langbergia fossil was found in 2006, new diagnostic features allowed for a new taxon, Langbergia modisei. Unlike other Trirachodontids, the upper and lower gomphodont post caninines of Langbergia are elliptical in cross section, slightly labiolingually elongated and their long axis is longuomesially orientated. Additionally, both upper and lower lower gomphodont postcanines of Langbergia increase tooth size up until the penultimate tooth and the medial and distal basins are deep and mesiodistally short Trirachodontids Trirachodon and Cricodon have a labial platform of the maxilla that arises lateral to the postcanine series, this is not observed in Langbergia. Langbergia has been recorded having stapes, despite how fragile the structure is.

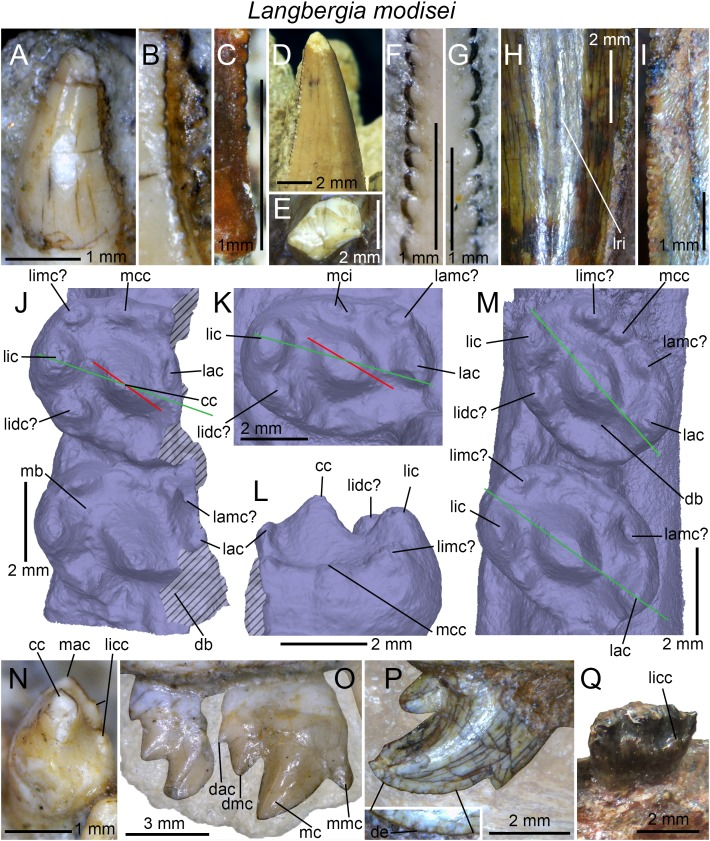
Dentition of Langbergia modisei

Langbergia, like most other living in the Permian, went extinct during the end-Permian mass extinction.

== Geological information ==
The Burgersdorp Formation in South Africa is known for having a substantial amount of fossiliferous rocks. The Permo-Triassic strata of the Beaufort Group has a substantial amount of therapsid fossils which are used in the biostratigraphic subdivision. The uppermost division is the Cynognathus Assemblage Zone, this zone covers the late early and early middle Triassic. The Cynognathus Assemblage Zone is then divided into a threefold subdivision. The uppermost subdivision of the Cynognathus Assemblage Zone is named the Lystrosaurus Assemblage Zone. The upper boundary of the Lystrosaurus Assemblage Zone is drawn at the Langbergia and the Garjainia.

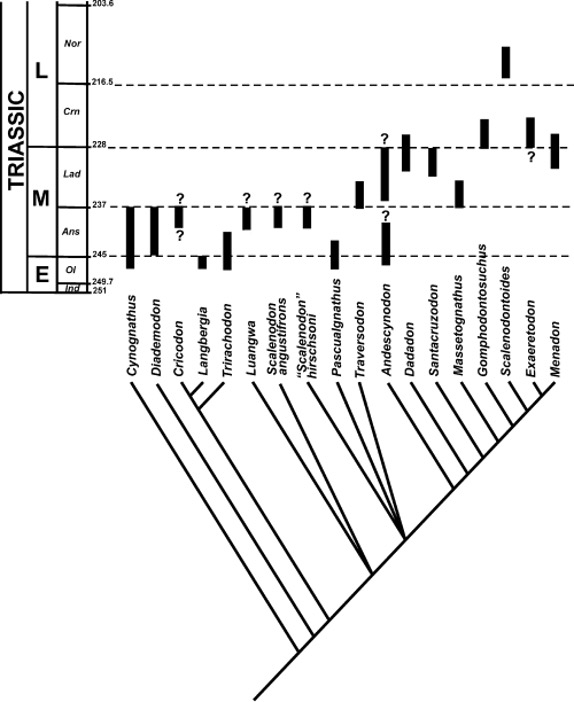
Figure 13 Majority-rule consensus tree of the analysis with characters having equal weights plotted against the geological time scale to indicate temporal distribution of the taxa included in the analysis (see Appendix 1). The geological time scale is based on Gradstein & Ogg (2004). Ans, Anisian; Crn, Carnian; E, Early; Ind, Induan; L, Late; Lad, Ladinian; M, Middle; Nor, Norian; Ol, Olenekian.
