= Titanogomphodon =

Titanogomphodon Temporal range: Anisian ~247–242 Ma

Scientific classification
- Kingdom: Animalia
- Phylum: Chordata
- Clade: Synapsida
- Clade: Therapsida
- Clade: Cynodontia
- Family: †Diademodontidae
- Genus: †Titanogomphodon; Keyser, 1973

Type species
- †T. crassus Keyser, 1973

Extinct genus of cynodonts

Titanogomphodon is an extinct genus of diademodontid cynodonts from the Middle Triassic Omingonde Formation of Namibia. It is known from a single partial skull that was described in 1973 from the Omingonde Formation. The type and only species is Titanogomphodon crassus. At about 40 centimetres (16 in), the skull of Titanogomphodon was significantly larger than that of its closest relative, Diademodon (hundreds of skulls of Diademodon are known and none exceed 29 centimetres (11 in) in length). Its teeth are similar to those of another group of cynodonts called Traversodontidae, but the similarities are likely the result of convergent evolution. Aside from its larger size, Titanogomphodon differs from Diademodon in having a bony projection on the postorbital bar behind the eye socket.

== Diet ==
Like Diademodon, Titanogomphodon was probably herbivorous. It is part of a very diverse fossil assemblage in the Omingonde Formation that includes several other types of cynodonts, including Diademodon, Cynognathus, and Trirachodon, as well as other therapsids such as Dolichuranus and Herpetogale. The Omingonde assemblage was part of a larger continental fauna that ranged across much of Gondwana during the Middle Triassic.

== Other finds ==
An isolated upper jaw of a diademodontid described from the Fremouw Formation of Antarctica in 1995 was suggested to potentially belong to Titanogomphodon based on its large size. However, since the only known fossil of Titanogomphodon is a lower jaw, the two specimens cannot be assigned with certainty to the same taxon. In 2021, the specimen was assigned to a new species of trirachodontid, Impidens hancoxi, which reached an even larger size than Titanogomphodon.
