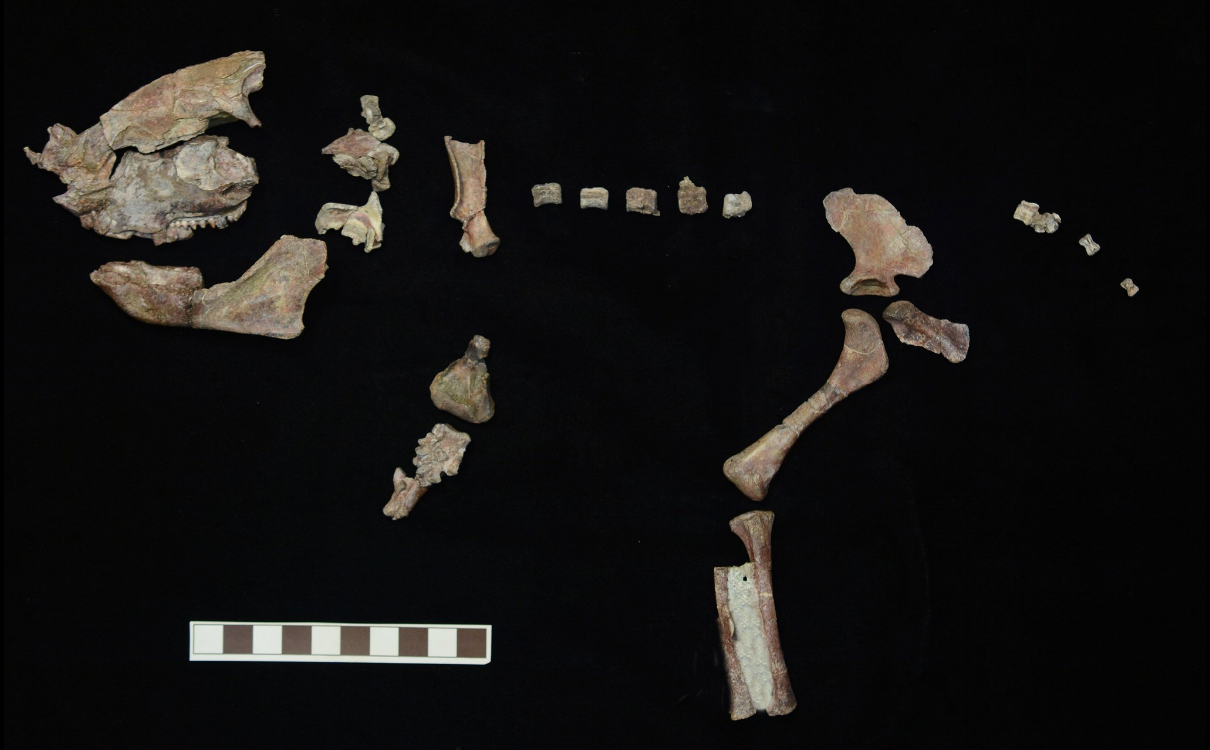
- The partial skeletal reconstruction of Cricodon metabolus with a tool as reference for size.

Scientific classification
- Kingdom: Animalia
- Phylum: Chordata
- Clade: Synapsida
- Clade: Therapsida
- Clade: Cynodontia
- Clade: †Neogomphodontia
- Genus: †Cricodon; A. W. Crompton, 1955

Type species
- †C. metabolus

= Cricodon =

Cricodon Temporal range: 251–242 Ma Early Triassic–Middle Triassic

Extinct genus of cynodonts

Cricodon is an extinct genus of trirachodontid cynodonts that lived during the Early Triassic and Middle Triassic periods of Africa. A. W. Crompton named Cricodon based on the ring-like arrangement of the cuspules on the crown of a typical postcanine tooth. The epithet of the type species, C. metabolus, indicates the change in structure of certain postcanines resulting from replacement.

== Discovery ==
Cricodon was first discovered in the Tanzanian Manda Beds of South Africa. Broili & Schröder (1936) were the first to describe Cricodon, yet were not able to provide a name for the taxon, which at the time was only known from 5 teeth. Extensive and in-depth descriptions of fossils from the Manda Beds were provided by A. W. Crompton (1955). Crompton provided the name Cricodon as more fossil discoveries were found and a more complete view of the skeleton could be created.

Fossil evidence of Cricodon has also been discovered in the Karoo Beds, specifically in the Cynognathus Assemblage Zone of South Africa. The Cynognathus Assemblage Zone encompasses the boundary between the late Early and early Middle Triassic period, and has been subdivided into three distinct subzones (Subzone A, Subzone B, and Subzone C) based primarily on the spatial and temporal ranges of key temnospondyl index taxa. Cricodon fossils have been found in the youngest of the three subzones, Subzone C. However, upper postcanines resembling those of Cricodon are also known from deposits corresponding to Subzone B.

The trirachodontid "Trirachodon" kannemeyeri Seeley, 1895 is now referred to Cricodon as C. kannemeyeri.

== Description ==
=== Skull ===
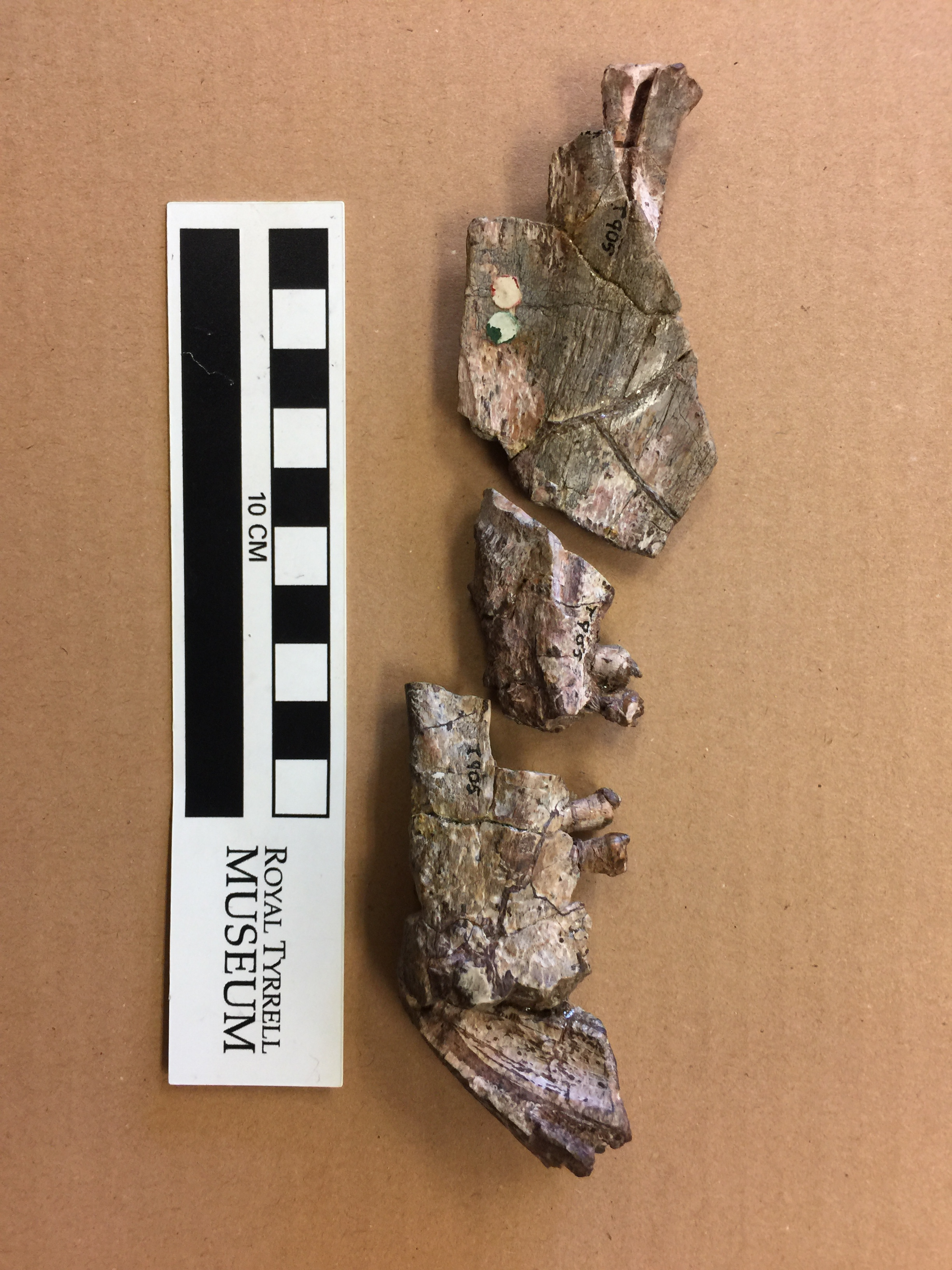
A lower right dentary of Cricdon metabolus with tool provided for size reference

Cranial bones recovered from the Manda Beds consist of a badly crushed orbito-ethmoidal region, a practically complete right mandible, two fragments of the left mandible, several loose teeth, a portion of the occiput, and several unidentified fragments.

In the upper jaw, only the posterior ends of the maxillae, a portion of the palate, and the floor of the orbits are well preserved. The maxillary postcanines are transversely ovate and have three main cusps arranged upon the same transverse plane. The three main cusps are composed of the lingual, central, and labial cusp. There are also small peripheral cuspules present on the anterior and posterior borders of the crown. Roots of the upper postcanines are long, transversely flattened near the crown and taper away to a short point distally. The maximum known transverse diameter of the maxillary postcanines is 13mm.

A characteristic feature of the mandible is the sharp angle formed by the junction of the lower margin of the dentary and the anterior surface of the dental symphysis. A diagnostic difference between the upper jaw postcanine teeth and mandibular postcanine teeth is that mandibular postcanine teeth tend to be squarer in horizontal sections in contrast to the transversely ovate maxillary postcanines. A mammalian feature that can be seen in gomphodont cynodonts is that each root is surrounded by a pocket of cancellous bone. The maximum transverse diameter of the mandibular postcanines is 9mm.

The main cusps of the mandibular and maxillary postcanines form a transverse ridge across the center of the crown. The transverse ridge of a tooth would fit into the depression formed between the transverse ridges of two adjoining teeth. Recent research conducted by Hendrickx, Abdala, and Choiniere (2016) has revealed new information in regard to the distribution of enamel microstructure in non-mammaliform cynodonts, specifically in Cricodon metabolus. Their research uncovered the presence of columnar divergence units in both the sectorial and gomphodont teeth of a trirachodontid along with the consistent presence of synapsid columnar enamel in cynognathians.

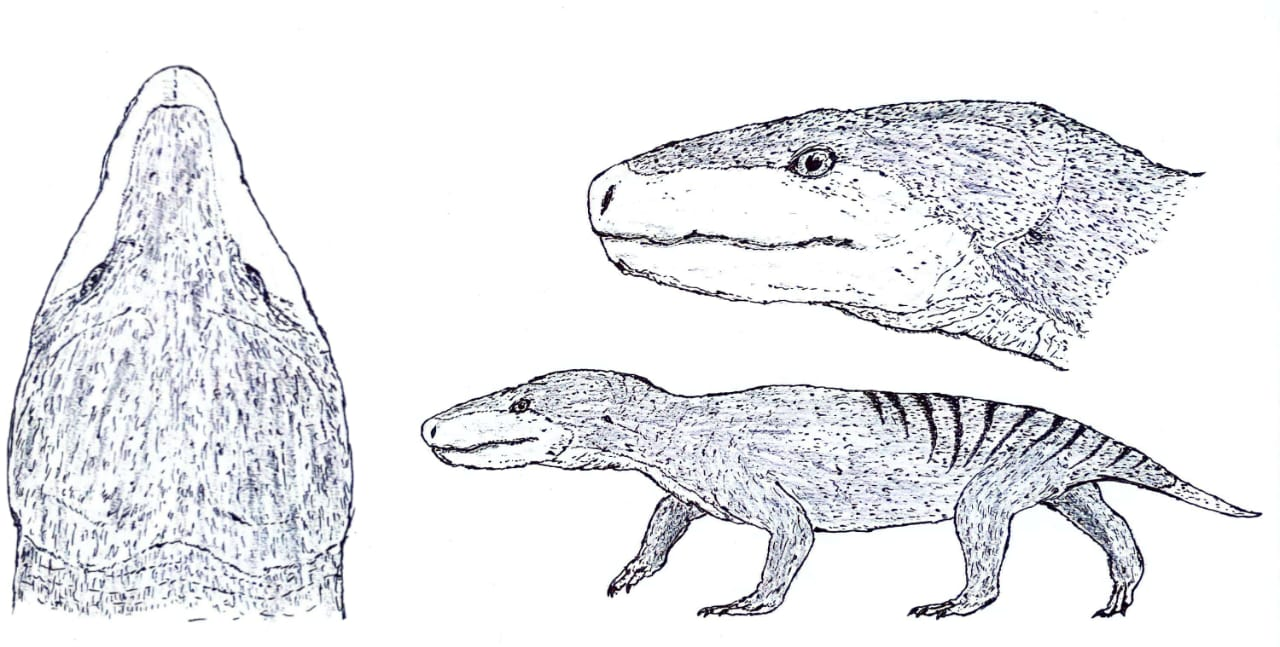
Reconstruction of Cricodon kannemeyeri.

The newfound discovery in regards to the thickened enamel has many ecological implications. In Cricodon metabolus, the enamel layer of the gomphodont tooth is around 11.5 times thicker than the sectorial tooth. The postcanine gomphodont teeth (labiolingually expanded teeth with large occlusal surfaces) were used for chewing, crushing, and grinding fibrous plant material, meaning that they were under higher loads and apically oriented stresses. Sectorial teeth on the other hand were used to shear plant material and were not subjected to the same types of occlusal stresses, therefore the enamel thickness was not maintained. Another reason proposed by Hendrickx, Abdala, and Choiniere (2016) to explain the thin enamel in sectorial teeth is due to replacement timing and patterns, as they will be sequentially replaced by gomphodont teeth. Another characteristic that was observed in the gomphodont teeth were enamel and dentine incremental lines. The enamel and dentine incremental lines, odontoblast tubules in dentine, and discontinuous columnar divergence units in enamel support the consistent presence of synapsid columnar enamel in Cynognathia.

=== Postcranial skeleton ===
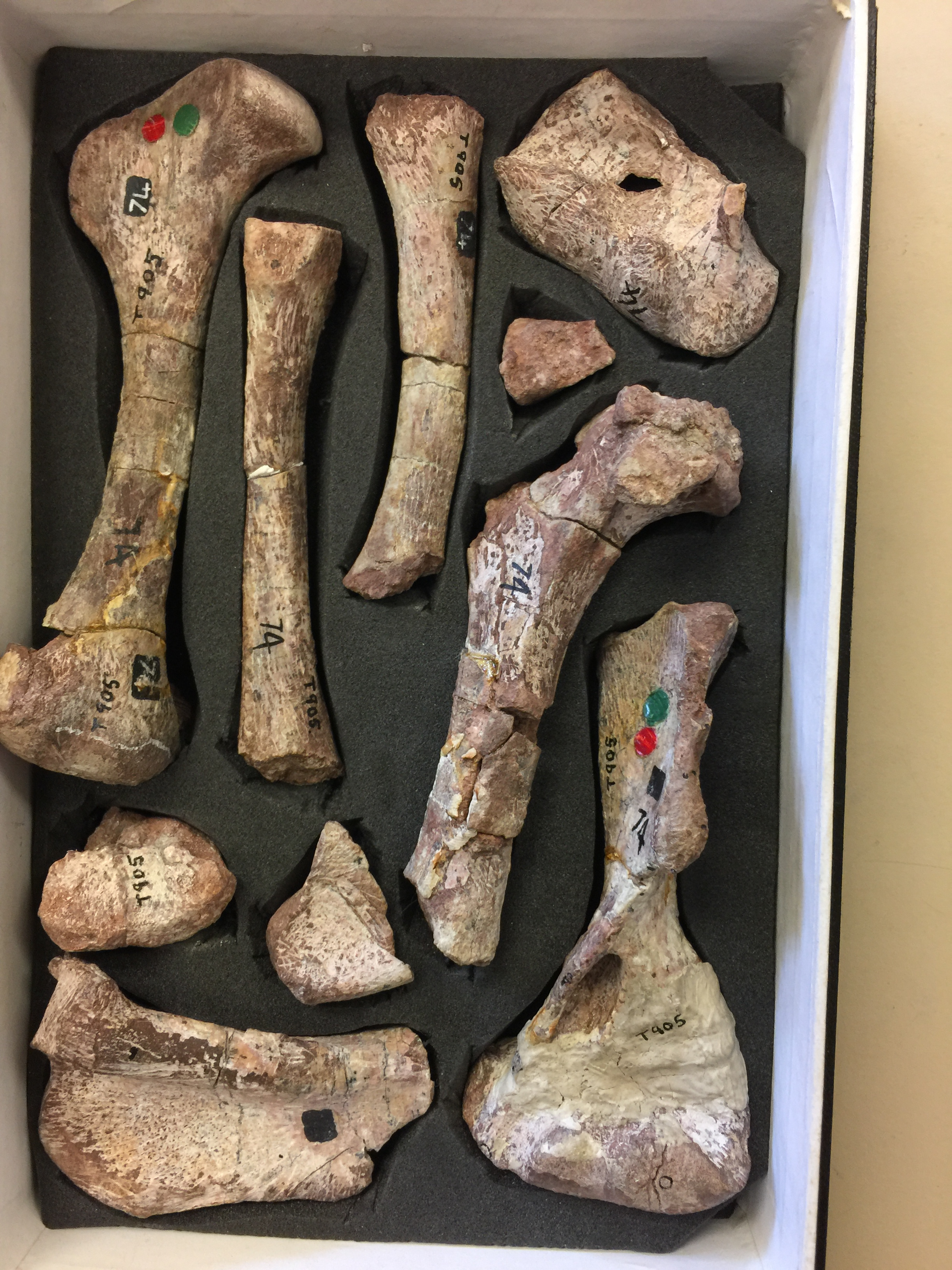
An array of various postcranial bones of Cricodon metabolus

Twenty-five vertebrae were discovered which belong to the dorsal and sacral regions with only one vertebra having a well preserved neural arch from the sacral region. There are additional apophyses below the posterior zygapophysis which articulate with concavities on the lateral surface of the neural arch, posterior and inferior to the anterior zygapophysis. Cricodon metabolus has the typical cynodont expanded ribs of which thirteen dorsal ribs were discovered.

The entire humerus was 12.5 cm long and had typical cynodont characterizations such as the twisted bone and the plane of the distal end forming an angle of 40 degrees with that of the proximal. The discovered femur was 12.5 cm long with the capitulum directed at an angle of 45 to 50 degrees to the main axis of the slender shaft. Another characteristic of the femur noted is that it projects well forward from the main body of the shaft. Although little is known of the hand of cynodonts, it is believed that Cricodon metabolus has a phalangeal formula of 23443, with the second phalange reduced in digits three and four.

== Classification ==
Below is a cladogram from Gao et al. (2010) showing the phylogenetic relationships of one part of the Cynodontia relative to Cricodon:

- Cynognathia
  - Cynognathus
  - Gomphodontia
    - Diademodon
    - - Trirachodontidae
        - Trirachodontinae
          - Trirachodon
          - - Langbergia
            - Cricodon
        - Sinognathinae
          - Beishanodon
          - Sinognathus
      - Traversodontidae

== See also ==
- List of therapsids
