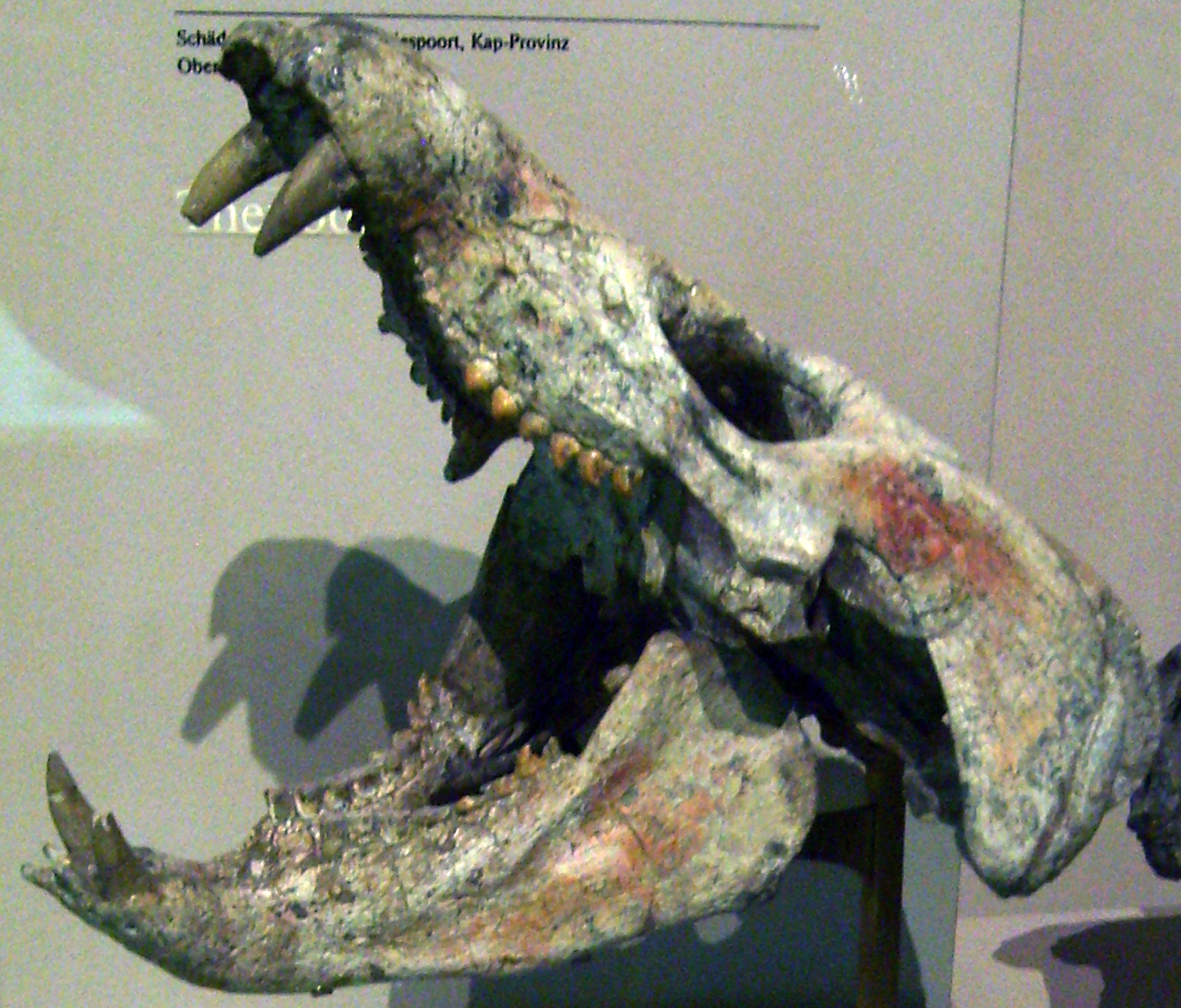
- Skull of the diademodontid Diademodon tetragonus

Scientific classification
- Kingdom: Animalia
- Phylum: Chordata
- Clade: Synapsida
- Clade: Therapsida
- Clade: Cynodontia
- Clade: †Gomphodontia
- Family: †Diademodontidae; Haughton, 1925

Genera
- †Diademodon; †Titanogomphodon

= Diademodontidae =

Diademodontids Temporal range: Middle Triassic, 247–237 Ma

Extinct family of cynodonts

Diademodontidae is an extinct family of Triassic gomphodonts. The best-known genus is Diademodon from South Africa. Titanogomphodon from Namibia may also be a member of Diademodontidae. The Chinese genera Hazhenia and Ordosiodon have also been included in the family, but were more recently identified as baurioid therocephalians. Remains of a diademodontid were reported in the Early-Middle Triassic Fremouw Formation in Antarctica, but that specimen was later referred to the trirachodontid Impidens.
