= Beishanodon =

Beishanodon Temporal range: Early Triassic

Scientific classification
- Domain: Eukaryota
- Kingdom: Animalia
- Phylum: Chordata
- Clade: Synapsida
- Clade: Therapsida
- Clade: Cynodontia
- Family: †Trirachodontidae
- Subfamily: †Sinognathinae
- Genus: †Beishanodon; Gao et al., 2010

Species
- †B. youngi Gao et al., 2010

Extinct genus of cynodonts

Beishanodon is an extinct genus of eucynodonts from Lower Triassic of China. The type and only species is Beishanodon youngi.
