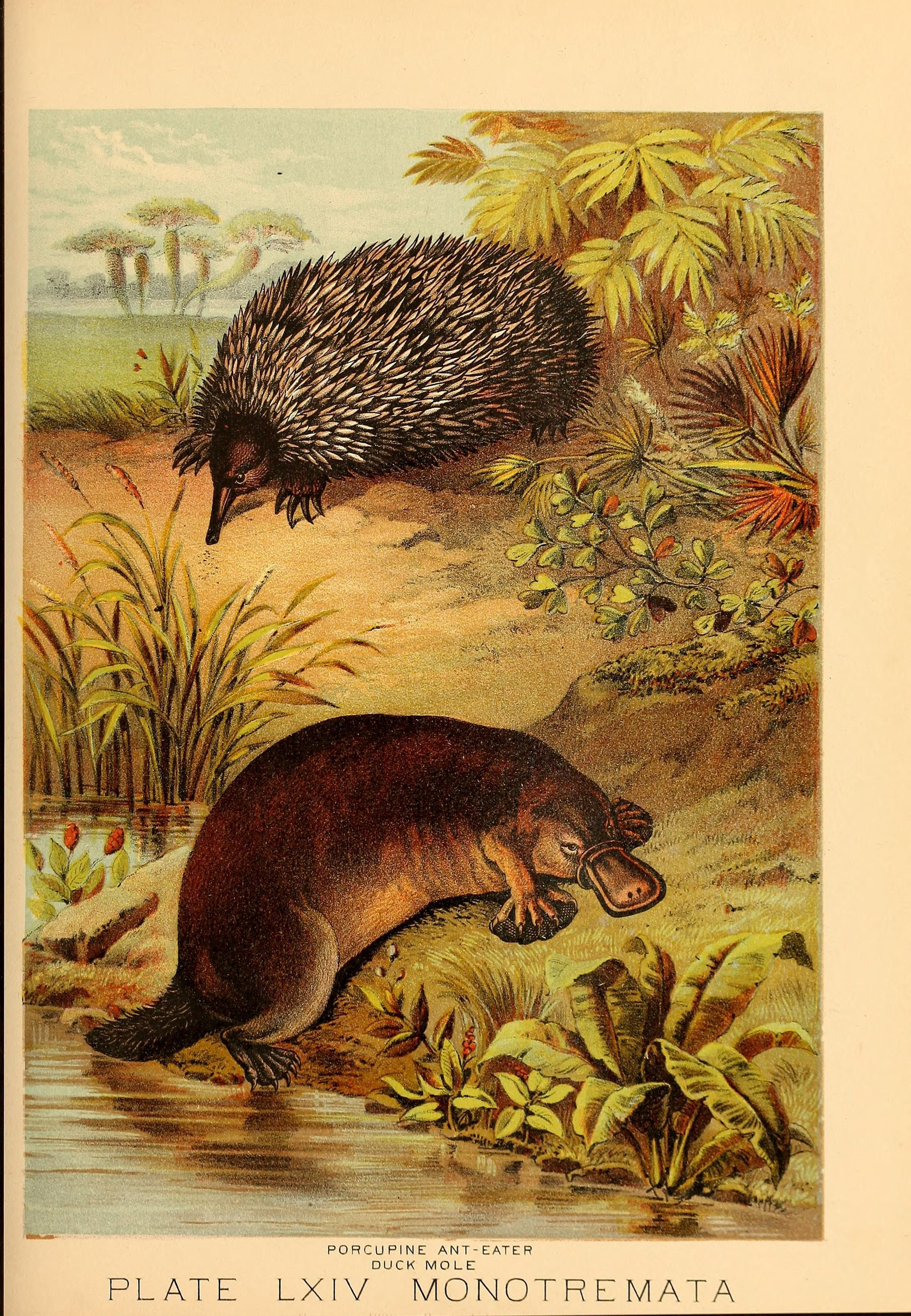
- Two extant ornithorhynchoids: the short-beaked echidna (above) and platypus (below)

Scientific classification
- Kingdom: Animalia
- Phylum: Chordata
- Class: Mammalia
- Order: Monotremata
- Superfamily: Ornithorhynchoidea; Flannery et al., 2024

Families
- †Opalionidae; Ornithorhynchidae; Tachyglossidae
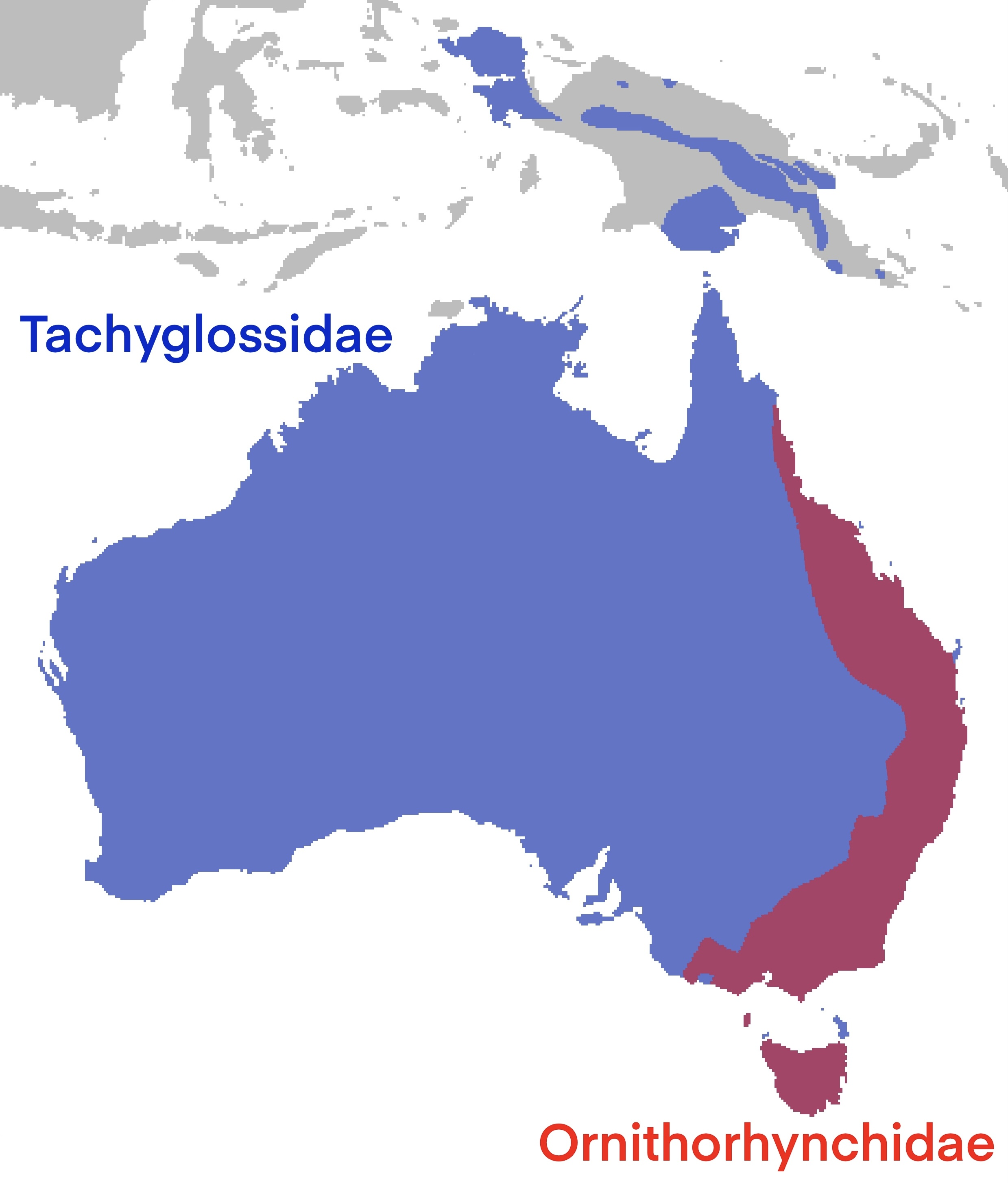
- Range of extant ornithorhynchoids

= Ornithorhynchoidea =

Ornithorhynchoids Temporal range: Late Cretaceous (Cenomanian)–present

Superfamily of monotreme mammals

Ornithorhynchoidea is a superfamily of egg-laying mammals containing the only living monotremes, the platypus and the echidnas, as well as their closest fossil relatives, to the exclusion of more primitive fossil monotremes of uncertain affinity.

The clade was defined in 2024 following the discovery of some fossil monotremes from the Late Cretaceous (Cenomanian)-aged Griman Creek Formation of Lightning Ridge Australia, which appeared to be more closely related to extant monotremes than to co-occurring early monotremes such as Steropodon and Kollikodon.

== Taxonomy ==
Opalios, the only described member of the extinct family Opalionidae, is considered the most basal ornithorhynchoid due to its unique combination of ancestral and derived traits.

The presence of the probable stem-ornithorhynchids Dharragarra and Patagorhynchus in the Late Cretaceous implies that the divergence between the platypus and echidnas may have occurred during this time. However, genetic estimates tend to prefer a Cenozoic divergence between these two extant groups.

Although most members of this group—extinct and extant—are known from Australia, at least two ornithorhynchid-like forms reached southern South America during the Maastrichtian (Patagorhynchus) and early Paleocene (Monotrematum).

The following genera are known:

- Superfamily Ornithorhynchoidea Flannery et al., 2024
  - Family †Opalionidae Flannery et al., 2024
    - Genus †Opalios Flannery et al., 2024
  - Family Ornithorhynchidae Gray, 1825
    - Genus ?†Dharragarra Flannery et al., 2024
    - Genus ?†Monotrematum Pascual et al., 1992
    - Genus †Obdurodon Woodburne & Tedford, 1975
    - Genus ?†Patagorhynchus Chimento et al., 2023
    - Genus Ornithorhynchus Blumenbach, 1800
  - Family Tachyglossidae Gill, 1872
    - Genus †Megalibgwilia Griffiths, Wells & Barrie, 1991
    - Genus †Murrayglossus Flannery et al., 2022
    - Genus Tachyglossus Illiger, 1811
    - Genus Zaglossus Gill, 1877

They can be distinguished from other fossil monotremes by their twisted-shaped dentaries, with the lingual surfaces being dorsoventrally flattened (aside from in echidnas).
