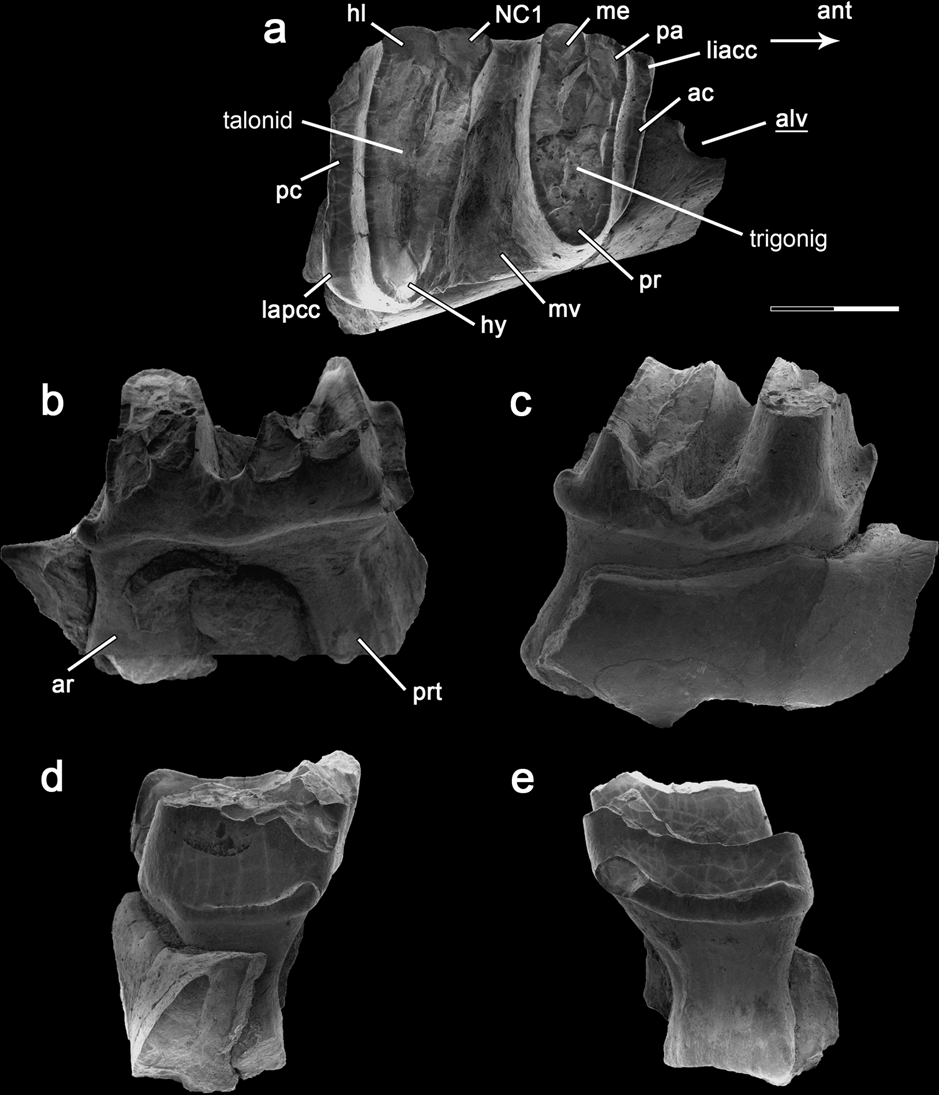
- Holotype specimen

Scientific classification
- Kingdom: Animalia
- Phylum: Chordata
- Class: Mammalia
- Order: Monotremata
- Family: Ornithorhynchidae (?)
- Genus: †Patagorhynchus; Chimento et al., 2023
- Species: †P. pascuali

Binomial name
- †Patagorhynchus pascuali Chimento et al., 2023

= Patagorhynchus =

Patagorhynchus Temporal range: Late Cretaceous, early Maastrichtian

Extinct genus of monotremes

Patagorhynchus is a genus of prehistoric monotreme mammal from the Late Cretaceous (early Maastrichtian) Chorrillo Formation of Santa Cruz Province, Argentina. The genus contains a single species, Patagorhynchus pascuali. The holotype, MPM-PV-23087, consists of a lower right molar attached to a fragment of the dentary. Based on comparisons with the closely related Obdurodon, it is estimated to have weighed ~1.58 kg. It was collected near Rio Gallegos, Santa Cruz, Argentina in 2022 and is housed in the Museo Padre Molina.

== Etymology ==
The first part of the genus name, Patago, refers to Patagonia and Ancient Greek ῥύγχος (rhúnkhos), meaning "snout". The species name pascuali honors Argentine paleomammalogist Rosendo Pascual.

== Evolution ==
Patagorynchus represents the oldest known monotreme species from South America, indicating that they had already arrived in the region by the end of the Cretaceous, and were present in Antarctica during the Late Cretaceous.

== Classification ==
Chimento et al. (2023) recovered Patagorhynchus as a monotreme mammal. The simplified results of their phylogenetic analyses are shown in the cladogram below:

- Monotremaformes
  - †Steropodon
  - - †Teinolophos
    - Monotremata
      - Tachyglossus (short-beaked echidna)
      - †Patagorhynchus
      - †Monotrematum
      - †Obdurodon
      - Ornithorhynchus (platypus)
