= Griman Creek Formation =

Geological formation in Australia

- Stratigraphic range: late Albian-early-mid Cenomanian; ~106–98 Ma
- Type: Geological formation
- Unit of: Rolling Downs Group
- Sub-units: Coocoran Claystone & Wallangulla Sandstone Members
- Underlies: Unconformity with Oligo-Miocene Cumborah Gravel
- Overlies: Surat Siltstone, Wallumbilla Formation
- Thickness: Up to 345 m (1,132 ft)

Lithology
- Primary: Sandstone, siltstone, mudstone
- Other: Conglomerate, coal

Location
- Coordinates: 29.4°S 147.7°E
- Approximate paleocoordinates: 64.4°S 134.9°E
- Region: Queensland; New South Wales
- Country: Australia
- Extent: Surat Basin

Type section
- Named for: Griman Creek
- Named by: Reiser
- Year defined: 1970
- Griman Creek Formation (Australia)

The Griman Creek Formation is a geological formation in northern New South Wales and southern Queensland, Australia whose strata date back to the Albian-Cenomanian stages of the mid-Cretaceous. It is most notable being a major source of opal, found near the town of Lightning Ridge, New South Wales. Alongside the opal opalised fossils are also found, including those of dinosaurs and primitive monotremes.

== Description ==
As a whole, the formation primarily consists of thinly bedded medium to fine sandstone, siltstone and mudstone, with sporadic coal seams. In the vicinity of Lightning Ridge, it is divided up into two informal members the underlying Wallangulla Sandstone Member which primarily consists of red fine grained sandstone, light siltstone and grey claystone and is up to 30 metres (98 ft) thick while the overlying Coocoran Claystone consists of about 10 metres of claystone. The contact between the two units is sudden and unconformable. Discontinuous clay lens beds within the Wallangulla Sandstone Member near Lightning Ridge, referred to as the Finch Clay Facies, are one of Australia's primary sources of commercial precious opal, with many mines dug in the area. These deposits are also the primary source of fossils within the formation, a large proportion of which are preserved as semi-precious opalized pseudomorphs. The fauna found in lightning ridge indicates that the depositional environment of the Finch Clay Facies was in near-coastal freshwater lagoons.

== Background ==
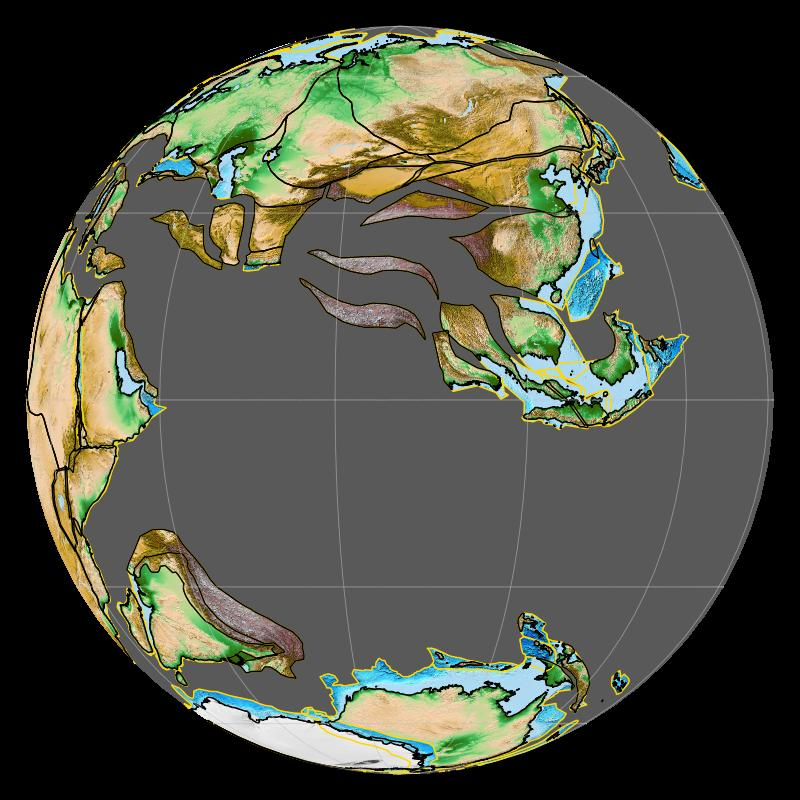
Australia was located near the South Pole in the Early and Middle Cretaceous GPlates reconstruction for 100 Ma (Albian-Cenomanian and Early and Late Cretaceous boundary)

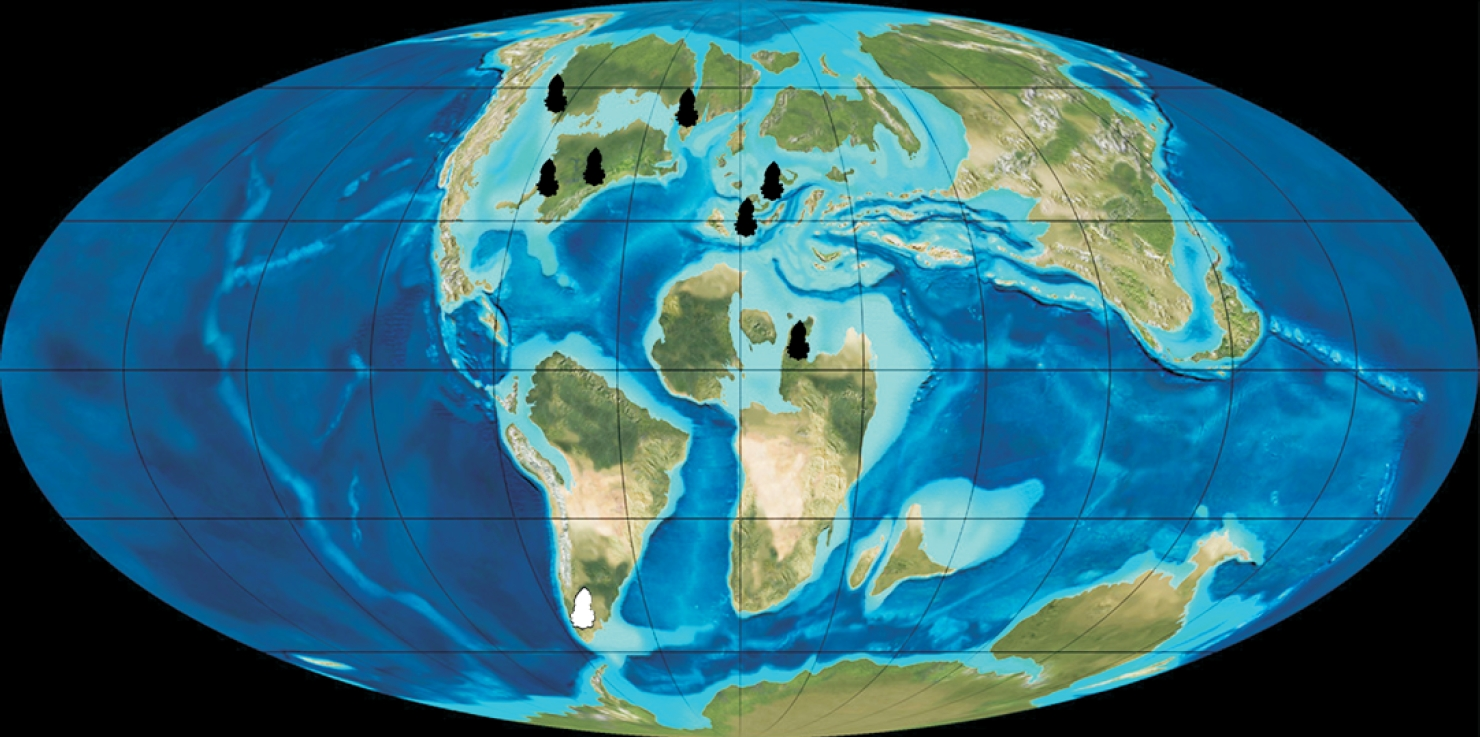
Paleogeography of the Turonian (90 Ma) Original map by Ron Blakey

== Fossil content ==
Indeterminate avialan, euornithopod, and sauropod remains that were once misidentified as brachiosaurid are present in New South Wales, Australia. Euornithopod tracks are also present in New South Wales.

Color key: Taxon / Reclassified taxon / Taxon falsely reported as present / Dubious taxon or junior synonym / Ichnotaxon / Ootaxon / Morphotaxon

Notes
Uncertain or tentative taxa are in small text
~~crossed out~~ taxa are discredited.

=== Dinosaurs ===
==== Ornithischians ====
Indeterminate ornithopods and iguanodontians are known from the formation. Indeterminate avetheropods and megaraptorans are known from the formation.

Ornithischians of the Griman Creek Formation
Genus	Species	Location	Stratigraphic position	Material	Notes	Image
Ankylosauria Indet.	Indeterminate			Osteoderm		
Elasmaria indet.	Indeterminate	New South Wales, Australia		An articulated hindlimb comprising the femur, tibia, astragalus		
Fostoria	F. dhimbangunmal	New South Wales, Australia			A elasmarian ornithopod	
Fulgurotherium	F. australe	New South Wales, Australia			An indeterminate ornithischian	
Weewarrasaurus	W. pobeni	New South Wales, Australia		Isolated dentary	A non-iguanodontian ornithopod	

==== Sauropods ====
Two species of titanosauriforms and one species of titanosaur are known from teeth.

Sauropods of the Griman Creek Formation
Genus	Species	Location	Stratigraphic position	Material	Notes	Image
Sauropoda Indet.	Indeterminate			Five morphotypes of teeth indicating at least two distinct non-titanosaur titanosauriform species and one titanosaur species.	An indeterminate sauropod	

==== Theropods ====
Theropods of the Griman Creek Formation
Genus	Species	Location	Stratigraphic position	Material	Notes	Image
Enantiornithes Indet.	Indeterminate			Partial femora		
Megaraptora Indet. ("Lightning Claw")	Indeterminate	New South Wales, Australia		Partial skeleton including parts of the lower arm, claws, lower leg, part of the hip, and pieces of ribs.		
Noasauridae Indet.	Indeterminate			Cervical vertebra		
Rapator	R. ornitholestoides	New South Wales, Australia		"Manual element"	A megaraptoran theropod	
Walgettosuchus	W. woodwardi	New South Wales, Australia		"Vertebra"	An indeterminate theropod	

=== Pterosaurs ===
Pterosaurs of the Griman Creek Formation
Genus	Species	Location	Stratigraphic position	Material	Notes	Image
Anhangueria Indet.	Indeterminate			"two isolated tooth crowns", possible limb elements		

=== Crocodylomorphs ===
Crocodylomorphs of the Griman Creek Formation
Genus	Species	Location	Stratigraphic position	Material	Notes	Image
Isisfordia	I. molnari	Lightning Ridge, New South Wales, Australia		Braincase and referred maxillary fragment	A neosuchian metasuchian	

=== Turtles ===
Turtle of the Griman Creek Formation
Genus	Species	Location	Stratigraphic position	Material	Notes	Image
Spoochelys	S. ormondea				perichelydian stem-turtle	
Chelidae Indet.	Indeterminate					

=== Mammals ===
==== Monotremes ====
Monotremes of the Griman Creek Formation
Genus	Species	Location	Stratigraphic position	Material	Notes	Image
Dharragarra	D. aurora			A partial left mandibular ramus.	A ornithorhynchid monotreme	
Kollikodon	K. ritchiei			An opalised dentary fragment, with one premolar and two molars in situ, as well as a referred maxillary fragment containing the last premolar and all four molars	A kollikodontid monotreme	
Opalios	O. splendens			A fragmentary left dentary.	A opalionid monotreme	
Parvopalus	P. clytiei			A partial left dentary.	A steropodontid monotreme	
Steropodon	S. galmani				A steropodontid monotreme	
Stirtodon	S. elizabethae			A large isolated premolars.	A teinolophid monotreme	

=== Lobe-finned Fish ===
Lobe-finned Fish of the Griman Creek Formation
Genus	Species	Location	Stratigraphic position	Material	Notes	Image
Ceratodus	C. diutinus			Isolated tooth plates	A ceratodontid lungfish	
Metaceratodus	M. wollastoni			Isolated tooth plates	A ceratodontid lunfish	
Neoceratodus	N. potkooroki			Isolated tooth plates	A neoceratodontid lungfish	

==== Ray-finned Fish ====
Ray-finned Fish of the Griman Creek Formation
Genus	Species	Location	Stratigraphic position	Material	Notes	Image
Calamopleurus?	C. sp.			Isolated jaw bones		

== See also ==
- List of dinosaur-bearing rock formations
- South Polar region of the Cretaceous
- Western Interior Seaway
- Cenomanian-Turonian extinction event
