= Opalios =

Opalios Temporal range: Late Cretaceous (Cenomanian), 100.2–96.6 Ma

Scientific classification
- Domain: Eukaryota
- Kingdom: Animalia
- Phylum: Chordata
- Class: Mammalia
- Order: Monotremata
- Superfamily: Ornithorhynchoidea
- Family: †Opalionidae; Flannery et al., 2024
- Genus: †Opalios; Flannery et al., 2024
- Species: †O. splendens

Binomial name
- †Opalios splendens Flannery et al., 2024

Genus of fossil montremes

Opalios (meaning "opal") is an extinct genus of monotreme mammal from the Late Cretaceous (Cenomanian) Griman Creek Formation of Australia. The genus contains a single species, O. splendens, known from a fragmentary left dentary.

== Discovery and naming ==
Opalios type locality near Lightning Ridge, Australia

The Opalios holotype specimen, AM F132596–AM F132599, was discovered in 2001 in sediments of the Griman Creek Formation (Wallangulla Sandstone Member) near Lightning Ridge, New South Wales, Australia. The specimen consists of four broken pieces of the left dentary.

In 2024, Flannery et al. described Opalios splendens as a new genus and species of early monotreme based on these fossil remains. They erected the new monotypic family Opalionidae within the Ornithorhynchoidea—the superfamily also containing modern echidnas and platypus—to house Opalios due to its similarity to both of these extant lineages. The generic name, Opalios, is a Greek word meaning "opal", referencing the holotype's opalized nature. The specific name, splendens, is a Latin word meaning "shining" or " distinguished", in reference to the holotype's striking translucency and size.

Opalios was nicknamed "echidnapus" (a portmanteau of "echidna" and "platypus") in the press following its description due to the specimen's similarities to both extant monotreme lineages.

Several other monotremes are known from the Griman Creek Formation, including Dharragarra and Parvopalus—which were described in the same publication as Opalios—as well as Kollikodon, Steropodon, and Stirtodon.
