= Parvopalus =

Parvopalus Temporal range: Late Cretaceous (Cenomanian), 100.2–96.6 Ma

Scientific classification
- Kingdom: Animalia
- Phylum: Chordata
- Clade: Synapsida
- Clade: Mammaliaformes
- Class: Mammalia
- Order: Monotremata
- Family: †Steropodontidae (?)
- Genus: †Parvopalus
- Species: †P. clytiei

Binomial name
- †Parvopalus clytiei Flannery et al., 2024

Genus of fossil montremes

Parvopalus (meaning "small opal") is an extinct genus of monotreme mammal from the Late Cretaceous (Cenomanian) Griman Creek Formation of Australia. The genus contains a single species, P. clytiei, known from a partial left dentary.

== Discovery and naming ==
Parvopalus type locality near Lightning Ridge, Australia

The Parvopalus holotype specimen, AM F161198, was discovered in 1999 in sediments of the Griman Creek Formation (Wallangulla Sandstone Member) near Lightning Ridge, New South Wales, Australia. The specimen consists of part of the left dentary.

In 2024, Flannery et al. described Parvopalus clytiei as a new genus and species of early monotreme based on these fossil remains. The generic name, Parvopalus, combines the Latin words "parvus", meaning "small", and "opalus", meaning "opal", referencing the opalized preservation style of the holotype. The specific name, clytiei, honours Clytie Smith who has found several opal fossils near the type locality.

Several other monotremes are known from the Griman Creek Formation, including Opalios and Dharragarra—which were described in the same publication as Parvopalus—as well as Kollikodon, Steropodon, and Stirtodon.
