= Stirtodon =

Stirtodon Temporal range: Late Cretaceous (Cenomanian), 100.2–96.6 Ma

Scientific classification
- Kingdom: Animalia
- Phylum: Chordata
- Class: Mammalia
- Order: Monotremata
- Family: †Teinolophidae (?)
- Genus: †Stirtodon
- Species: †S. elizabethae

Binomial name
- †Stirtodon elizabethae Flannery et al., 2020

Genus of fossil montremes

Stirtodon is an extinct genus of monotreme mammal from the Late Cretaceous (Cenomanian) Griman Creek Formation of Australia. The genus contains a single species, S. elizabethae, known from a large isolated premolar. Stirtodon may be the largest toothed monotreme discovered. Several other monotremes are known from the Griman Creek Formation, including Dharragarra, Kollikodon, Opalios, Parvopalus, and Steropodon.
