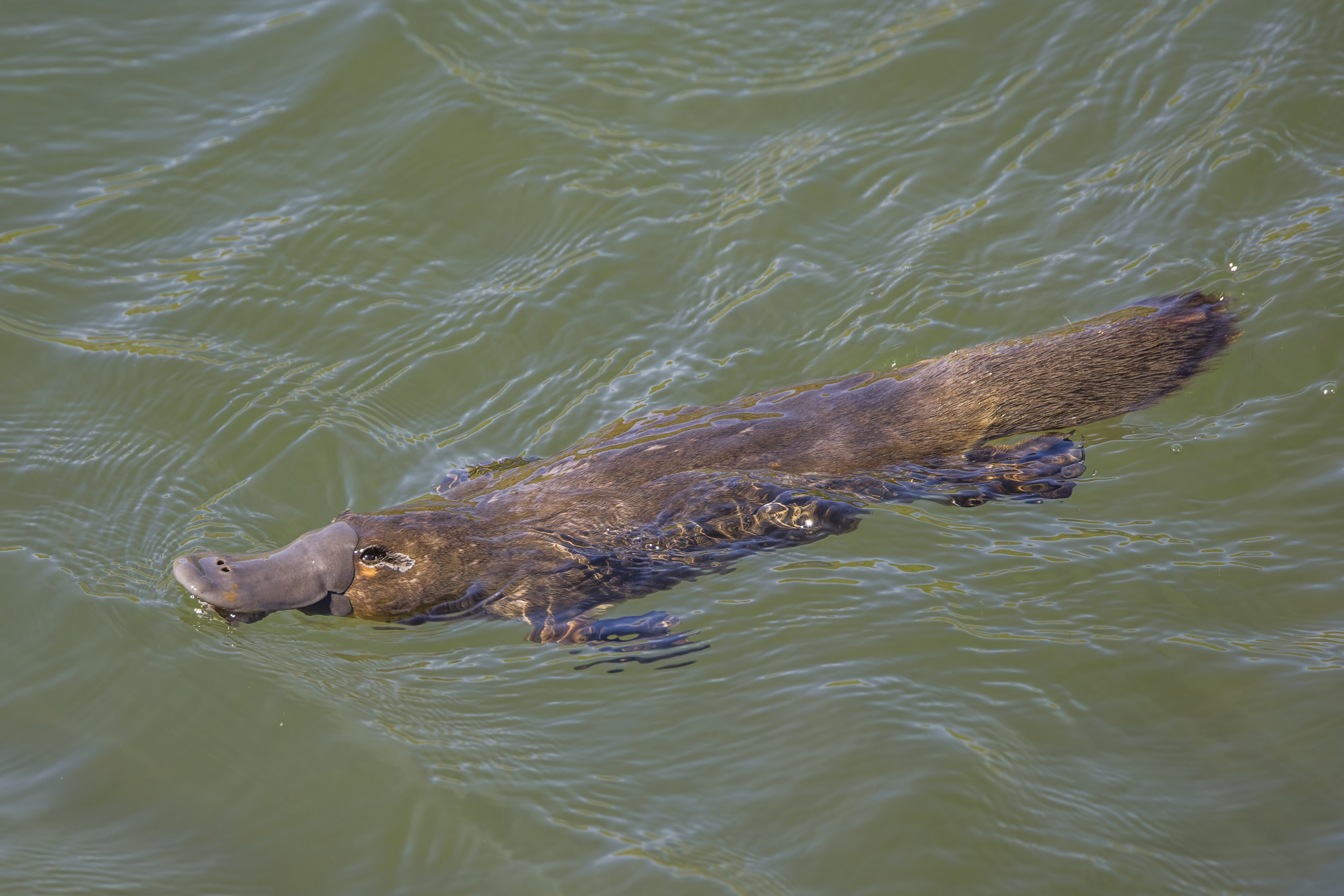
- Platypus swimming in waters near Scottsdale, Tasmania

Conservation status
- Near Threatened (IUCN 3.1)

Scientific classification
- Kingdom: Animalia
- Phylum: Chordata
- Class: Mammalia
- Order: Monotremata
- Family: Ornithorhynchidae
- Genus: Ornithorhynchus; Blumenbach, 1800
- Species: O. anatinus

Binomial name
- Ornithorhynchus anatinus (Shaw, 1799)
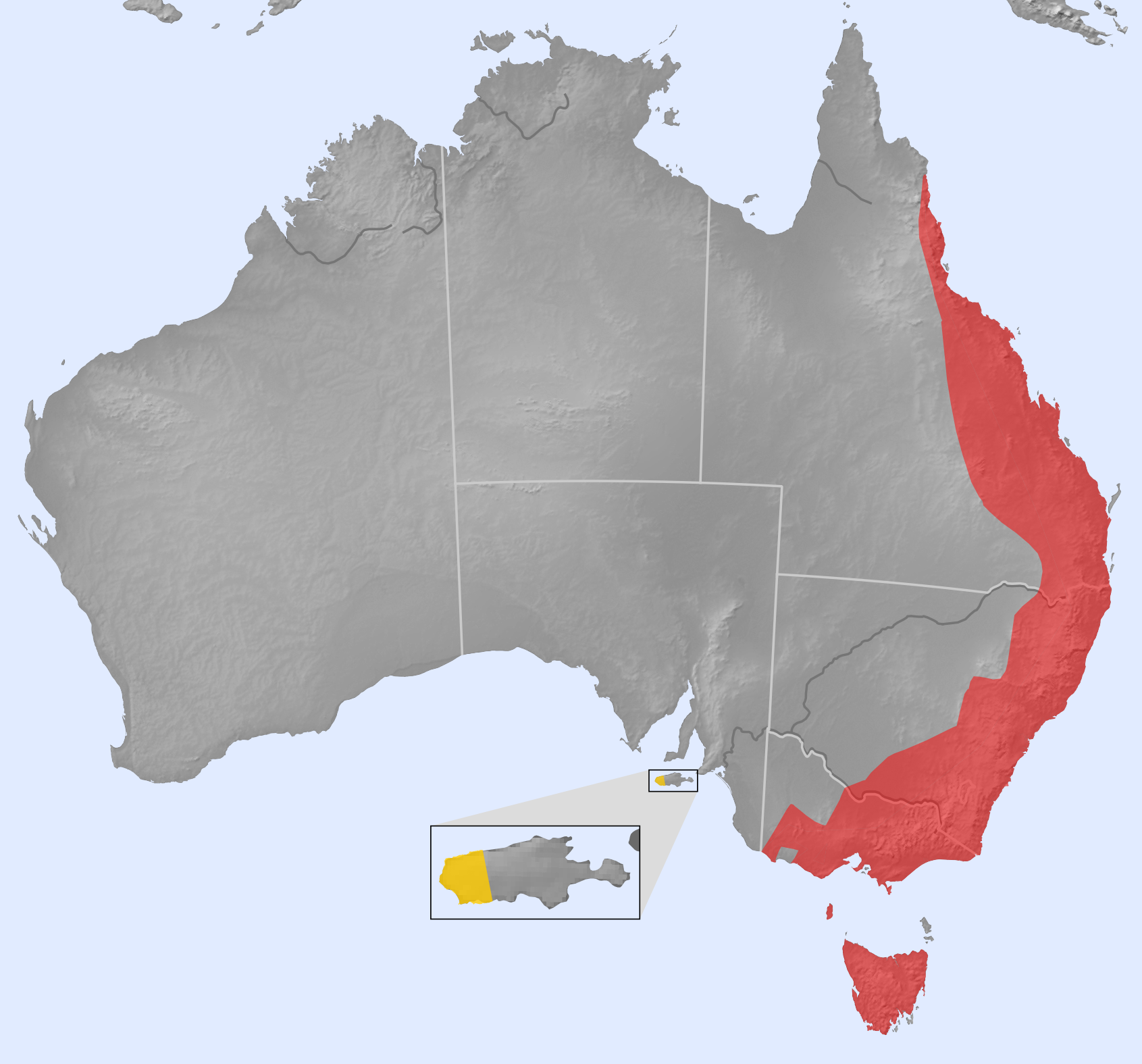
- Platypus range (red – native, yellow – introduced)

Synonyms
- Platypus anatinus Shaw, 1799; Ornithorhynchus paradoxus Blumenbach, 1800; O. novaehollandiae Lacépède, 1800; O. fuscus Péron, 1807; O. rufus Péron, 1807; O. paradoxi Meckel, 1826; O. crispus MacGillivray, 1827; O. laevis MacGillivray, 1827; O. brevirostris Ogilby, 1832; O. agilis de Vis, 1886; O. phoxinus O. Thomas, 1923; O. triton O. Thomas, 1923

= Platypus =

Platypus Temporal range: Pliocene–Recent

Species of mammal

The platypus (Ornithorhynchus anatinus), sometimes referred to as the duck-billed platypus, is a semiaquatic, egg-laying mammal endemic to eastern Australia, including Tasmania. The platypus is the sole living representative of the family Ornithorhynchidae and genus Ornithorhynchus, though a number of related species appear in the fossil record. Together with the four species of echidna, it is one of the five extant species of monotremes, mammals that lay eggs instead of giving birth to live young. Like other monotremes, the platypus has a sense of electrolocation, which it uses to detect prey in water while its eyes, ears and nostrils are closed. It is one of the few species of venomous mammals, as the male platypus has a spur on each hind foot that delivers an extremely painful venom.

The unusual appearance of this egg-laying, duck-billed, beaver-tailed mammal at first baffled European naturalists. In 1799, the first scientists to examine a preserved platypus body judged it a fake made of several animals sewn together. The unique features of the platypus make it important in the study of evolutionary biology, and a recognisable and iconic symbol of Australia. It is culturally significant to several Aboriginal peoples, who also used to hunt it for food, and has appeared on stamps and currency.

The platypus was hunted for its fur, but since 1912 it has been a legally protected species in all states where it is found. Captive breeding programs have had slight success, and it is vulnerable to pollution, bycatching and climate change. It is classified as a near-threatened species by the IUCN, but a November 2020 report has recommended that it be upgraded to threatened species under the federal EPBC Act, due to habitat destruction and declining numbers in all states.

== Taxonomy and naming ==
Australian Aboriginal people have referred to the platypus in various ways depending on Australian indigenous languages and dialects. Among the names found: boondaburra, mallingong, tambreet, watjarang (names in Yass, Murrumbidgee, and Tumut), tohunbuck (region of Goomburra, Darling Downs), dulaiwarrung or dulai warrung (Woiwurrung language, Wurundjeri, Victoria), djanbang (Bundjalung, Queensland), djumulung (Yuin language, Yuin, New South Wales), maluŋgaŋ (ngunnawal language, Ngunnawal, Australian Capital Territory), biladurang, wamul, dyiimalung, oornie, dungidany (Wiradjuri language, Wiradjuri, Victoria, New South Wales), oonah, etc. The name chosen and approved in Palawa kani (reconstructed Tasmanian language) is larila.

When the platypus was first encountered by Europeans in 1798, a pelt and sketch were sent back to Great Britain by Captain John Hunter, the second Governor of New South Wales. British scientists' initial hunch was that the attributes were a hoax. George Shaw, who produced the first description of the animal in the Naturalist's Miscellany in 1799, stated it was impossible not to entertain doubts as to its genuine nature, and Robert Knox believed—because it arrived in England via the Indian Ocean—that it might have been created by Chinese sailors. It was thought somebody had sewn a duck's beak onto the body of a beaver-like animal. Shaw used a pair of scissors to check for stitches.

The common name "platypus" means 'flat-foot', deriving from the Greek word platúpous (πλατύπους), from platús (πλατύς 'broad, wide, flat') (Note: The same root gives rise to platysma, a broad, wide and flat muscle of the neck.) and poús (πούς 'foot'). Shaw initially assigned the species the Linnaean name Platypus anatinus when he described it, but the genus term was quickly discovered to already be in use as the name of a beetle genus Platypus. It was independently described as Ornithorhynchus paradoxus by Johann Blumenbach in 1800 (from a specimen given to him by Sir Joseph Banks) and following the rules of priority of nomenclature, it was later officially recognised as Ornithorhynchus anatinus.

Various dictionaries list "platypuses" or simply "platypus" as the plural. Alternatively, the term "platypi" is also used for the plural, although this is a form of pseudo-Latin; going by the word's Greek roots the plural would be "platypodes". Early European settlers called it by many names, such as "watermole", "duckbill", and "duckmole". Occasionally it is specifically called the "duck-billed platypus". There is no official term for platypus young, but the term "platypup" sees unofficial use, as does "puggle".

The scientific name Ornithorhynchus anatinus literally means 'duck-like bird-snout', deriving its genus name from the Greek root ornith- (όρνιθ ornith or ὄρνις órnīs 'bird') and the word rhúnkhos (ῥύγχος 'snout', 'beak'). Its species name is derived from Latin anatinus ('duck-like') from anas 'duck'. The platypus is the sole living representative or monotypic taxon of its family (Ornithorhynchidae).

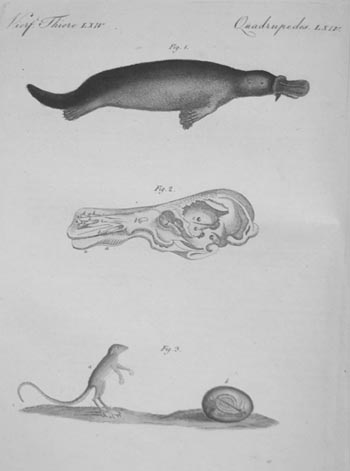
A book for children published in Germany in 1798

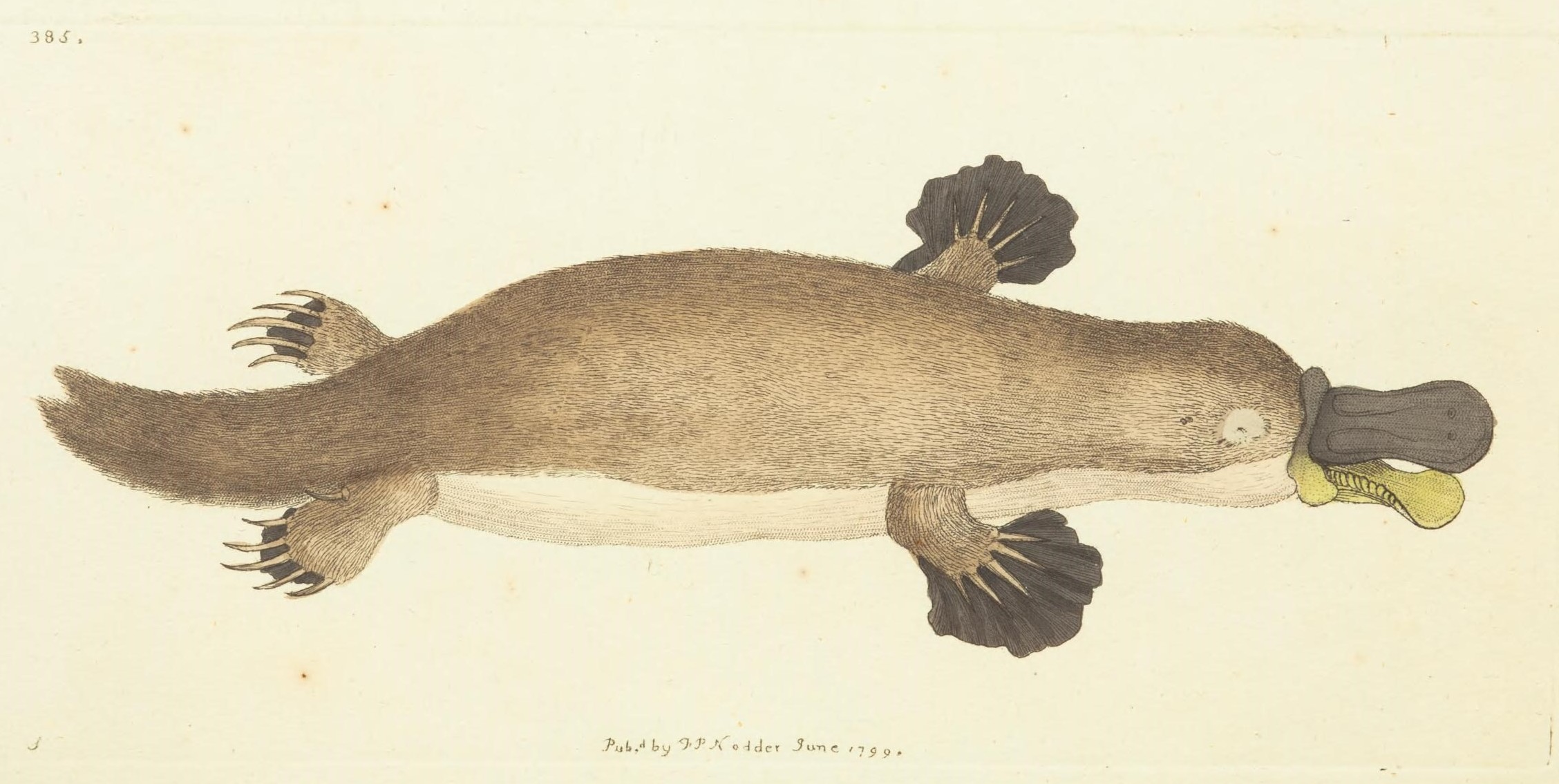
Illustration from the first scientific description in 1799

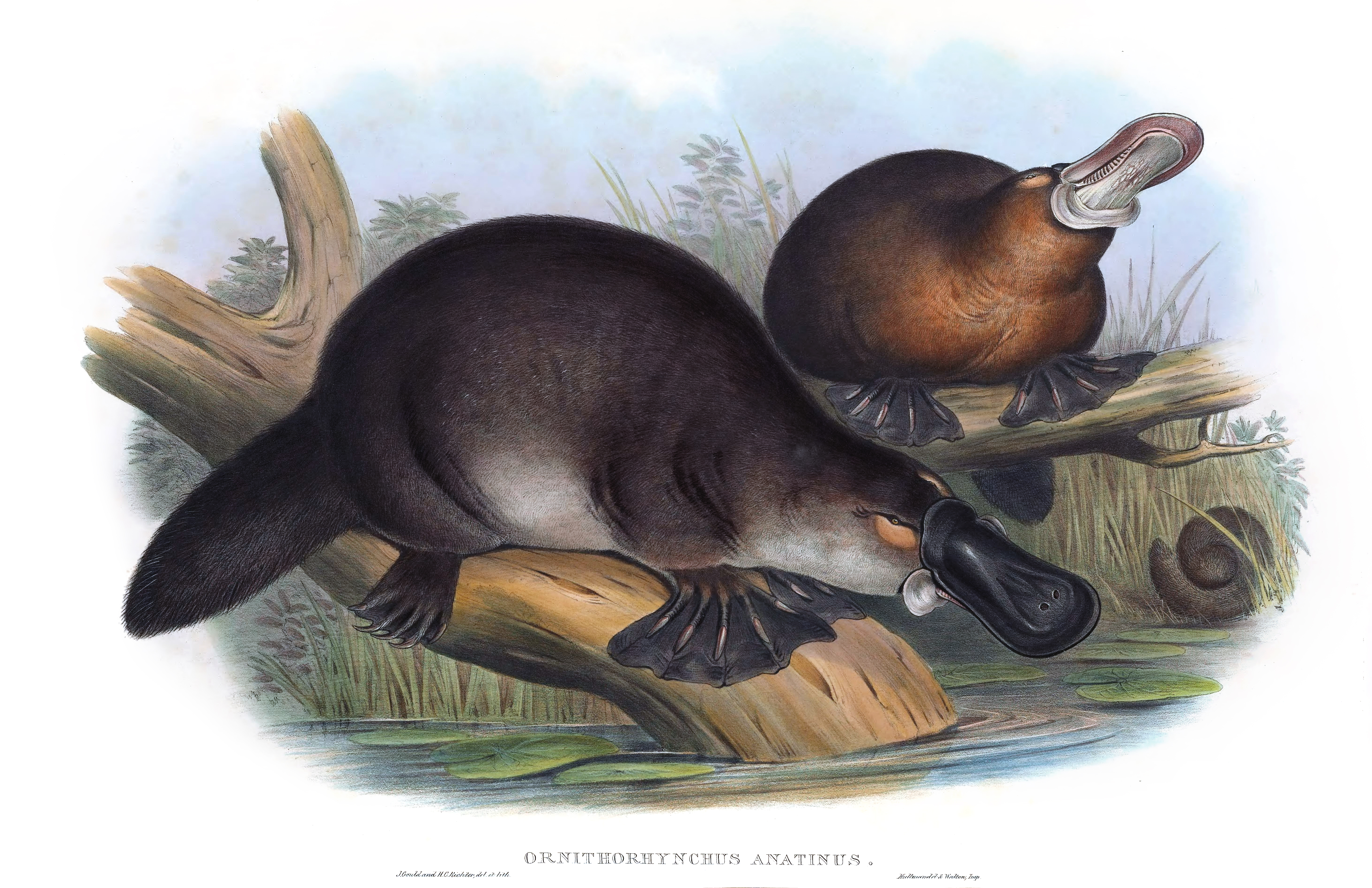
Colour print from 1863

== Description ==
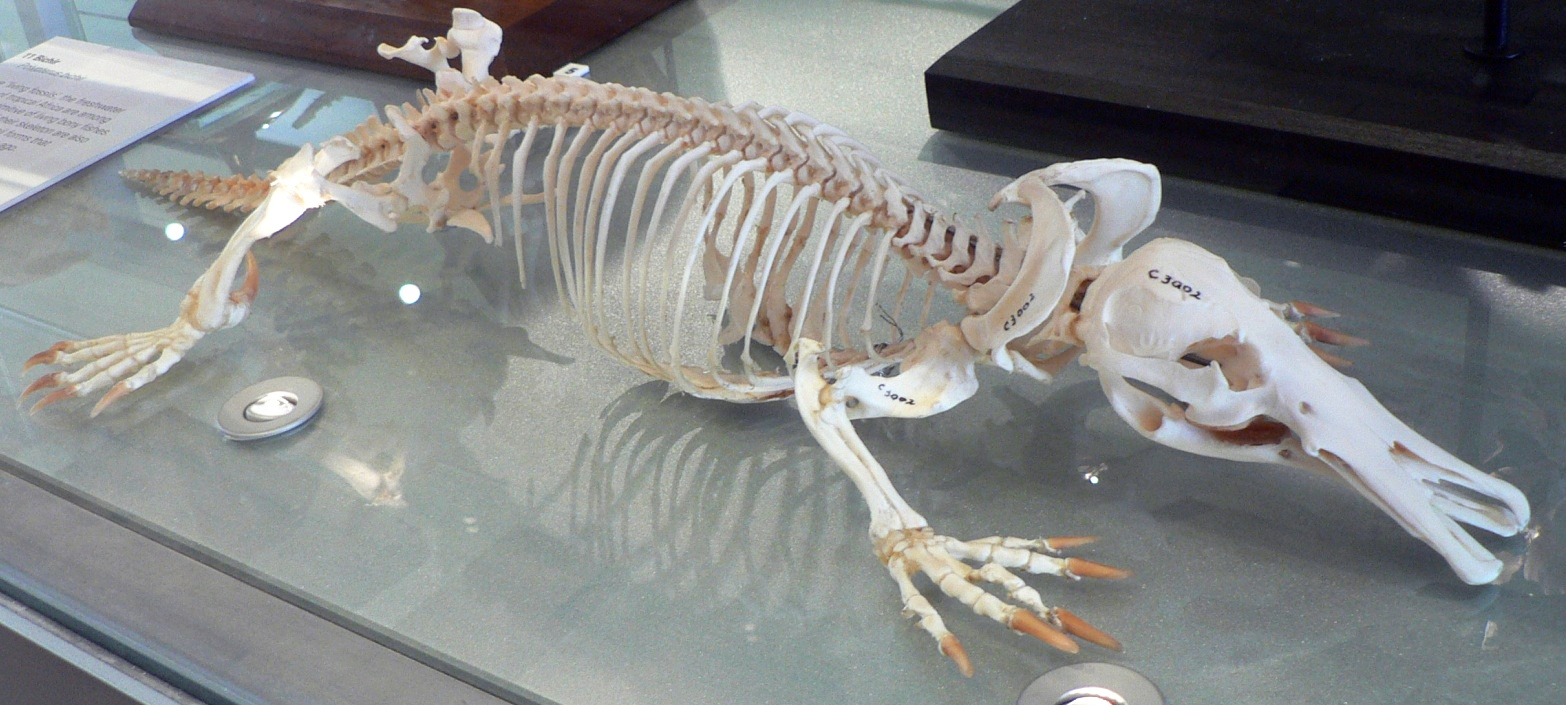
Platypus skeleton

Most of the platypus' small streamlined body is covered with short, dense, brown fur that traps a layer of insulating air to keep the animal warm, both in and out of water. The fur coat is waterproof and consists of flattened guard hairs and curvy underfur hairs. It is one of the most densely furred mammals, behind only otters. It is also biofluorescent and glows cyan and green when under ultraviolet light; this may serve to camouflage it in low lighting from UV-sensitive predators. It is also unique among mammal in having hair pigmentation melanosomes that are hollow. The duck-like bill consists of a long snout and lower jaw which is covered in soft skin. The nostrils are located near the tip of the snout's dorsal surface, while the eyes and ears are just behind the snout in a groove which closes underwater. A unique bone, the os paradoxum, is present in the bill; developmentally, it represents a portion of the premaxillae that becomes separated during development. It has cheek pouches for storing food. The platypus's wide, flat tail is compared to a beaver's but is furry rather than scaly; it stores fat reserves and can act as a rudder during swimming. The legs are short and have a sprawling stance. Webbing is more significant on the front feet. While walking on land, the feet are folded up in knuckle-walking to protect the webbing.

The platypus has an interclavicle in the shoulder girdle, a trait which they share with reptiles. As in many other aquatic and semiaquatic vertebrates, the bones show osteosclerosis, increasing their density to reduce buoyancy. Adult platypuses lack teeth and instead have heavily keratinised food-grinding pads. Young platypuses have one premolar tooth and two molars on each maxillae, and three molars on the dentaries. The first upper and third lower cheek teeth have only one major cusp, while the rest have two. They lose their teeth around the time they leave their natal burrow.

The platypus lacks a functional stomach, due to the lack of genes necessary for creating and secreting pepsin proteases. However, the platypus's digestive tract has a pouch-like section that assists with nutrient absorption in the intestines.

Male platypuses have an average length of 50 cm (20 in) and weight of 1,700 g (3.7 lb), while females are smaller with an average length of 43 cm (17 in) and weight of 900 g (2.0 lb). The species follows Bergmann's rule, with individuals being larger the farther south they are, due to colder climates; there are local variations, however. The platypus has an average body temperature of about 32 °C (90 °F), lower than the 37 °C (99 °F) typical of placental mammals. Research suggests this has been a gradual adaptation to harsh environmental conditions among the few marginal surviving monotreme species, rather than a general characteristic of past monotremes.

The platypus has a single opening, called a cloaca, for both the reproductive and waste systems. The male platypus has penile spines and an asymmetrical glans penis that is larger on the left side. The female has two ovaries, with the right one being non-functional, and teats are absent.

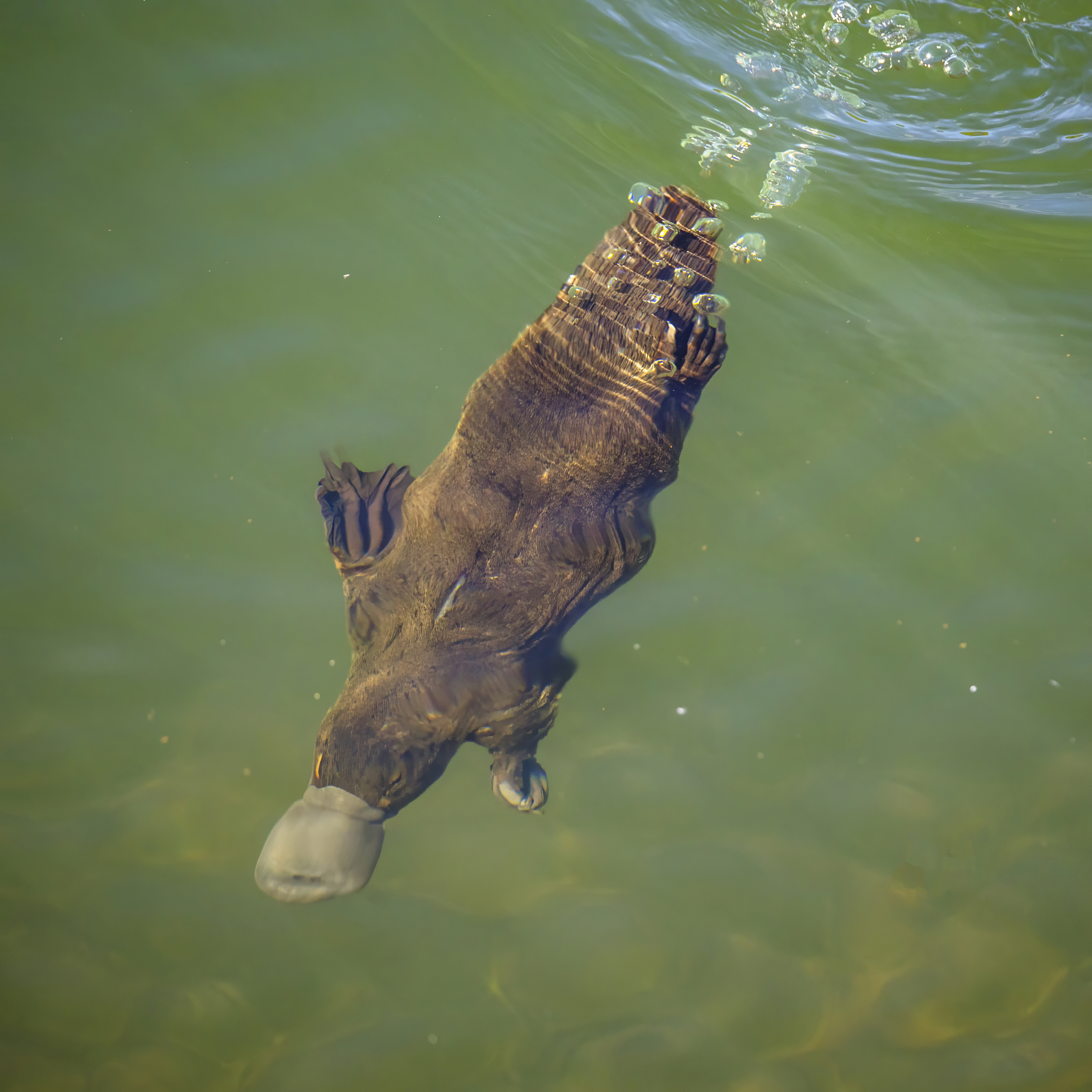
Diving

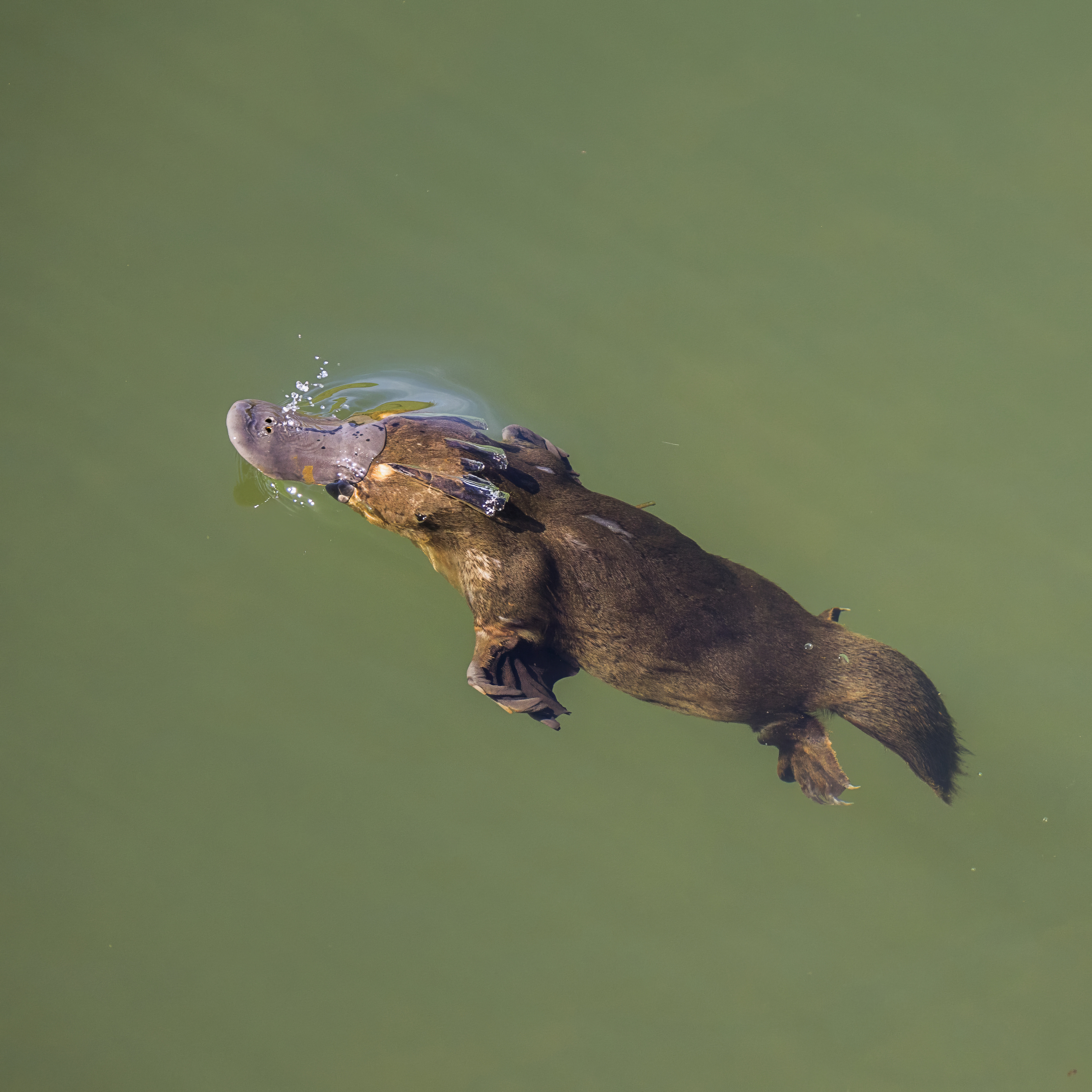
Surfacing

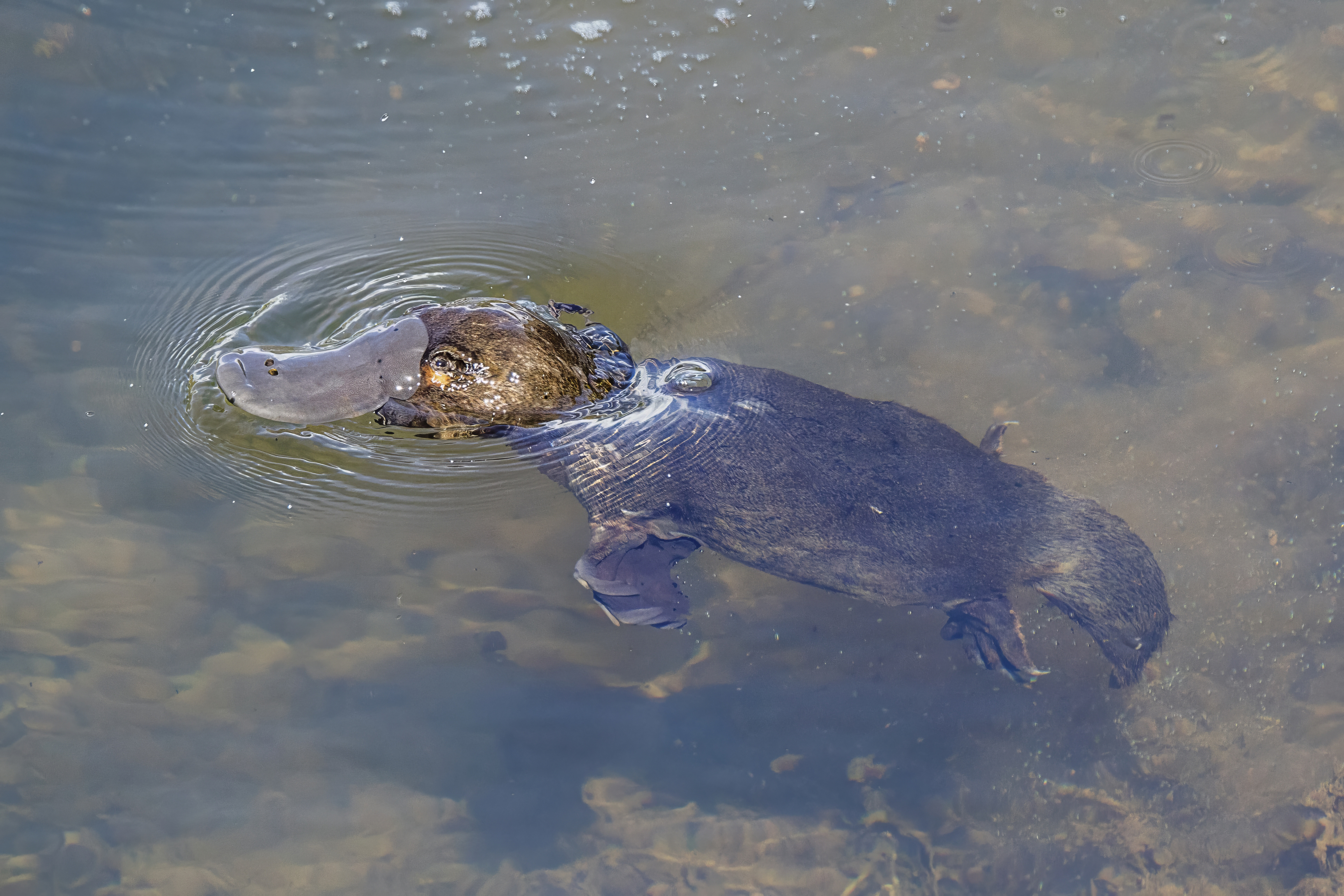

=== Senses ===
The platypus has secondarily acquired electroreception. Its receptors are arranged in stripes on its bill, giving it high sensitivity to the sides and below; it makes quick turns of its head as it swims to detect prey.

Monotremes are the only mammals (apart from the Guiana dolphin) known to have a sense of electroreception. The platypus relies on electrolocation when feeding, as the eyes, ears, and nose are closed while underwater. Digging in the bottom of streams with its bill, its electroreceptors detect tiny electric currents generated by the muscular contractions of its prey. Experiments have shown the platypus will even react to an "artificial shrimp" if a small electric current is passed through it.

The 40,000 electroreceptors are arranged in rows in the skin of the bill from front to back, while mechanoreceptors for touch are uniformly distributed across the bill. The electrosensory area of the cerebral cortex is in the tactile somatosensory area, and some cortical cells receive input from both electroreceptors and mechanoreceptors, suggesting the platypus feels electric fields as touches. These receptors in the bill dominate the somatotopic map of the platypus brain, in the same way human hands dominate the Penfield homunculus map. The platypus can feel the direction of an electric source, perhaps by comparing differences in signal strength across the array of electroreceptors, enhanced by the characteristic side-to-side motion of the animal's head while hunting. It may also be able to determine the distance of moving prey via the timing difference between electrical and mechanical pressure sensations. Monotreme electrolocation for hunting in murky waters may be tied to their tooth loss. The extinct Obdurodon was electroreceptive, but unlike the modern platypus it foraged in open water.

The eyes of the platypus have basal traits also found in lungfish and amphibians, such as scleral cartilage, double cones, and droplets. The platypus's eyes are small and shut under water, though several features indicate its ancestors relied on vision. As with other aquatic mammals, the eye has a flattened cornea and surrounding lens, while the posterior surface of the lens is sharply inclined. A temporal (ear side) concentration of retinal ganglion cells, important for binocular vision, indicates a vestigial role in predation, though the actual visual acuity is insufficient for such activities. Limited acuity is matched by low cortical magnification, a small lateral geniculate nucleus, and a large optic tectum, suggesting that the visual midbrain plays a more important role than the visual cortex, as in some rodents. These features suggest that the platypus has adapted to an aquatic and nocturnal lifestyle, developing its electrosensory system at the cost of its visual system. This contrasts with the small number of electroreceptors in the short-beaked echidna, which dwells in dry environments, while the long-beaked echidna, which lives in wetter habitats is intermediate between the other two monotremes.

The ears of the platypus are adapted for hearing while out of water. As in all true mammals, it has three middle ear bones, though the cochlea lacks spirals, but is described as "well organised". Within the cochlea, there are rows of inner and outer hair cells. As in placental mammals, the outer hair cells of the platypus are adapted for hearing high frequencies, suggesting it is an ancestral mammalian trait. However it also possesses more rows of inner hair cells. The olfactory (smelling) systems of the platypus and the echidna independently evolved from an ancestor with less advanced smelling. The main olfactory bulb of the platypus lacks the complex layers of the echidna, while both the piriform cortex and flaps (lamella) are simpler. Monotremes differ from placental mammals in that their mitral cells are distributed throughout the outer plexiform layer of the olfactory bulb rather than packed as a monolayer.

=== Venom ===
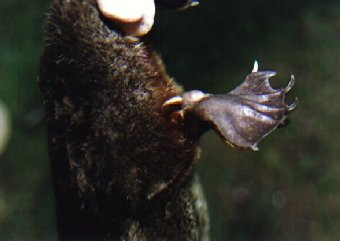
The calcaneus spur on the male's hind limb is used to inject venom.

Male platypuses are born with back ankle spurs. Females are born with a vestigial spur sheath, but lose these as they mature. Similar spurs are found on many archaic mammal groups, indicating that this was an ancient general characteristic among mammals. The spurs of the male inject venom, which is powerful enough to inflict pain in humans. Starting from the wounded area, the affected limb develops edema (swelling via fluid buildup) which can lead to an excruciating hyperalgesia (heightened sensitivity to pain) that can last as long as months.

The venom is composed largely of defensin-like proteins (DLPs) produced by the immune system, some of which are unique to the species. It is produced in kidney-shaped alveolar glands located in each of the thighs of the hind limbs and connected to the spur. The venomous spurs of male platypuses serve as weapons in battles with other males for breeding.

== Distribution and habitat ==
The platypus is native to the freshwaters of eastern Australia, from Queensland to Tasmania (including King Island but not the Furneaux Group). It was believed to be extinct on the South Australian mainland, with the last sighting recorded at Renmark in 1975. Platypuses were captively bred at Warrawong Sanctuary in 1990-91. In October 2020 a nesting platypus was filmed in the wild after the previously abandoned Sanctuary reopened. There is a population on Kangaroo Island introduced in the 1920s, said to stand at 150 individuals in the Rocky River region of Flinders Chase National Park. In the 2019–20 Australian bushfire season, large portions of the island burned, decimating wildlife. However, SA Department for Environment and Water recovery teams worked to restore their habitat, with a number of sightings reported by April 2020. The platypus has almost disappeared from the Murray–Darling Basin, possibly due to poor water management. Platypuses can be found in a variety of freshwater habitats including rivers, streams, lakes and lagoon-like pools. The surrounding terrestrial environment includes tropical rainforests and colder alpine areas.

== Ecology and behaviour ==
Swimming underwater at Sydney Aquarium, Australia

The platypus is semiaquatic and requires permanent freshwater habitat. Its swimming style is unique among mammals, propelling itself by alternating strokes of each front foot, while the webbed hind feet and tail are used for steering. It can maintain its relatively low body temperature when feeding in colder depths of below 5 °C (41 °F). In one study, dives lasted on average thirty-five seconds, with surfacing intervals averaging thirteen seconds. The species is mainly nocturnal but is also active at dusk during the summer and daytime during winter. A platypus may spend half the day in water and then retreat into its burrow, which is constructed by digging into the bank. These vary between simple resting banks and complex nesting/breeding burrows. It may have a range of up to 7 km (4.3 mi), with a male's home range overlapping those of three or four females. Platypuses are not very vocal; they have been recorded to growl when disturbed and squeak when feeling pain.

The platypus is a carnivore and forages by probing along the bottom. It feeds on insect larvae, annelid worms, shrimp, crayfish, bivalves, tadpoles and fish eggs. It stores food in its cheek pouches for later consumption. In captivity, platypuses have survived up to thirty years, and wild specimens have been recaptured at twenty-four years old. They are preyed upon by goannas, Murray cod, carpet snakes, eagles, saltwater crocodiles, red foxes, and possibly eels. Parasites and viruses also affect their mortality, though platypuses appear to have a high tolerance for them. Externally, platypuses may carry fleas, mites, and ticks, the latter being more prominent in young. The platypus is a common host for the tick species Ixodes ornithorhynchi. Internally, the platypus may host protozoans, trematodes, and nematodes. The fungus Mucor amphibiorum has been reported in Tasmanian platypuses, which causes the disease mucormycosis, symptoms of which include skin lesions and ulcers along the body.

=== Reproduction ===
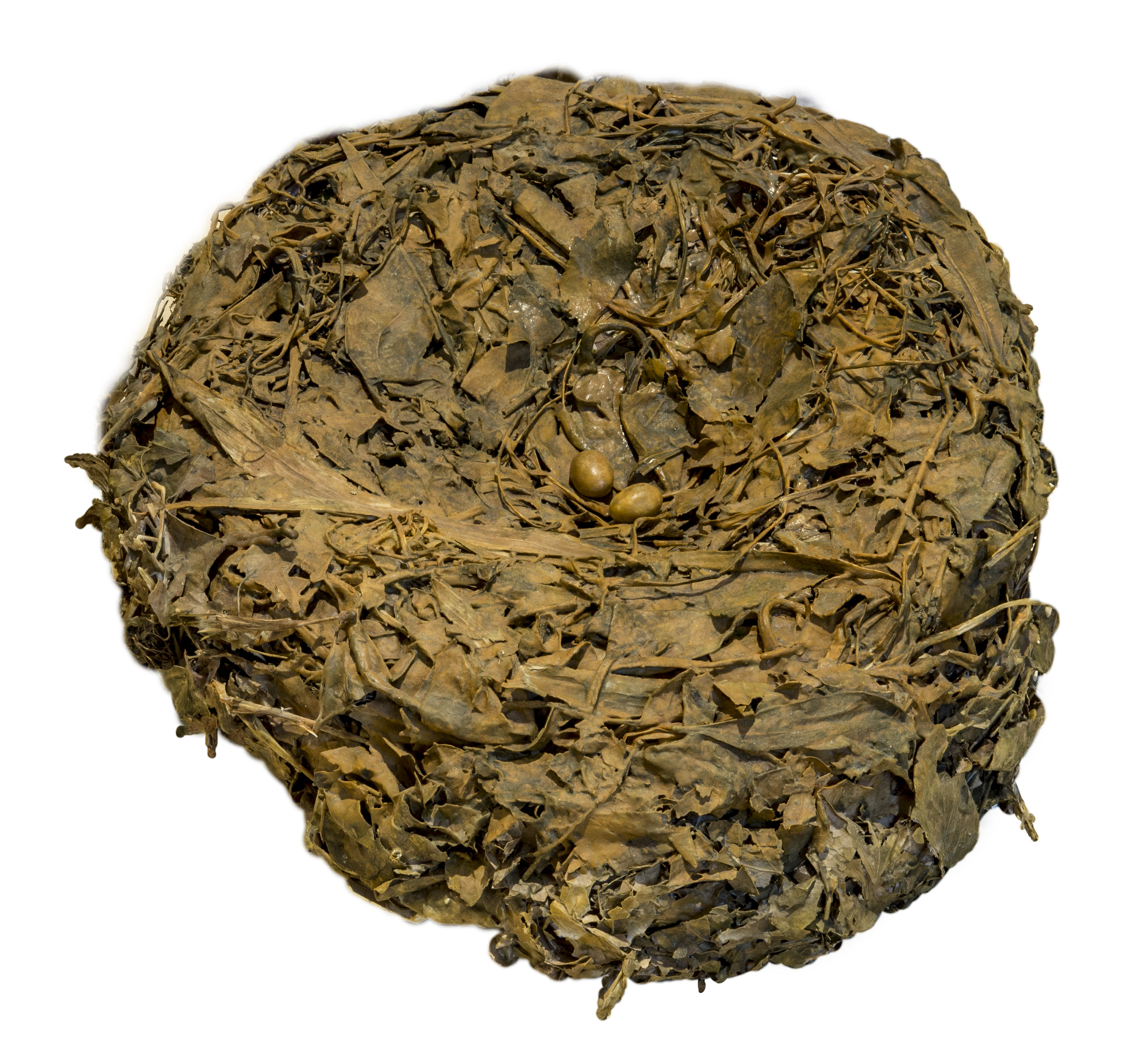
Platypus's nest with eggs (replica)

Platypuses are seasonal breeders, with the more southerly populations breeding later in the year than those further north; those in New South Wales mate during fall and winter. Research has found both resident and transient platypuses, and suggest a polygynous mating system. Females are believed to become sexually mature at two years of age and continue to breed beyond nine years. During copulation, the male swims behind the female and grabs the tail with his bill, positioning his own tail under her from the side, then grips her neck or shoulder. The female retreats into a nesting/breeding burrow made of grass, which can be 30 m (98 ft) long, to lay eggs and raise young. Early European naturalists did not believe that the female platypus lays eggs, but this was confirmed by William Hay Caldwell in 1884.

Most mammal zygotes go through holoblastic cleavage, splitting into several divisible daughter cells. However, monotremes such as the platypus, along with reptiles and birds, undergo meroblastic cleavage, in which the ovum does not split completely. The cells at the edge of the yolk remain continuous with the egg's cytoplasm, allowing the yolk and embryo to exchange waste and nutrients with the egg through the cytoplasm. The female normally lays two small, leathery eggs about 17 mm (21/32 in) long. The eggs develop in utero for about twenty-eight days, followed by a ten day external incubation. The female curls around the incubating eggs, as the embryo continues to develop. Newly hatched platypuses are vulnerable; blind and hairless, they are fed by the mother's milk, which is thicker than in placental mammals and provides all the requirements for growth and development. With no teats, the milk is released through pores in the skin from which the young lap it up in her fur. The offspring are milk-fed for around four months; a minority of young are weaned after they exit the burrow but usually within five days. Hatched young also have a remnant yolk sac which disappears within four days.

During incubation and weaning, the mother initially leaves the burrow only for short periods to forage. She leaves behind her a number of thin soil plugs along the length of the burrow; pushing past these on her return squeezes water from her fur and allows the burrow to remain dry. The female spends less time with her offspring after five weeks, who emerge from the burrow around four months. By then, they are fully covered in fur and may be around 67% the weight of an adult and 80% the length. Juvenile males disperse further than females. They are fully grown at around two years.

== Evolution ==
- - - Platypus
    - Echidnas
  - live birth
    - Marsupials
    - true placenta
      Placentals

Evolutionary relationships between the platypus and other mammals

In separate publications in 1934, 1947, and 1951, William King Gregory theorised that placental mammals and marsupials may have diverged earlier, and a subsequent branching divided the monotremes and marsupials. Later research and fossil discoveries have suggested this is incorrect. Modern monotremes are the survivors of an early branching of the mammal tree, and a later branching is thought to have led to the marsupial and placental groups. Both molecular clock and fossil dating suggest that the platypus split from echidnas around 19–48 million years ago.

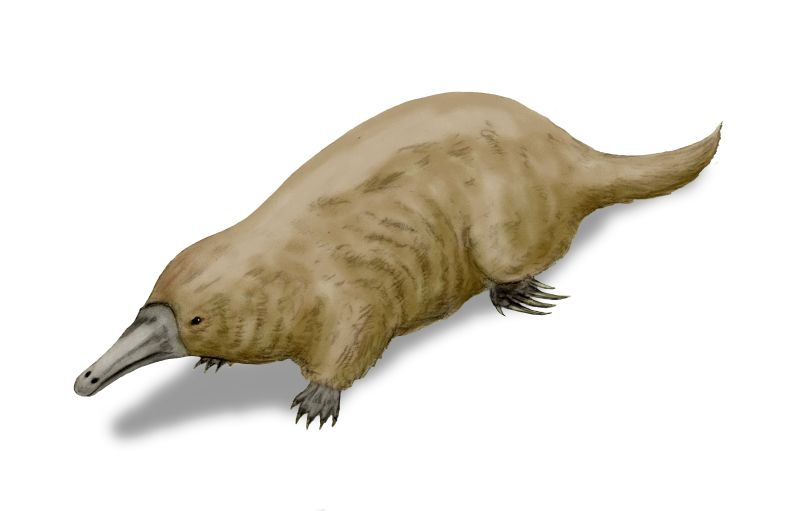
Reconstruction of ancient platypus relative Steropodon

The oldest discovered fossil of the modern platypus dates back to about 100,000 years ago during the Quaternary period, though a limb bone of Ornithorhynchus is known from Pliocene-epoch strata. The extinct monotremes Teinolophos, Steropodon and Kollikodon from the Cretaceous period are considered to be basal to the platypus and echidnas. The remains of Steropodon were discovered in New South Wales, composed of an opalised lower jawbone with three molar teeth (whereas the adult contemporary platypus is toothless). The molar teeth were initially thought to be tribosphenic, which would have supported a variation of Gregory's theory, but later research has suggested that, while they have three cusps, they evolved under a separate process. The fossil jaw of Teinolophos is elongated but unlike the modern platypus (and echidnas), lacks a beak.

In 2024, Late Cretaceous (Cenomanian)-aged fossil specimens of early platypus relatives were recovered from the same rocks as Steropodon, including the basal Opalios and the more derived Dharragarra, the latter of which may be the oldest member of the platypus family Ornithorhynchidae, as it retains the same dental formula found in Cenozoic platypus relatives. Monotrematum and Patagorhynchus, also fossil relatives of the platypus, are known from the latest Cretaceous (Maastrichtian) and the mid-Paleocene of Argentina, indicating that some monotremes managed to colonize South America from Australia when the two continents were connected via Antarctica. These are also considered potential members of the platypus Ornithorhynchidae. The closest fossil relative of the platypus is Obdurodon, known from the late Oligocene to the Miocene of Australia. It closely resembled the modern platypus, aside from the presence of molar teeth. A fossilised tooth of the giant platypus Obdurodon tharalkooschild was dated 5–15 million years ago. Judging by the tooth, the animal measured 1.3 metres long, making it the largest platypus known.

The loss of teeth in the modern platypus has long been enigmatic, as a distinctive lower molar tooth row was present in its lineage for over 95 million years. Even its closest relative, Obdurodon, which otherwise closely resembles the platypus, retained this tooth row. More recent studies indicate that this tooth loss was geologically a very recent event, occurring only around the Plio-Pleistocene about 2.5 million years ago, when the rakali, a large semiaquatic rodent, colonized Australia from New Guinea. The platypus, which previously fed on a wide array of hard and soft-bodied prey, was outcompeted by the rakali for hard-bodied prey such as crayfish and mussels. This competition may have selected for the loss of teeth in the platypus and their replacement by horny pads, as a way of specializing for softer-bodied prey, over which the rakali did not compete.

=== Genome ===
Because of the early divergence from the therian mammals and the low numbers of extant monotreme species, the platypus is a frequent subject of research in evolutionary biology. In 2004, researchers at the Australian National University discovered that the platypus has ten sex chromosomes, compared with two (XY) in most other mammals. These ten chromosomes form five unique pairs of XY in males and XX in females, i.e. males are X_{1}Y_{1}X_{2}Y_{2}X_{3}Y_{3}X_{4}Y_{4}X_{5}Y_{5}. One of the X chromosomes of the platypus has close homology to the bird Z chromosome. The platypus genome also has both reptilian and mammalian genes associated with egg fertilisation. Though the platypus lacks the mammalian sex-determining gene SRY, a study found that the mechanism of sex determination is the AMH gene on the oldest Y chromosome. A draft version of the platypus genome sequence was published in Nature in May 2008, revealing both reptilian and mammalian elements, as well as two genes previously found only in non-mammalian vertebrates. More than 80% of the platypus's genes exist in other amniotes whose genomes have been compared. An updated genome, the most complete on record, was published in 2021, together with the genome of the short-beaked echidna.

== Conservation ==
The International Union for Conservation of Nature categorised the platypus as "near threatened" in 2016, based on estimates that numbers had fallen by about thirty percent on average since European settlement. Other biologists have shown concern that the estimates of the 2016 baseline numbers could be wrong, and numbers may have been reduced by as much as fifty percent. The species was hunted for its fur until the early years of the 20th century. Although the species gained legal protections beginning in Victoria in 1890 and throughout Australia by 1912, it continues to drown in the nets of inland fisheries. The use of "opera house traps" by recreational fishers for catching yabbies is banned in the ACT, South Australia, Tasmania and Victoria, and restricted in NSW and Queensland, due to the traps drowning non-targeted species including platypuses. The platypus was listed as endangered is South Australia, under the National Parks and Wildlife Act 1972. In November 2020 a recommendation was made to list the platypus as a vulnerable species across all states. In January 2021, Victoria officially adopted the vulnerable species designation, under the state's Flora and Fauna Guarantee Act 1988. The platypus is not covered under the federal EPBC Act.

The platypus continues to be adversely affected by habitat disruption caused by dams, pollution, urban expansion, and urban runoff. Droughts and the demands for water for human use are also considered threats. In January 2020, researchers from the University of New South Wales presented evidence that the platypus is at risk of extinction, due to factors such as water extraction, land clearing, climate change, and invasive species. The study predicted that, considering current threats, the animals' abundance would drop by 47–66% and metapopulation occupancy by 22–32% over fifty years, causing "extinction of local populations across about 40% of the range". Using climate change projections to 2070, reduced habitat due to drought would lead to 51–73% lower abundance and 36–56% lower metapopulation occupancy after at least fifty years. These predictions suggested that the species would fall under the "Vulnerable" classification. The authors stressed the need for national conservation efforts to ensure healthy platypus habitat, which may include conducting more surveys and tracking trends, as well as better river management while reducing threats.

A November 2020 report by scientists from the University of New South Wales, funded by a research grant from the Australian Conservation Foundation in collaboration with the World Wildlife Fund Australia and the Humane Society International Australia revealed that over the past thirty years platypus habitat in Australia has dropped by 22%, and supported listing the platypus as a threatened species under the EPBC Act, as the declines have been mostly in the Murray–Darling basin and NSW in general.

=== Sanctuaries and captivity ===
Few platypuses have been successfully raised and bred by humans. One notable example is at Healesville Sanctuary in Victoria under David Fleay, where breeding was successful in 1943. More platypuses were successfully bred and raised in 1998 and again in 2000 using a stream tank. Between 2008 and 2012, platypuses were bred regularly at Healesville, including twins. In 1990-91, there was successful breeding of platypuses at Warrawong Sanctuary. Taronga Zoo in Sydney bred twins in 2003, and the facility has since bred more platypuses to be released into the wild in NSW. As of 2019, the only platypuses in captivity outside of Australia are in the San Diego Zoo Safari Park in the U.S. state of California. Three platypuses were given to the Bronx Zoo in 1947, two females and a male. One of the females; Penelope had a false proto-pregnancy.

== Human interactions ==
=== Usage ===
Aboriginal Australians hunted and ate platypuses, particularly for their fatty nutritious tails, while, after colonisation, Europeans killed them for fur from the late 19th century until 1912, when it was prohibited by law. In addition, European researchers captured and killed platypus or removed their eggs, partly in order to increase scientific knowledge, but also to gain prestige and outcompete rivals from different countries. During the Second World War, in spite of an export ban, Australia gave live platypuses as diplomatic gifts to Allied nations as part of an initiative to increase military assistance. One of which was intended as a gift to Winston Churchill died while en route as a result of either erratic temperature changes, malnourishment, or shock from depth charges deployed after a U-boat harassed the ship.

=== Cultural references ===
The platypus has been a subject in the Dreamtime stories of Aboriginal Australians, some of whom believed the animal was a hybrid of a duck and a water rat. Aboriginals from the upper Darling River region have a story of a large water-rat called Biggoon who kidnaps a duck what wandered too far from its tribe. After managing to escape, she returned and laid two eggs which hatched the first platypuses. They were all exiled and went to live in the mountains. In another story from the upper Darling, the major animal groups, the land animals, water animals and birds, all competed for the platypus to join their respective groups, but the platypus ultimately decided to not join any of them, feeling that he did not need to be part of a group to be special, and wished to remain friends with all of those groups.

The platypus is also featured as a totem for some Aboriginal peoples, which is to them "a natural object, plant or animal that is inherited by members of a clan or family as their spiritual emblem", and the animal holds special meaning for the Wadi Wadi people at the Murray River. Because of their cultural significance and importance in connection to country, the platypus is protected and conserved by these Indigenous peoples. The platypus has often represented Australia's cultural identity and its image has also been used for stamps and currency and as a mascot in the 2000 Summer Olympics in Sydney.

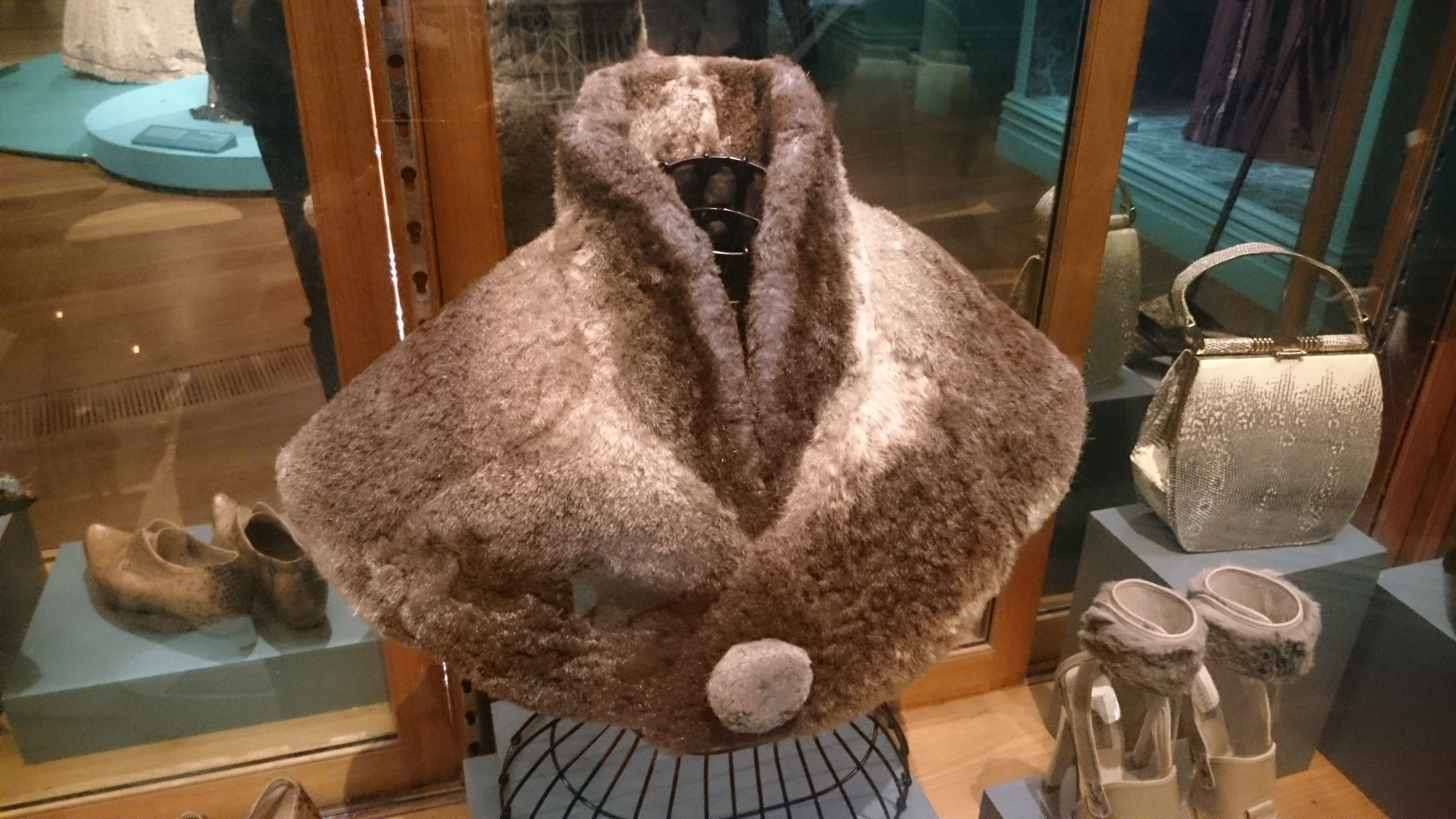
Platypus fur cape made in 1890, now in the National Gallery of Victoria

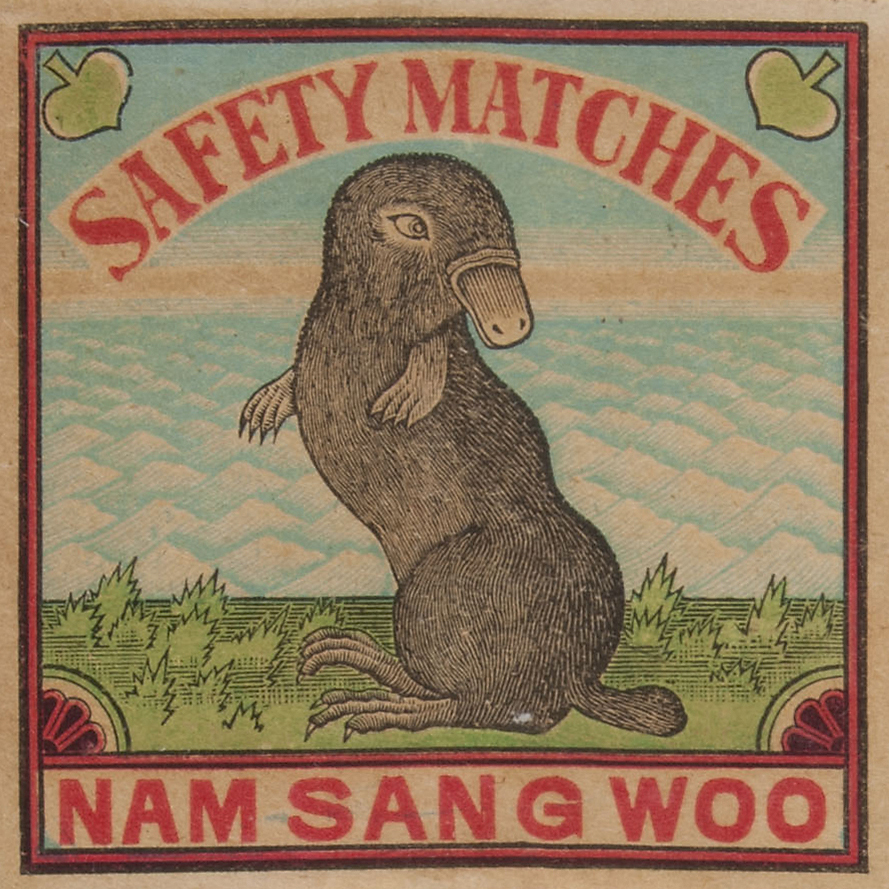
Early 20th-century matchbox label

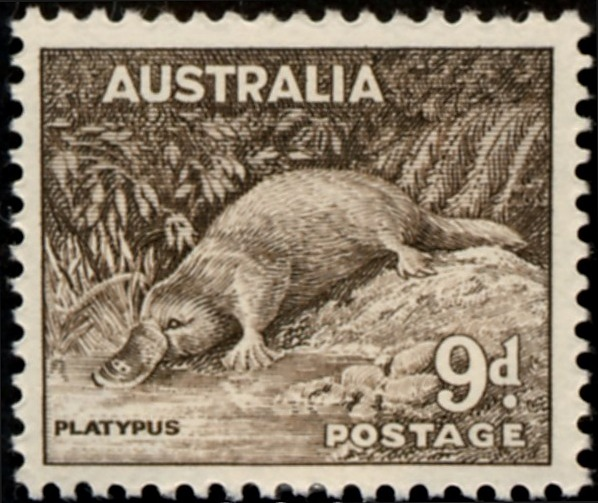
9d postage stamp from 1937

== See also ==
- Henry Burrell
- Ellis Joseph
- Fauna of Australia
