= Dharragarra =

Dharragarra Temporal range: Late Cretaceous (Cenomanian), 100.2–96.6 Ma

Scientific classification
- Kingdom: Animalia
- Phylum: Chordata
- Class: Mammalia
- Order: Monotremata
- Family: Ornithorhynchidae (?)
- Genus: †Dharragarra; Flannery, 2024
- Species: †D. aurora

Binomial name
- †Dharragarra aurora Flannery et al., 2024

Genus of fossil montremes

Dharragarra (meaning "platypus" in the Gamilaraay language) is an extinct genus of monotreme mammal from the Late Cretaceous (Cenomanian) Griman Creek Formation of Australia. The genus contains a single species, D. aurora, known from a partial left mandibular ramus. Dharragarra was likely more closely related to the living platypus than many other monotremes of the Cretaceous.

== Discovery and naming ==
Dharragarra type locality near Lightning Ridge, Australia

The Dharragarra holotype specimen, AM F97262, was discovered in 2002 in sediments of the Griman Creek Formation (Wallangulla Sandstone Member) near Lightning Ridge, New South Wales, Australia. The specimen consists of a partial left horizontal mandibular ramus. This bone was first mentioned by Anne Musser in part of a 2013 publication, where it was identified as a steropodontid. In a 2022 monotreme evolution review, Flannery et al. alluded to it as an unnamed new genus of stem-ornithorhynchid.

In 2024, Flannery et al. described Dharragarra aurora as a new genus and species of early monotreme based on these fossil remains. The generic name, Dharragarra, is a word that means "platypus" in the Gamilaraay, Yuwaalaraay and Yuwaalayaay languages, referencing this taxon's resemblance to the extant lineage. The specific name, aurora, is a Latin word meaning "dawn", considering the taxon's position at the beginning of monotreme evolution.

Several other monotremes are known from the Griman Creek Formation, including Opalios and Parvopalus—which were described in the same publication as Dharragarra—as well as Kollikodon, Steropodon, and Stirtodon.

== Classification ==
Dharragarra is one of the oldest members of the platypus and echidna lineage, being closer to them than the coeval ornithorhynchoid Opalios. Due to the close resemblance of its jaw to that of a platypus, Dharragarra is considered one of the oldest members of the platypus stem lineage, although it likely predates the divergence of platypuses and echidnas.
