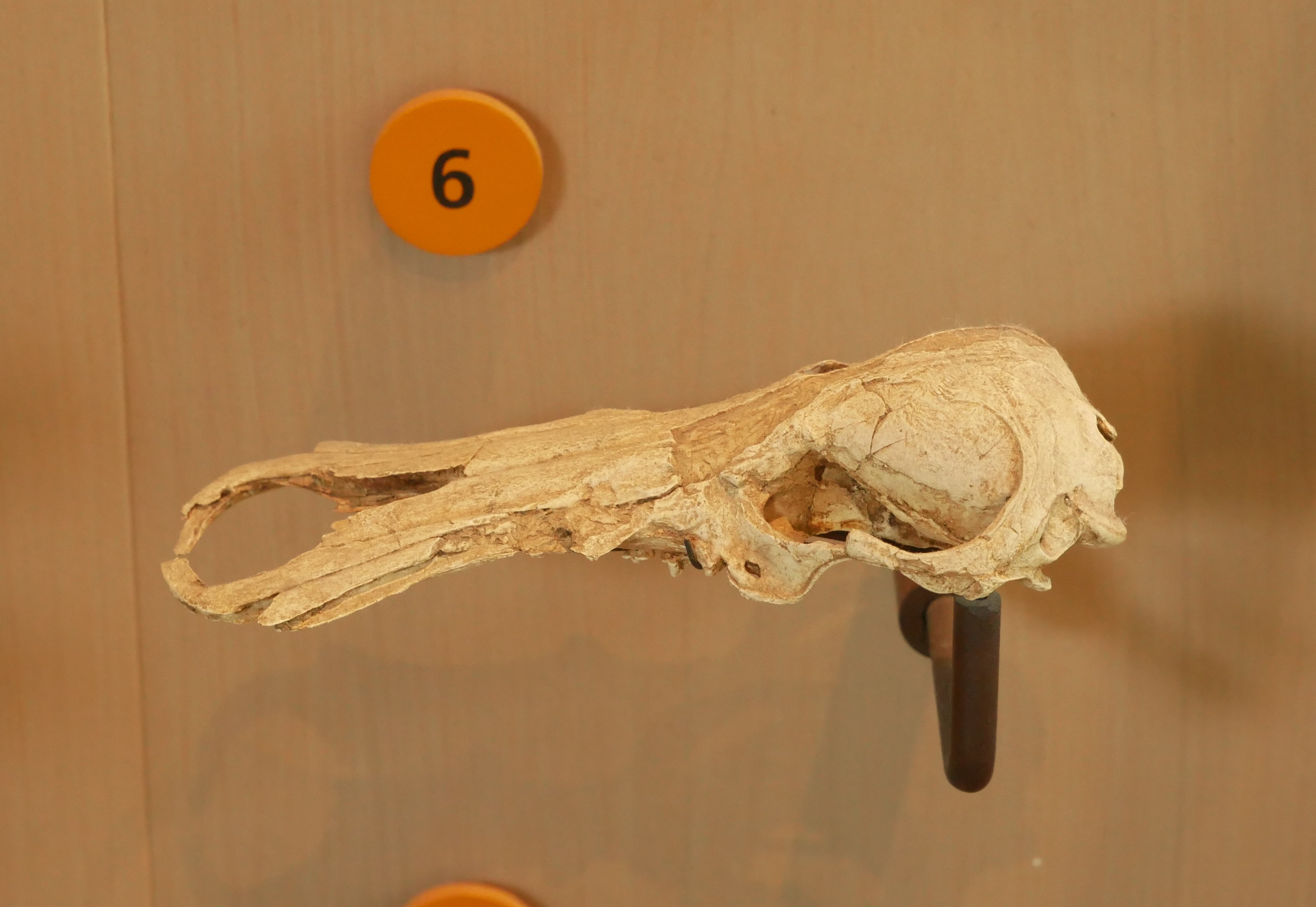
- Obdurodon dicksoni skull at the American Museum of Natural History

Scientific classification
- Kingdom: Animalia
- Phylum: Chordata
- Class: Mammalia
- Order: Monotremata
- Family: Ornithorhynchidae
- Genus: †Obdurodon; Woodburne & Tedford 1975

Type species
- Obdurodon insignis Woodburne & Tedford, 1975

Species
- O. dicksoni M. Archer et al., 1992; O. insignis Woodburne & Tedford, 1975; O. tharalkooschild Pian et al., 2013

= Obdurodon =

Obdurodon Temporal range: Late Oligocene-Early Pleistocene ~28–1.80 Ma

Extinct genus of monotremes

Obdurodon is a genus of extinct platypus-like Australian monotreme which lived from the Late Oligocene to the Early Pleistocene. Three species have been described in the genus, the type species Obdurodon insignis, plus Obdurodon dicksoni and Obdurodon tharalkooschild. Obdurodon appeared much like their modern day relative the platypus, except adults retained their molar teeth, and unlike the platypus, which forages on the lakebed, they may have foraged in the water column or surface.

== Taxonomy ==
The Obdurodon insignis holotype specimen, SAM P18087, a tooth, was uncovered in 1971 from the Etadunna Formation in the Tirari Desert of South Australia. The second specimen discovered there, AMNH 97228, is an upper right molar. In total, 4 specimens are reported, dating from the Oligocene to the Pleistocene.

The holotype tooth was placed into the newly erected genus Obdurodon upon description in 1975 by American palaeontologists Michael O. Woodburne and Richard H. Tedford. They named the genus from the Latin obduro "persist" and the Greek ὀδών (odṓn) "tooth", in reference to the permanency of the molars, a feature which is lost in the modern platypus. The species name insignis "remarkable" refers to the importance of the new taxon's "distinguishing mark" in the fossil record.

The genus is one of several to have been placed with the family Ornithorhynchidae, whose only living member is the platypus.

The second species named, Obdurodon dicksoni, occasionally called the Riversleigh Platypus, was described by Archer et al (1992) who detailed a skull and several teeth found in lower-middle Miocene deposits from the Riversleigh Ringtail Site. The type specimen, an exceptionally well preserved skull, is one of the most intact fossil skulls to be excavated from Riversleigh. The type locality is referred to as the Ringtail Site. Other than the skull and teeth, no other fossilized material of O. dicksoni has been identified.

The third known species, Obdurodon tharalkooschild is the second species described from the Riversleigh sites, and the largest species. The holotype tooth was discovered in 2012 at the "Two Trees Site", part of Riversleigh's Gag Plateau sequence, and dated to the Miocene 4.4 million years ago though dates as young as the Pliocene have been suggested. The species was described the following year by a team from the University of New South Wales including Rebecca Pian, Mike Archer, and Suzanne Joan Hand, who published the article in the Journal of Vertebrate Paleontology.

The specific name was chosen in honour of an indigenous Australian creation story for the platypus, where a duck named Tharalkoo gives birth to a chimeric creature after being ravished by a rakali.

== Description ==
Obdurodon differed from the modern platypus in that they had more permanent dentition in the spoon-shaped bill, retaining molars and incisors. The species may have foraged in the water column or surface. An analysis of the molar enamel of a specimen of Obdurodon sp. found that in the innermost enamel, it possessed a largely pattern 1 packing of enamel prisms and had in the middle third of the enamel a predominantly pattern 2 packing; the outermost enamel, by contrast, was not prismatic at all.

=== Obdurodon insignis ===
O. insignis is thought to have had a similar build to the modern platypus. The holotype is the front molar of the upper right jaw, corresponding to the M^{2} molar, with the unusual character of six roots. Fragments of jawbone have also been assigned to the species, along with a single piece of post-cranial material, a pelvis. O. insignis had one more canine tooth (NC1) than its ancestor Steropodon galmani. Recent fossil finds show that 25 million years ago O. insignis had both molars and premolars, as well as a very similar shoulder girdle to the modern platypus, indicating efficient swimming ability.

=== Obdurodon dicksoni ===
Obdurodon dicksoni was part of the Riversleigh fauna that inhabited pools and streams of freshwater of the Riversleigh rainforest environment. Unlike the modern species, O. dicksoni was a large animal that retained its molars into adulthood and had a spoon-shaped bill. The skull's profile is comparatively flatter than similar species, and as with crocodilians, this may indicate more foraging or feeding at the surface of the water. The diet is likely to have been crustaceans, the water-borne larvae of insects, or perhaps small vertebrates like fish and frogs. The only known area of its distribution, the Riversleigh site, was closed forest at the freshwater bodies it inhabited, surrounded by more open woodlands over the region's limestone karst terrain.

The septomaxilla (a part of the upper jawbone) of O. dicksoni is bigger than for the platypus, which supposes a hypertrophied beak. The coronoid and angulary processes of O. dicksoni have quite disappeared in the platypus, leaving the platypus's skull flat on the sides. This indicates the mastication technique of O. dicksoni was different from that of the platypus, using the muscles anchored to these processes. The beak of O. dicksoni has an oval hole surrounded by bones in the center, whereas the platypus' beak has a V-shape and no longer surrounded by bones. O. dicksoni retained molar teeth into adulthood, whereas in the modern platypus, the adults only have keratinized pads (juveniles lose their molar teeth upon adulthood). The shape of its beak suggests that O. dicksoni sought prey by digging in the sides of rivers, whereas the modern platypus digs in the bottom of the river. O. dicksoni had (like the platypus) shearing crests instead of incisor and canine teeth. It bore two premolars and three molars on each side of the lower jaw. The M1 had six roots, the M2 had five, and the M3 only one. The upper jaw bore two premolars and two molars on each side. The M1 had six roots, the M2 four. The premolars had only one root and a very different shape from the molars. They were separated from the shearing crests by an area without dentition. The roots of the molars were barely a third as high as the crown. Molars had only been found apart from skulls, implying that they were not well-anchored.

=== Obdurodon tharalkooschild ===
Obdurodon tharalkooschild is assumed to be very similar in form to a modern platypus, but larger, exceeding Monotrematum in size and length at 1 m (3 ft). and lived in the middle to late Miocene (15 to 5 million years ago). The wear patterns on the tooth are suggestive of crushing, perhaps by consuming hard-shelled animals such as turtles, rather than using a shearing action. O. tharalkooschild is thought to have inhabited fresh water and hunted for a variety of animal prey in the forests that dominated the Riversleigh site at the time of deposition. The species diet is assumed to have included crustacea like those consumed by the modern platypus, although larger species were available due to its greater size. The potential prey of the Riversleigh fauna also included frog, turtle, fish and the lungfish, species that are present in the deposition at the Two Tree Site of the Riversleigh formations. The ornithorhynchid species were unknown in the later fossil record at the time of discovery, and it defied the assumptions of a single lineage of a platypus-like animal that progressively lost its teeth and became smaller.

== Cultural references ==
The name given to O. tharalkooschild was first discussed in a 1990 paper by Mike Archer, an Australian mammalogist, detailing a creation story with an Ugly Duckling motif in the context of palaeontology. A philosophical examination of historical sciences such as palaeontology, published in 2018, uses the tooth of this platypus as an example of the results obtainable by multiple methods of research into traces of evidence; the author refers to the species by the vernacular "platyzilla". An illustration of O. dicksoni by Jeanette Muirhead, depicted on a rock in a stream within a rainforest, was published by the magazine Natural History (AMNH) in 1994.
