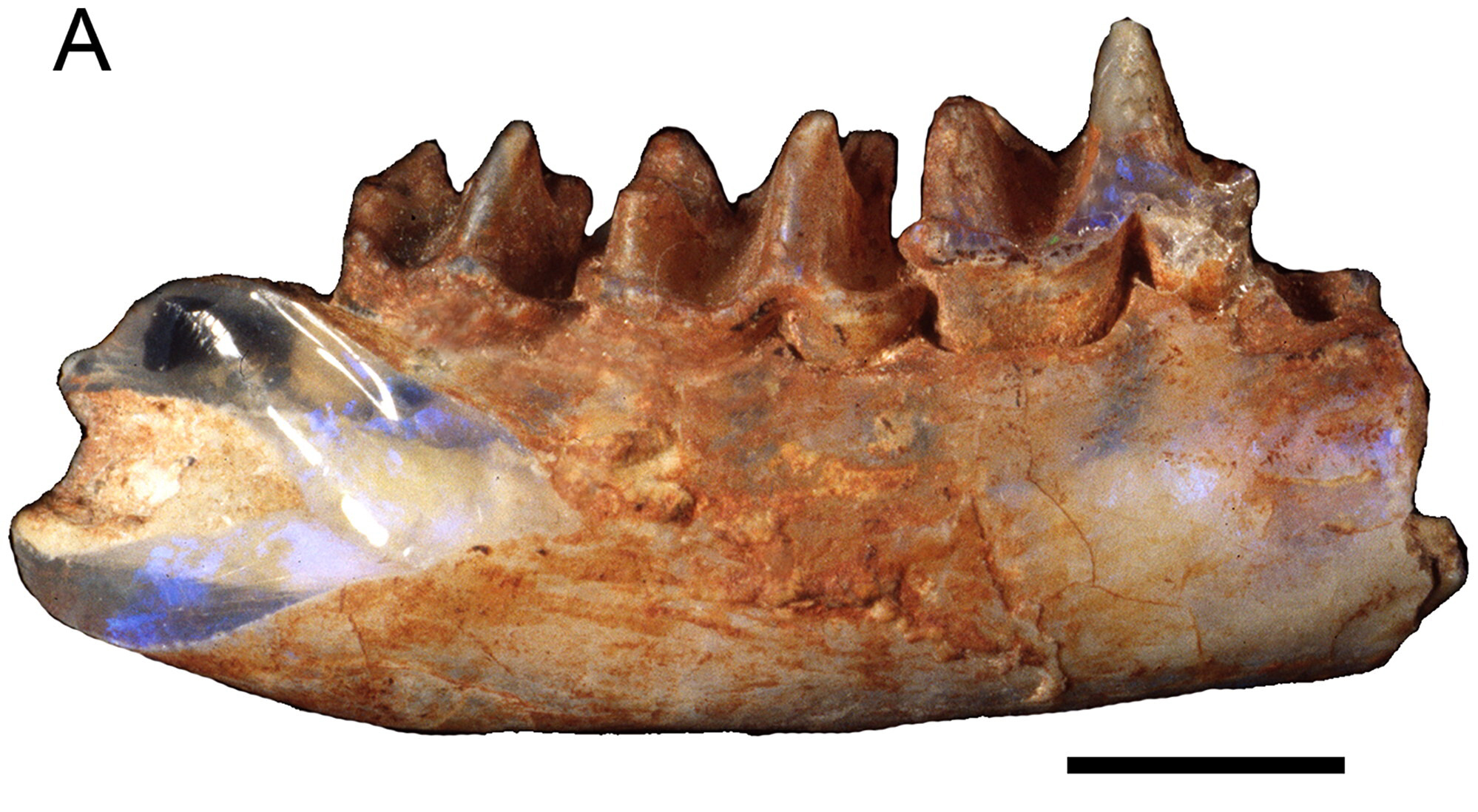
- Steropodon dentary

Scientific classification
- Kingdom: Animalia
- Phylum: Chordata
- Clade: Synapsida
- Clade: Mammaliaformes
- Class: Mammalia
- Order: Monotremata
- Family: †Steropodontidae; Archer, Flannery, Ritchie, & Jones, 1995

Type genus
- Steropodon Archer, Flannery, Ritchie, & Molnar, 1985

Genera
- †Steropodon; †Parvopalus?

= Steropodontidae =

Steropodontids Temporal range: Late Cretaceous (Cenomanian), 100.2–96.6 Ma

Extinct family of monotremes

Steropodontidae is an extinct family of early monotreme mammals known from the Cretaceous of Australia.

== Taxonomy ==
Steropodon was initially placed in the crown group monotreme family Ornithorhynchidae but was subsequently made the type genus of Steropodontidae, its own monotypic family. The monotreme Teinolophos was suggested to also belong in this family, before also being placed in a distinct family. Parvopalus, known from the same locality as Steropodon, may be a steropodontid.

== Description ==
Steropodontids are small monotremes; Steropodon has an estimated body mass of 2 kilograms (4.4 lb), and Parvopalus represents the smallest mammal found in its faunal assemblage. Members of this clade are characterized by having narrow and tall dentaries compared to other monotremes, and a prominent ascending ramus of the dentary.
