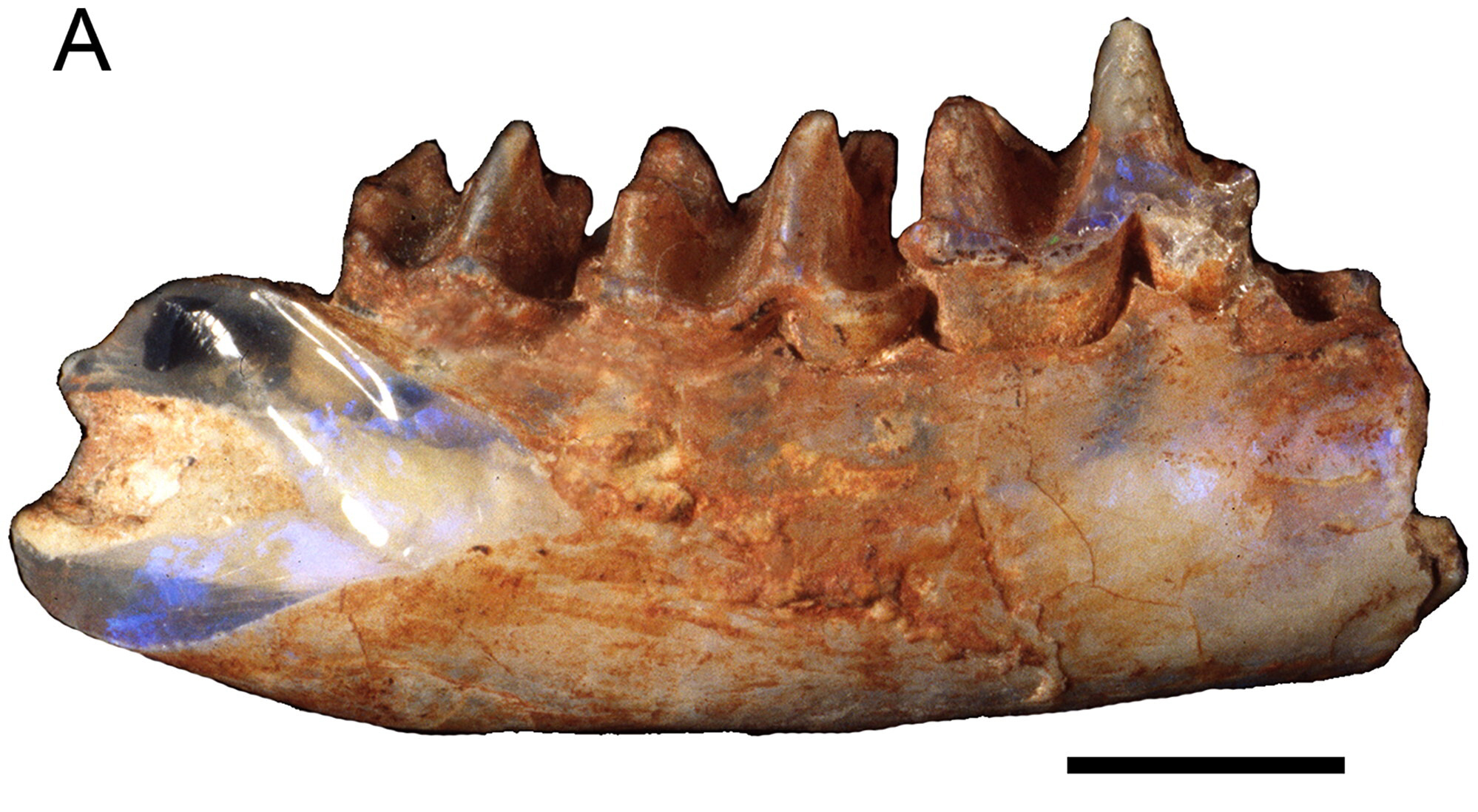
- Holotype mandible
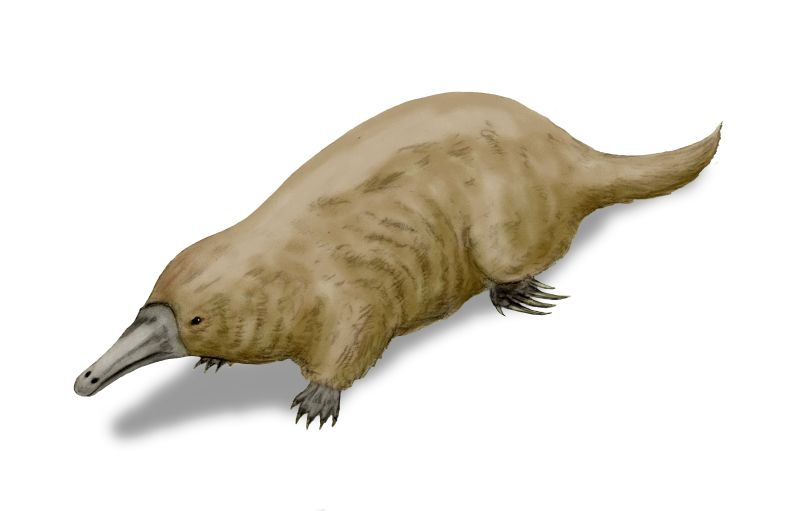
- Life reconstruction of Steropodon

Scientific classification
- Kingdom: Animalia
- Phylum: Chordata
- Class: Mammalia
- Order: Monotremata
- Family: †Steropodontidae
- Genus: †Steropodon; Archer, Flannery, Ritchie, & Molnar, 1985
- Species: †S. galmani

Binomial name
- †Steropodon galmani Archer, Flannery, Ritchie, & Molnar, 1985

= Steropodon =

Steropodon Temporal range: Cenomanian 100.2–96.6 Ma

Extinct genus of monotremes

Steropodon is a genus of prehistoric platypus-like monotreme, or egg-laying mammal. It contains a single species, Steropodon galmani, that lived about 100.2–96.6 million years ago during the Cretaceous period, from early to middle Cenomanian. It is one of the oldest monotremes discovered, and is one of the oldest Australian mammal discoveries. Several other monotremes are known from the Griman Creek Formation, including Dharragarra, Kollikodon, Opalios, Parvopalus, and Stirtodon.

== Taxonomy ==
The dentition of Steropodon is somewhat similar to that of therians—the placentals and the marsupials—specifically the presence of the tribosphenic molar tooth which was thought to be exclusive to therians since the Cretaceous. This, along with the tribosphenic molar discoveries of monotreme-relatives Ausktribosphenos and Ambondro mahabo of which the latter evolved in the Jurassic, led to the conclusion that the molar evolved independently in the two lineages. This inspired the creation of the subclasses Australosphenida—the monotremes and extinct relatives—and Tribosphenida—placentals and marsupials. However, given this classification is based only on jaw and lower-tooth remains, insufficient evidence may exist to definitively make this conclusion.

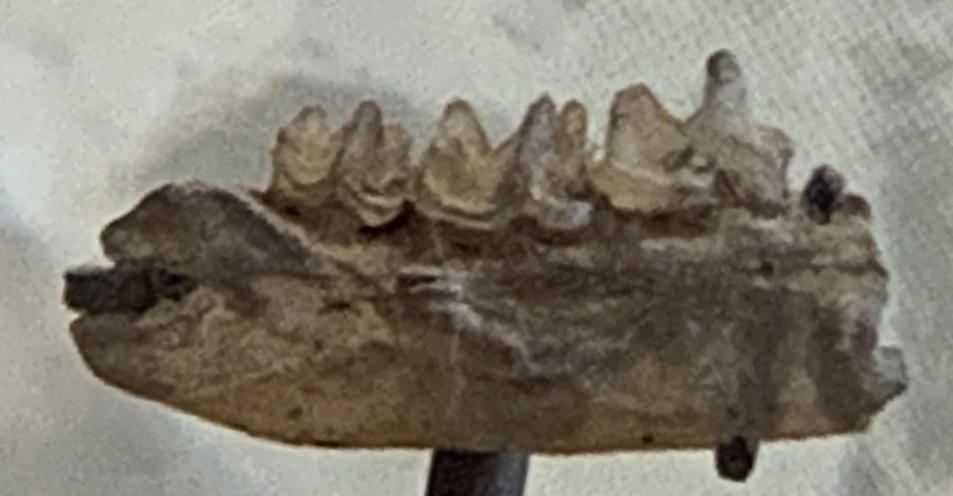
S. galmani holotype cast. At the AMNH.

It may be only described member of the family Steropodontidae. Another proposed member is Teinolophos that was moved into its own family, Teinolophidae, by Flannery et al. (2022). Edentulous partial mandible from the Finch Clay facies of the Griman Creek Formation was attributed to undescribed steropodontid by Musser (2013). On other side, Flannery et al. assumed that this mandible may belong to a new genus and species of stem ornithorhynchid.

The specific epithet is derived from the surname of the jaw's collectors, when combined with the genus name Steropodon is intended to translate as "Galman's lightning tooth".

== Description ==
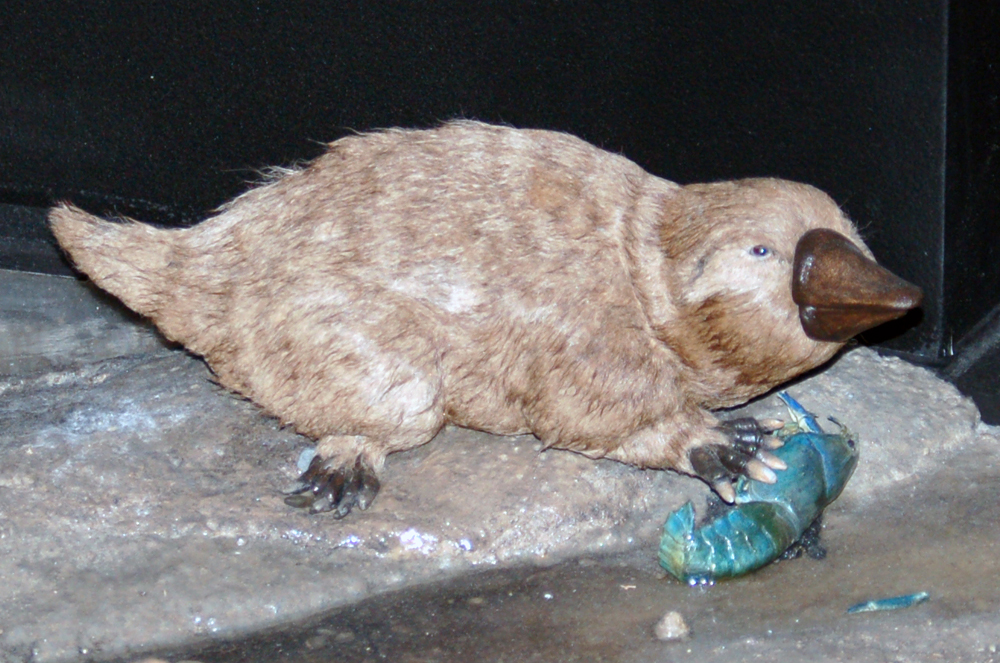
Model at the Australian Museum, Sydney

Steropodon is known only from a single opalised jaw with three molars, discovered at the Griman Creek Formation, Lightning Ridge, New South Wales, Australia, by brothers David and Alan Galman. It was a large mammal for the Mesozoic, being 40–50 centimetres (16–20 in) long. The lower molars are 5–7 millimetres (0.20–0.28 in) in length, with a width of 3–4 millimetres (0.12–0.16 in). A length of 1–2 centimetres (0.39–0.79 in) is more typical for Mesozoic mammals.

Woodburne (2003, p. 212) reports that the holotype is a right mandible named AM F66763. The preserved molars are m1–m3. Examination of the jaw fragment revealed a mandibular canal, which has been proposed to indicate the presence of a bill, similar to those of the extinct species Obdurodon dicksoni and the modern platypus Ornithorhynchus anatinus.

== See also ==
- Fossil monotremes
