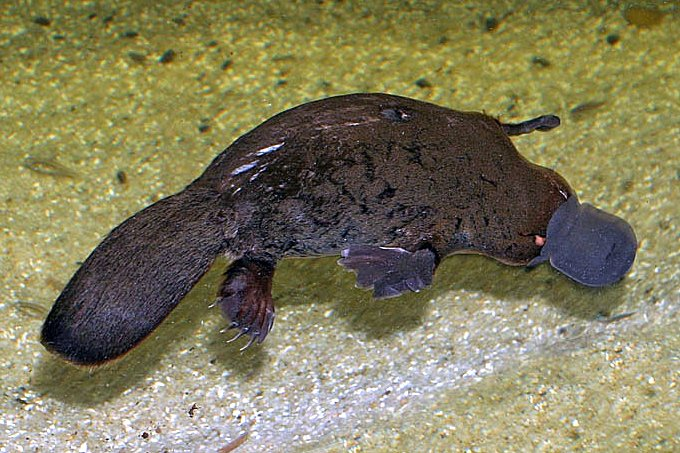
- Platypus

Scientific classification
- Kingdom: Animalia
- Phylum: Chordata
- Class: Mammalia
- Order: Monotremata
- Superfamily: Ornithorhynchoidea
- Family: Ornithorhynchidae; J. E. Gray, 1825

Genera
- ?†Dharragarra; ?†Patagorhynchus; ?†Monotrematum; †Obdurodon; Ornithorhynchus

= Ornithorhynchidae =

Ornithorhynchidae Temporal range: Oligocene to Present, 26–0 Ma Possible Late Cretaceous record

Family of monotremes

The Ornithorhynchidae /ɔːrˌnɪθəˈrɪŋkɪdiː/ are one of the two extant families in the order Monotremata, and contain only the platypus and its extinct relatives. The other family of monotremes is Tachyglossidae, or echidnas.

Within the Ornithorhynchidae are the main Cenozoic genera Ornithorhynchus and Obdurodon, and several potential stem-genera dating back to the Late Cretaceous, of which the oldest is possibly Dharragarra. Although fossil evidence suggests the presence of ornithorhynchids in the Cretaceous, phylogenetic evidence has largely found that they and the Tachyglossidae only diverged during the Cenozoic, although this varies based on the specific constraints used.

== Taxonomy ==
The following species are known:

- Family Ornithorhynchidae
  - Genus Ornithorhynchus (Pliocene to present)
    - Ornithorhynchus anatinus (the modern platypus)
  - Genus †Obdurodon (Oligocene to Pliocene)
    - †Obdurodon dicksoni
    - †Obdurodon insignis
    - †Obdurodon tharalkooschild
  - Genus ?†Dharragarra (Late Cretaceous; Cenomanian)
    - ?†Dharragarra aurora
  - Genus ?†Monotrematum (Early Paleocene)
    - ?†Monotrematum sudamericanum
  - Genus ?†Patagorhynchus (Late Cretaceous; Maastrichtian)
    - ?†Patagorhynchus pascuali

Although extant ornithorhynchids and most fossil genera are known from Australia, at least two potential genera (Monotrematum and Patagorhynchus) inhabited the southern tip of South America during the Maastrichtian and Paleocene, having presumably dispersed across Antarctica from Australia.

Another two genera, Steropodon and Teinolophos, were originally thought to belong to the Ornithorhynchidae. However, they were both placed into a new family, the Steropodontidae. This decision was made based on differences in the dentary recovered from the Griman Creek Formation, Lightning Ridge, New South Wales, Australia. This dentary is the holotype for the genus Steropodon, thus the lack of information led to the original misclassification. Further research on Teinolophos has indeed shown it to be an animal much different from ornithorhynchids, lacking a beak, possessing a more complete mammalian dentition, and retaining primitive ears connected to the jaw as in more basal mammals. In 2022 it was proposed to move Teinolophos into its own family, Teinolophidae.

The extinct Ornithorhynchus maximus has been included in Ornithorhynchus, but later placed with the echidna family Tachyglossidae as Zaglossus robustus.

=== Evolution ===
Most extinct ornithorhynchids, including the close platypus relative Obdurodon, appear to have had teeth in their jaws. This contrasts with the modern platypus, where adults are entirely toothless. It has been theorized that the loss of teeth in the platypus was a geologically recent event, occurring only in the Pleistocene (after over 95 million years of tooth presence in the ornithorhynchid lineage) after the migration of the rakali (Hydromys chrysogaster), a large semiaquatic rodent, to Australia. Competition between the rakali and platypus for hard-shelled prey may have led to trophic displacement of the platypus to instead rely on softer-bodied prey, losing its teeth in the process.
