= Michael Woodburne =

American geologist (born 1937)

Michael Osgood Woodburne (born 1937) is an American geologist currently Professor Emeritus at University of California, Riverside and an Elected Fellow of the American Association for the Advancement of Science.

Woodburne earned B.S. and Master’s degrees from the University of Michigan, and Ph.D. from UC Berkeley.

Woodburne undertook a major career of collecting and studying Neogene fossil mammals from Australia, North America, South America, and Europe. Perhaps his most memorable discovery was the first fossil land mammal from the Eocene of Seymour Island of the Antarctic Peninsula (Woodburne and Zinsmeister, 1982 (Science 218, pp. 284-286). This and subsequent work by him and Argentine colleagues demonstrated the strong Eocene mammal continuity between the Antarctic Peninsula and mainland South America on the one hand, and the faunal separation at that time between the Antarctic Peninsula and Australia on the other.
