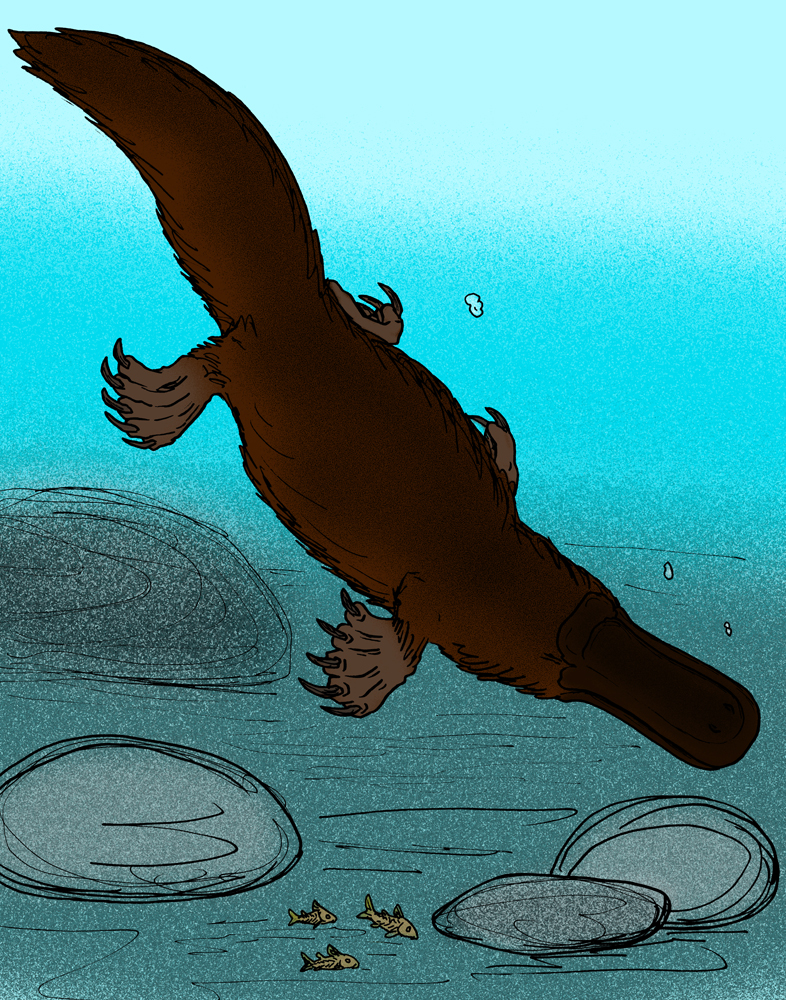
- Artist's restoration as an Obdurodon-like animal

Scientific classification
- Kingdom: Animalia
- Phylum: Chordata
- Class: Mammalia
- Order: Monotremata
- Family: Ornithorhynchidae (?)
- Genus: †Monotrematum; Pascual et al. 1992
- Species: †M. sudamericanum

Binomial name
- †Monotrematum sudamericanum Pascual et al. 1992

= Monotrematum =

Monotrematum Temporal range: Early Paleocene (Peligran) ~61 Ma

Extinct genus of monotremes

Monotrematum sudamericanum is an extinct monotreme species from the Paleocene (Peligran) Salamanca Formation in Patagonia, Argentina. It is one of only two monotremes found outside Oceania.

== Taxonomy ==
The species was described in 1992 and assigned to a new genus Monotrematum as the type. It is currently the only known species of the genus. The authors compared their fossil material to the genus Obdurodon, ornithorhynchid species first discovered at Australian fossil sites in 1975. It is considered to possibly be a stem-ornithorhynchid, although this is uncertain given that several divergence estimates have found the family to be significantly younger.

== Description ==
Monotrematum sudamericanum is known only from two lower and one upper platypus-like teeth. It is the only known non-Australasian ornithorhynchid. The main difference, apart from continent and age, is its size: the teeth of Monotrematum are around twice as large as those of other similar species in the related genus Obdurodon. The teeth of M. sudamericanum presently reside in the collections of Museo de La Plata and Museo Paleontológico Egidio Feruglio, both in Argentina.

According to Pascual, "The preserved enamel in the central region shows that the crown pattern is almost identical to that of Obdurodon: it is composed of two V-shaped lobes, the anterior of which is wider, separated from the posterior one by a valley that connects the lingual and buccal sides of the crown separating the anterior and posterior lobes."
