= Rubin Harold Landau =

American physicist and professor

- Born: 1944 (age 81–82)
- Education: B.S., Cornell University; M.S. and Ph.D., University of Illinois
- Awards: Fellow, American Physical Society; American Association of University Professors
- Scientific career
- Workplaces: University of Pittsburgh; University of British Columbia; Oregon State University

Rubin Harold Landau (born 1944) is a Professor Emeritus of Oregon State University's physics faculty, and a Fellow of the American Physical Society.

== Early life and education ==
Rubin Harold Landau, the son of Philip and Bertha (Israel) Landau, was born in 1944 in New York City. He married Rebecca L. Kamelhar in 1965, and they had a daughter, Loretta. They divorced in 1984, and Landau married Janet Wilson Harris in 1986.

Landau earned his baccalaureate degree at Cornell University in 1965. His 1966 Master of Science, as well as his 1970 Doctor of Philosophy, were both from the University of Illinois. His dissertation, titled Models for meson-deuteron scattering in the resonant region, was advised by D.G. Ravenhall.

== Career ==
Landau held research associate positions at the University of Pittsburgh (1970–1972) and the University of British Columbia (1972–1974) before accepting a professorship at Oregon State University in 1974. Landau held joint appointments there in Physics and Computer Science Departments from 1996 to 2005.

From 1974–1984 he was a visiting faculty member at the TRIUMF in Vancouver, Canada; and in 1977 at Lawrence Berkeley Laboratory. In 1980 he was a senior fellow at the University of Surrey in Guildford, England. Landau founded OSU's Computational Physics degree program, and has written more than 100 papers describing "computational studies of the scattering of elementary particles from subatomic systems," as well as "momentum space quantum mechanics."

== Selected publications ==
=== Books ===
- Landau, Rubin H. (2008-07-11). Quantum Mechanics II: A Second Course in Quantum Theory. John Wiley & Sons. ISBN 978-3-527-61744-9.
- Landau, Rubin H.; Páez, Manuel José (2026). Computational Problems for Physics: With Guided Solutions Using Python. Taylor & Francis Group. ISBN 978-1-041-16698-6.
- Landau, Rubin H.; Fink, Paul J. (1993). A scientist's and engineer's guide to workstations and supercomputers: coping with Unix, RISC, vectors, and programming. New York: Wiley. ISBN 978-0-471-53271-2.

=== Articles ===
- Rowe, Glenn; Salomon, Martin; Landau, Rubin H. (1978-07-01). "Energy-dependent phase shift analysis of pion-nucleon scattering below 400 MeV". Physical Review C. 18 (1). American Physical Society: 584–589. doi:10.1103/PhysRevC.18.584.
- Landau, Rubin H. (27 January 1975). "Scattering of pions from 3He and 4He calculated with realistic form factors". Annals of Physics.
- Tsushima, K.; Lu, D. H.; Thomas, A. W.; Saito, K.; Landau, R. H. (1 May 1999). "Charmed mesic nuclei: Bound D and 𝐷 states with 208⁢Pb". Physical Review C. 59 (5). American Physical Society: 2824–2828. arXiv:nucl-th/9810016. doi:10.1103/PhysRevC.59.2824.
- Landau, R. H.; Phatak, S.C; Tabakin, F (June 1973). "Improved theoretical pion-nucleus optical potentials". Annals of Physics.
- Thomas, A.W.; Landau, R.H. (February 1980). "Pion-deutron and pion-nucleus scattering — a review". Physics Reports. 58 (3): 121–212.
- Landau, R.H.; Thomas, A.W. (19 June 1978). "A theory of low energy pion-nucleus scattering". Nuclear Physics A. 302 (2): 461–492.

== Awards, honors ==
- 1998 American Physical Society, Division of Computational Physics Fellowship, cited For innovative developments and practical applications of computational quantum physics to the scattering and exotic bound states of elementary particles, and for original books in quantum mechanics and computational physics.
- 2008 Krell Institute Undergraduate Computational Engineering and Sciences (UCES) Award
