= Amy Atwater =

American paleontologist

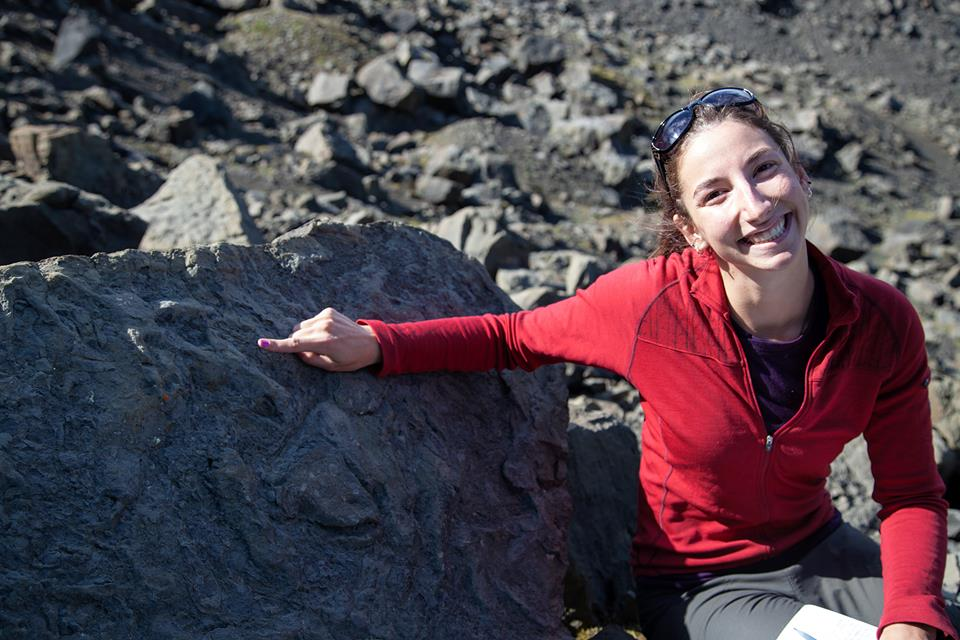
- Atwater with fossil bird tracks
- Education: University of Oregon; University of Texas at Austin
- Scientific career
- Workplaces: National Park Service; Museum of the Rockies; United States Geological Survey

Amy Atwater is an American author, paleontologist, and science communicator. She runs a popular paleontology themed science communication social media page on Instagram under the handle "mary_annings_revenge", inspired by the 18th century paleontologist Mary Anning. Atwater is the first-ever Director of Paleontology of the Morrison, CO based non-profit organization Friends of Dinosaur Ridge home of North America's most visited in-situ dinosaur track site at Dinosaur Ridge which is a part of the Morrison-Golden Fossil Areas National Natural Landmark. Atwater is an expert in mammalian evolution and described three new omomyine (primates, haplorhini) taxa from the Eocene Friars Formation of Southern California as well as research on Proboscidea, Borophagine, geochronology, and the effects of topography and climate change on mammal diversity. Atwater was named as president-elect of the Colorado Scientific Society in 2025.

== Career ==
Atwater received her B.S. in geological sciences: Paleontology Track with a minor in anthropology in 2013 from the University of Oregon Clark Honors College. She earned a M.A. in anthropology in 2017 as a NSF Graduate Research Fellow from the University of Texas at Austin by publishing her thesis titled "New Middle Eocene omomyines (primates, haplorhini) from the Friars Formation of San Diego County, California"

Atwater has worked for the National Park Service as scientist and park ranger in Arches NP, Denali NP, Big Bend NP, and John Day Fossil Beds. Atwater worked as the Paleontological Collections Manager for the Museum of the Rockies in Bozeman Montana from 2017 until 2021. Atwater has worked for the United States Geological Survey as a Curator and Museum Specialist for the Geologic Materials Repository. Atwater has worked for Sternberg Museum Science Camps as an instructor.

Atwater is the author of the popular children's book The Fossil Keeper's Treasure in collaboration with illustrator Natalia Cardozo, published by Magic Cat Publishing.

== Media and podcasts ==
Atwater has had many media appearances as an author, paleontologist and science communicator, which include being featured in video and television appearances for C-SPAN, PBS – EONS, PBS, Canadian Broadcasting Corporation and local programing. Atwater has a portrait featured in the Bearded Lady Project museum exhibit and book. Atwater has been interviewed as a paleontologist and science communicator for many podcasts and web series. Atwater has been feature in The Colorado Magazine, The New York Times, and Huffington Post. Atwater has written articles for the Geological Society of America, Palaeo-Electronica, and the National Park Service. Atwater currently co-hosts the podcast Weird & Dead with Dr. Meaghan Wetherell.

== Selected works ==
- The Fossil Keeper's Treasure (illustrator, Natalia Cardozo), Magic Cat Publishing
