= Shontz =

Shontz is a surname. Notable people with the surname include:

- Orfa Jean Shontz (1876–1954), American attorney and judge
- Patricia Shontz (1933–1998), American economist, columnist, businesswoman, and academic
- Suzanne Shontz, American computer scientist and applied mathematician

== See also ==
- Shonte
- Shrontz
