= Shonte =

Shonte is a given name. Notable people with the name include:

- Shonte Peoples (born 1972), Canadian football player
- Shonte Seale (born 1999), Barbadian netball player

== See also ==
- Shontz
