= NSF Graduate Research Fellowship Program =

Program for funding graduate students

The National Science Foundation Graduate Research Fellowship Program (NSF-GRFP) is a grant awarded annually by the National Science Foundation to approximately 2,000 students pursuing research-based Master's and doctoral degrees in the natural, social, and engineering sciences at US institutions. As of 2024, the fellowship provides an honorarium of $16,000 to be placed towards the cost of tuition and fees at the university the fellow attends; it also awards the student directly with an annual $37,000 stipend for three years, leading to an anticipated total award amount of $159,000.

Each recipient could previously apply for a one-time-only travel award for $1,000. This travel award was previously for international research activities or presenting at an international scientific conference. However, in 2010, this opportunity was converted to the Nordic Research Opportunity, which is intended to facilitate collaborations between U.S. graduate fellows and scholars at Finnish, Swedish, Danish, and Norwegian research institutions.

== Award history ==
The Graduate Research Fellowship was first awarded in 1952, with the goal of encouraging basic scientific research and ensuring comprehensive, competitive research programs for U.S. students. Since 1952, the NSF has funded over 75,000 Graduate Research Fellowships. Many former graduate fellows have gone on to become Nobel laureates and members of the National Academy of Sciences. Some well known NSF GRFP alumni include Eric Cornell, Steven Chu, Jennifer Richeson, Sergey Brin, Amy Mainzer, Steven Levitt, Burton Richter, Amy Atwater and John C. Mather.

== Award distribution ==
The NSF GRFP has struggled with an uneven distribution of the award to a select few graduate schools. In 2019, 31% of the grants were awarded to students of only 10 elite academic universities, with 14% of them awarded to just the top three: Berkeley, MIT, and Stanford. This distribution has been suggested to perpetuate inequality in science, as graduate students at less elite academic universities often have a greater need for funding. In addition, elite universities, both graduate and undergraduate level, often have greater resources designed to help students submit successful applications. Awareness of the fellowship, resources to help apply, research opportunities in undergrad, financial freedom to work in a lab in college, and undergraduate support are also important factors considered contributors to an uneven distribution. Between 2019 and 2021, the distribution has favored the so-called "elite" institutions less, with the top ten's share dropping to 26% and the share of the top three dropping to 12%.

An alternative explanation is that the students awarded the GRFP, who come from many different social and economic backgrounds, naturally gravitate towards the best nationwide institutions for research. The GRFP often vastly increases awardee's academic freedom to choose between labs and universities, since they are less reliant on departmental funding.

Until 2016 the NSF GRFP allowed any number of applications before starting graduate school, and two applications once enrolled. In 2016 the NSF reduced the number of times an enrolled graduate student could apply to only once during their graduate career. This was announced as a way to improve the chances of undergraduate applicants who have not yet chosen a graduate program. These improved chances were to encourage more undergrads to apply. However, in 2018 the number of awards received by the top 10 universities was greater than any since 2011, and an even greater number of undergraduates awarded the fellowship came from the top 30 schools.

Between 2015 and 2021, Berkeley (504), MIT (440), and Cornell (271) were the top universities from which fellows received undergraduate degrees; the top three universities affiliated with graduate students receiving NSF-GRFP awards were Berkeley (758), Stanford (634), and MIT (531).

Awards by Top Undergrad. Inst.	2015-21	Awards by Top Grad. Inst.	2015-21
University of California, Berkeley	504	University of California, Berkeley	758
Massachusetts Institute of Technology	440	Stanford University	634
Cornell University	271	Massachusetts Institute of Technology	531
Harvard University	248	University of Michigan-Ann Arbor	409
Stanford University	240	Harvard University	359
Columbia University	211	Cornell University	310
Princeton University	210	University of Washington-Seattle	297
University of Texas at Austin	209	Columbia University	247
University of Michigan-Ann Arbor	198	University of Texas at Austin	243
University of Chicago	183	Georgia Institute of Technology	233

== Application requirements ==
The competition is open to U.S. citizens and national and permanent residents who are enrolled or intend to be enrolled in full-time research-based graduate programs in an eligible STEM field. Undergraduates seniors and bachelor degree holders may apply before enrolling in a degree granting graduate program, however once enrolled in a graduate program graduate students are limited to only one application submitted their first year. Generally applicants cannot have a masters or professional degree when applying, unless returning after two or more years and not enrolled in a graduate program. In 2025, NSF changed the eligibility requirements making second-year graduate students and people already holding a graduate degree ineligible to apply for the grant.

In order to apply, the applicant must submit biographical information, undergraduate and graduate transcripts where applicable, three letters of recommendation, and two essays: a personal statement with relevant experience and a research proposal stating future goals.

Applications are typically due in late October, with different deadlines for different scientific fields. Letters of recommendation are typically due in early November. Fellows and students selected for Honorable Mention are usually notified in April of the year following their application. Together, the Fellows and Honorable Mention students make up about the top 30% of applicants with around 2,000 each. However, in the 2025 cycle, only 1,000 fellowships was awarded and with 3,000 applicants selected for Honorable Mention. Two months after the award announcement, an addition 500 fellowships were awarded to applicants who initially got an Honorable Mention, with none of the additional awardees in the life sciences.

== Additional information ==
The grant is administered through the institution the student is attending. The fellowship is five years with three years of funding, and the funding can be postponed for up to two 12-month increments as long as the recipient continues to engage in work leading to the eligible graduate degree. When funding is not being drawn the student is on 'reserve', while funding is being drawn the student is 'tenured'. For instance, a recipient might postpone the grant's funding while working as a teaching assistant or research assistant. This is referred to as "reserve". On the third year of reserve, the recipient will automatically forfeit any remaining years of tenure.

In 2020, the NSF announced it will emphasize the fields of artificial intelligence, quantum information science, and computationally intensive research when awarding fellowships. This received criticism from the science community largely due to concerns that the new focus could further disadvantage under-represented groups.

== See also ==
- Hertz Fellowship
- Computational Science Graduate Fellowship
- NDSEG Fellowship
- USDA NIFA Fellowship Program
