= Computational Science Graduate Fellowship =

Highly-selective graduate program sponsored by the United States Department of Energy

The Computational Science Graduate Fellowship (CSGF) program is a highly selective graduate fellowship program sponsored by the United States Department of Energy and administered by the Krell Institute. Started in 1990, it awards four-year fellowships for American graduate students pursuing graduate degrees in all areas of computational science.

The award pays full tuition and an annual stipend of $45,000.

== Notable recipients ==
- Kristen Grauman

== See also ==
- Hertz Fellowship
- NDSEG Fellowship
- NSF Graduate Research Fellowship
- USDA NIFA Fellowship Program
