= Shrontz =

Shrontz is a surname. Notable people with the surname include:

- Clark Schrontz, American football player
- Frank Shrontz (1931–2024), American businessman

== See also ==
- Shontz
