= Suzanne Shontz =

American computer scientist and applied mathematician

Suzanne Michelle Shontz is an American computer scientist and applied mathematician specializing in scientific computing, and particularly mesh smoothing and mesh improvement for the finite element method. She works at the University of Kansas as associate dean of the School of Engineering, as a professor in the Department of Electrical Engineering and Computer Science, and as an affiliate of the Department of Mechanical Engineering, Bioengineering Program, and Institute for Information Sciences.

== Education and career ==
Shontz earned double bachelor's degrees in 1999 from the University of Northern Iowa: a B.A. in mathematics and a B.S. in chemistry, both summa cum laude. She received an honorable mention for the 1999 Alice T. Schafer Prize of the Association for Women in Mathematics for her undergraduate research in mathematics. She continued her studies at Cornell University, where she received double master's degrees in computer science and applied mathematics in 2002 and completed her Ph.D. in applied mathematics in 2005. Her dissertation, Numerical Methods for Problems with Moving Meshes, was supervised by Stephen Vavasis.

After postdoctoral research at the University of Minnesota, she became an assistant professor in the Department of Computer Science and Engineering at Pennsylvania State University in 2006. In 2012, she moved to Mississippi State University as an assistant professor, while continuing to hold an adjunct faculty position at Pennsylvania State University. She joined the University of Kansas as an associate professor in 2014, and was promoted there to full professor in 2021. She became associate dean for research in 2022, associate dean for research and graduate programs in 2023, and associate dean for graduate and online education in 2025.

== Recognition ==
Shontz was a 2011 recipient of the Presidential Early Career Award for Scientists and Engineers, given "for exemplary research in computational and data-enabled science and engineering that bridges applied mathematics, computer science, and scientific applications, and for contributions to education, including new curricula and approaches that encourage diversity in this emerging field".

She was the 2017 recipient of the University of Northern Iowa Young Alumni Award, the 2021 recipient of the IMR Fellow Award at the SIAM International Meshing Roundtable, and the 2024 recipient of the James Corones Award in Leadership, Community Building and Communication of the Krell Institute.
