= Krell Institute =

501(3)(c) corporation in Ames, Iowa

The Krell Institute is a 501(3)(c) corporation located in Ames, Iowa near Iowa State University. The organization was founded in 1997 in support of the US Department of Energy's Computational Science Graduate Fellowship program (CSGF), and has since grown to include a number of other US government contracts towards its mission of serving the science, technology, and education communities.

Krell is overseen by a four-member board of directors, including the company's President, Jim Corones. It is named for the Krell race in the 1956 science-fiction movie Forbidden Planet.

== Supported programs ==
- The Computational Science Graduate Fellowship (CSGF) for PhD students, sponsored by the US Department of Energy.
- The DEIXIS Online webzine, a component of CSGF, covering breakthroughs at the national laboratories.
- The Stewardship Science Graduate Fellowship (SSGF) for PhD students, sponsored by the National Nuclear Security Administration.
- The ASCR Discovery webzine sponsored by the US Department of Energy's Office of Advanced Scientific Computing Research (OASCR), covering research into high-performance computing.
- The now-discontinued High-Performance Computing Science Fellowship (HPCSF) for PhD students, sponsored by Lawrence Livermore National Laboratory, Lawrence Berkeley National Laboratory, and Sandia National Laboratories.
- The now-discontinued Adventures in Supercomputing program for high-school students, sponsored by Oak Ridge National Laboratory.
- The now-discontinued Undergraduate Computational Engineering and Sciences Project program for undergraduate and advanced high-school students sponsored by the US Department of Energy.

== Partnerships ==
- Krell Energy Efficiency supports programs and initiatives related to energy and education.
- Argo Navis Technology supports, among other things, the OpenSpeedShop project, which provides tools for benchmarking and optimizing code to run on high-performance computer systems.
