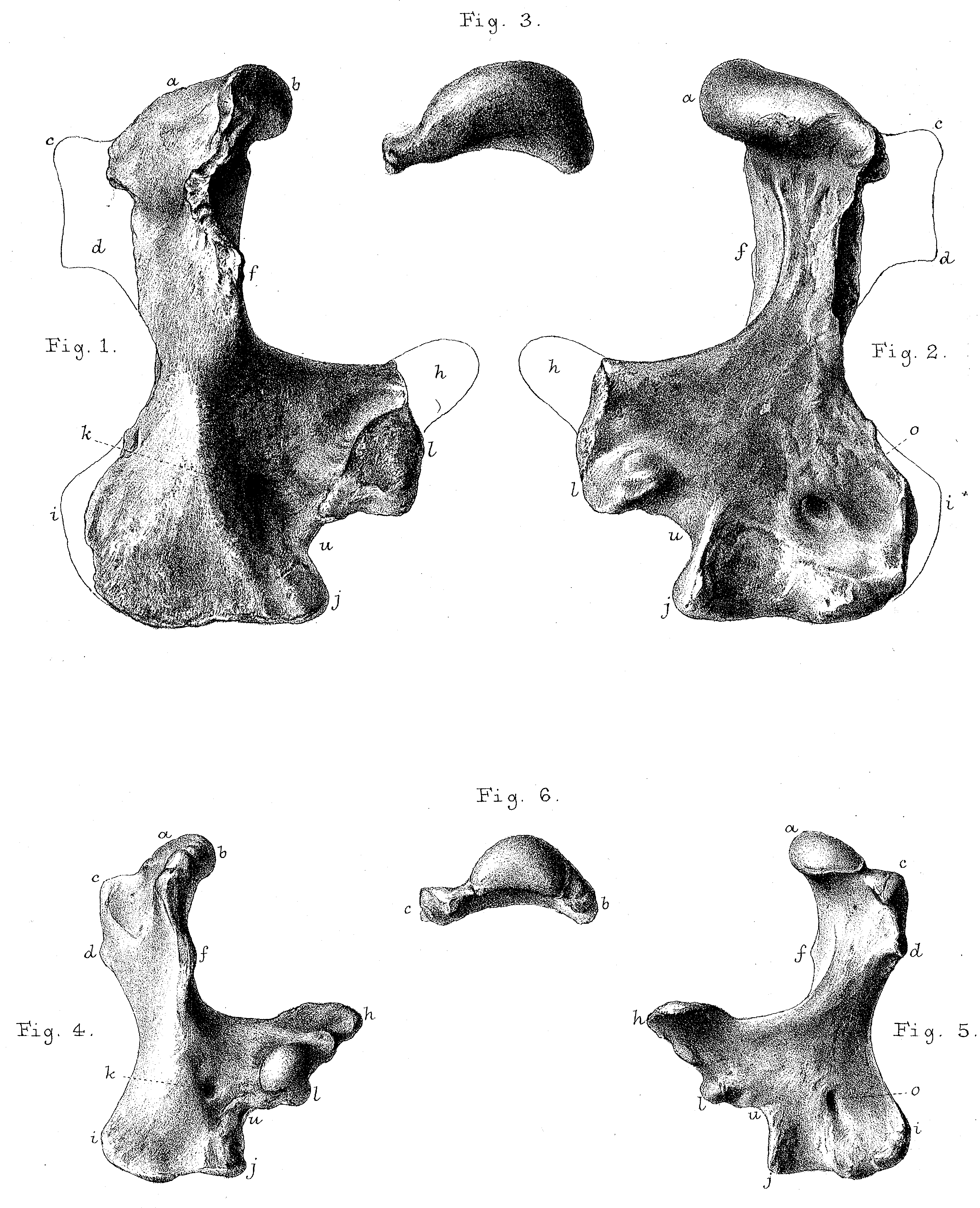
- M. owenii humerus

Scientific classification
- Kingdom: Animalia
- Phylum: Chordata
- Clade: Synapsida
- Clade: Mammaliaformes
- Class: Mammalia
- Order: Monotremata
- Family: Tachyglossidae
- Genus: †Megalibgwilia; Griffiths, Wells and Barrie, 1991

Type species
- Echidna owenii Krefft, 1868

Species
- †Megalibgwilia owenii (Krefft, 1868); †Megalibgwilia robusta (Dun, 1895)

= Megalibgwilia =

Megalibgwilia Temporal range: Pliocene–Late Pleistocene

Extinct genus of monotremes

Megalibgwilia is a genus of echidna known only from Australian fossils that incorporates the oldest-known echidna species. The genus ranged from the Pliocene until the late Pleistocene, becoming extinct about 50,000 years ago. Megalibgwilia species were more widespread in warmer and moist climates. Their extinction can be attributed to increasing aridification in Southern Australia.

Megalibgwilia was first described from a broken left humerus by Gerard Krefft in 1868 as "Echidna" owenii. In the past, many researchers didn't recognize that "Echidna" ramsayi named by Richard Owen in 1884 represents a junior synonym, though recent studies have reevaluated this. Complete skulls and postcranial fossils have since been described. A second species, M. robusta, was described in 1895 by Australian paleontologist William Sutherland Dun. Megalibgwilia comes from Greek mégas (μέγᾰς) and Wemba Wemba libgwil (plus the Latin suffix -ia), meaning echidna.

Although they are sometimes commonly referred to as giant echidnas, Megalibgwilia species are thought to have been similar in size to the contemporary western long-beaked echidna, but with slightly longer forearms. They were smaller than a large species known from fossils in Australia, Murrayglossus. M. ramsayi fossils have been found in deposits across mainland Australia and on Tasmania. M. robusta has only been found in New South Wales. Megalibgwilia was probably an insect-eater, like the short-beaked echidna, rather than a worm-eater like members of Zaglossus.

M. robusta, once thought to be a species of Zaglossus, is the oldest-known echidna and the only known Pliocene species. It has been suggested that the supposed fossil platypus Ornithorhynchus maximus was based on a humerus of this species.

Stated from the brain and behaviour article, “the short-beaked echidna has become the most widespread and successful native mammal species on the Australian continent, whereas the long-beaked echidnas have become so restricted in distribution as to now be endangered”.
