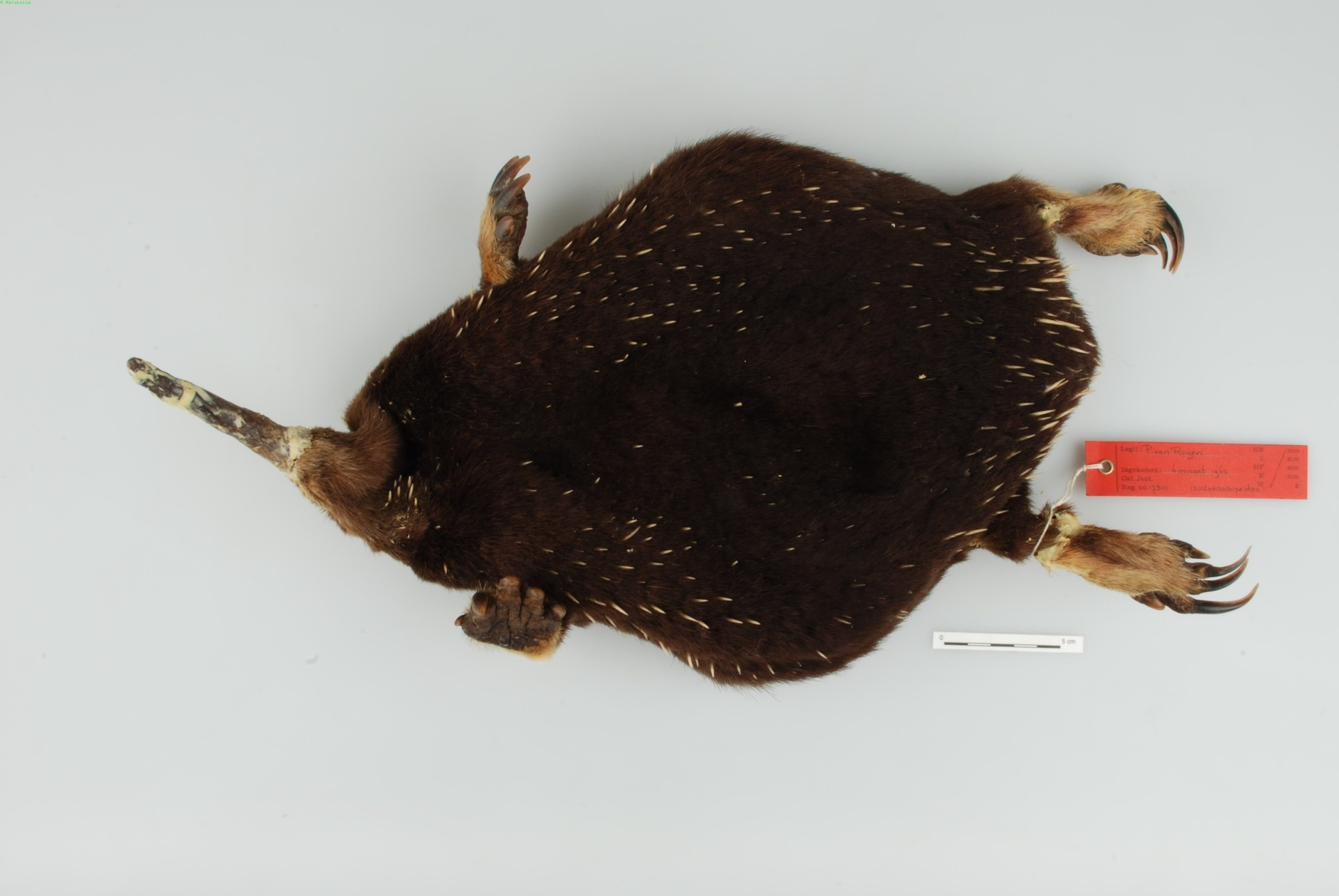
- Z. attenboroughi specimen

Conservation status
- Critically Endangered (IUCN 3.1)
- CITES Appendix II

Scientific classification
- Kingdom: Animalia
- Phylum: Chordata
- Class: Mammalia
- Order: Monotremata
- Family: Tachyglossidae
- Genus: Zaglossus
- Species: Z. attenboroughi

Binomial name
- Zaglossus attenboroughi Flannery & Groves, 1998
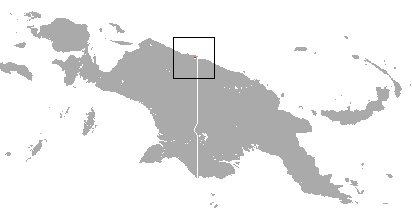

= Zaglossus attenboroughi =

Attenborough's long-beaked echidna Temporal range: Late Pleistocene – Present, 0.03–0 Ma

Species of monotreme

Zaglossus attenboroughi, also known as Attenborough's long-beaked echidna or locally as the payangko, is one of three species from the genus Zaglossus that inhabits the island of New Guinea. It lives in the Cyclops Mountains near the northern coast of the island, which are near the cities of Sentani and Jayapura in the Indonesian province of Papua in Western New Guinea. It is named in honour of naturalist Sir David Attenborough.

It is currently classified as critically endangered by the IUCN, and there had been no confirmed sightings between its initial collection in 1961 and November 2023, when the first video footage of a living individual was recorded.

== Taxonomy ==
The early taxonomy of Zaglossus saw several different specimens described as separate species or subspecies, but by the late 1960s, the genus was considered to be monotypic, pending a comprehensive evaluation of collected specimens. Subsequent systematic revision of Zaglossus by Flannery & Groves in 1998 identified three allopatric species and several subspecies present within the island. These authors established a new species, Z. attenboroughi (Attenborough's long-beaked echidna), to describe a single echidna specimen collected in 1961 at 1,600 metres (5,200 ft) near the top of Mount Rara, in the Cyclops Mountains of northern Dutch New Guinea, and named it in recognition of Attenborough's contribution to increased public appreciation of New Guinean flora and fauna through his documentary work. In 2022, Flannery and colleagues referred another adult specimen AM M9852 to Z. attenboroughi, which was collected from New Guinea in 1958 and currently housed in the Australian Museum.

== Description ==
It is the smallest member of the genus Zaglossus, being closer in size to the short-beaked echidna (Tachyglossus aculeatus). The weight of the type specimen when it was alive was estimated to be 2 to 3 kilograms (4.4 to 6.6 lb). The male is larger than the female, further differentiated by the spurs on its hind legs. The species has five claws on each foot like the eastern long-beaked echidna, and has short, very fine and dense fur, reflecting its mountain-top habitat.

The diet of Attenborough's long-beaked echidna consists primarily of earthworms, in contrast to the termites and ants preferred by the short-beaked echidna.

The long-beaked echidna is not a social animal, and it comes together with its own kind only once a year, in July, to mate. During the reproduction stage, the female lays the eggs after about eight days, with the offspring staying in their mother's pouch for around eight weeks or until their spines develop. The creature is nocturnal; it rolls up into a spiky ball when it feels threatened, resembling the behavior of a hedgehog.

== Conservation status ==
Z. attenboroughi was described from a single damaged specimen collected almost 40 years prior to its identification as a unique species, and no other specimen has been collected for decades afterward. The ongoing anthropogenic disturbance of the Cyclops Mountain forest habitat is a threat to Z. attenboroughi populations in the area, where the echidna is endangered by hunting and habitat loss. It was thought to be extinct until some of its "nose pokes" were found in the mountains of New Guinea during an expedition in 2007. These "nose pokes" result from the echidna's unique feeding technique.

Z. attenboroughi is classified as critically endangered by the IUCN. An educational campaign was initiated in local communities to educate the Papuan people about the endangered echidnas in an effort to stop the common tradition of hunting and killing the creature to share with rivals as a peace offering.

Researchers from the EDGE of Existence programme visiting Papua's Cyclops Mountains discovered burrows and tracks thought to be those of Zaglossus attenboroughi in 2007, and after further communication with locals, it was revealed that the species had possibly been seen as recently as 2005. In 2007, Attenborough's long-beaked echidna was identified as one of the top-10 "focal species" by the Evolutionarily Distinct and Globally Endangered (EDGE) project.

As of 2017, this species of echidna was among the 25 "most wanted lost" species which are the focus of Re:wild's "Search for Lost Species" initiative.

In 2023, during an expedition led by University of Oxford scientists to the Cyclops Mountains, the species was spotted on footage retrieved from a trail camera. This was more than 60 years after it was last spotted by scientists.

In May 2025, Morib and colleagues published their findings from Cyclops on an academic journal, confirming the rediscovery of Z. attenboroughi. Historically, only two species of Zaglossus has been recorded in areas within or close to Cyclops: Z. attenboroughi which has five forefoot claws like the echidnas in the captured footage and Z. bruijnii which has three forefoot claws. While Z. bartoni also has five forefoot claws, it has never been recorded in Cyclops, so the researchers concluded that the documented species represents Z. attenboroughi. They also captured footage of predation on worms and courtship behavior among multiple individuals, including a footage of a presumed male following a female, which suggests that the population is reproducing. Additionally, subfossil remains from Late Pleistocene to middle Holocene (30,000-6,000 years BP) deposits have been described.

== See also ==
- List of things named after David Attenborough and his works
