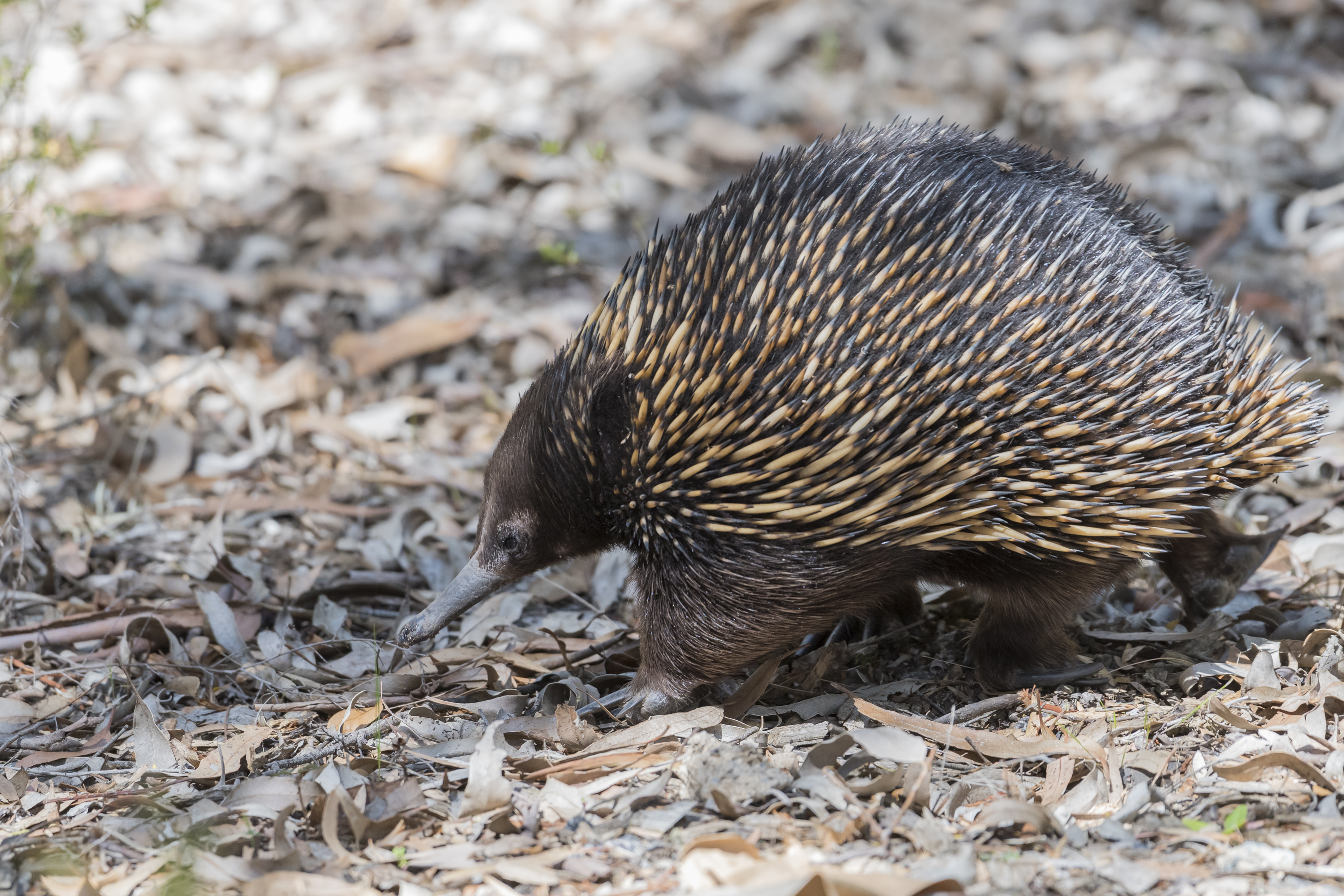
- Short-beaked echidna

Scientific classification
- Kingdom: Animalia
- Phylum: Chordata
- Class: Mammalia
- Order: Monotremata
- Superfamily: Ornithorhynchoidea
- Family: Tachyglossidae; Gill, 1872

Type genus
- Tachyglossus Illiger, 1811

Species
- Genus Tachyglossus; T. aculeatus Genus Zaglossus; Z. attenboroughi Z. bruijnii Z. bartoni Genus †Megalibgwilia †M. owenii †M. robusta Genus †Murrayglossus †M. hacketti
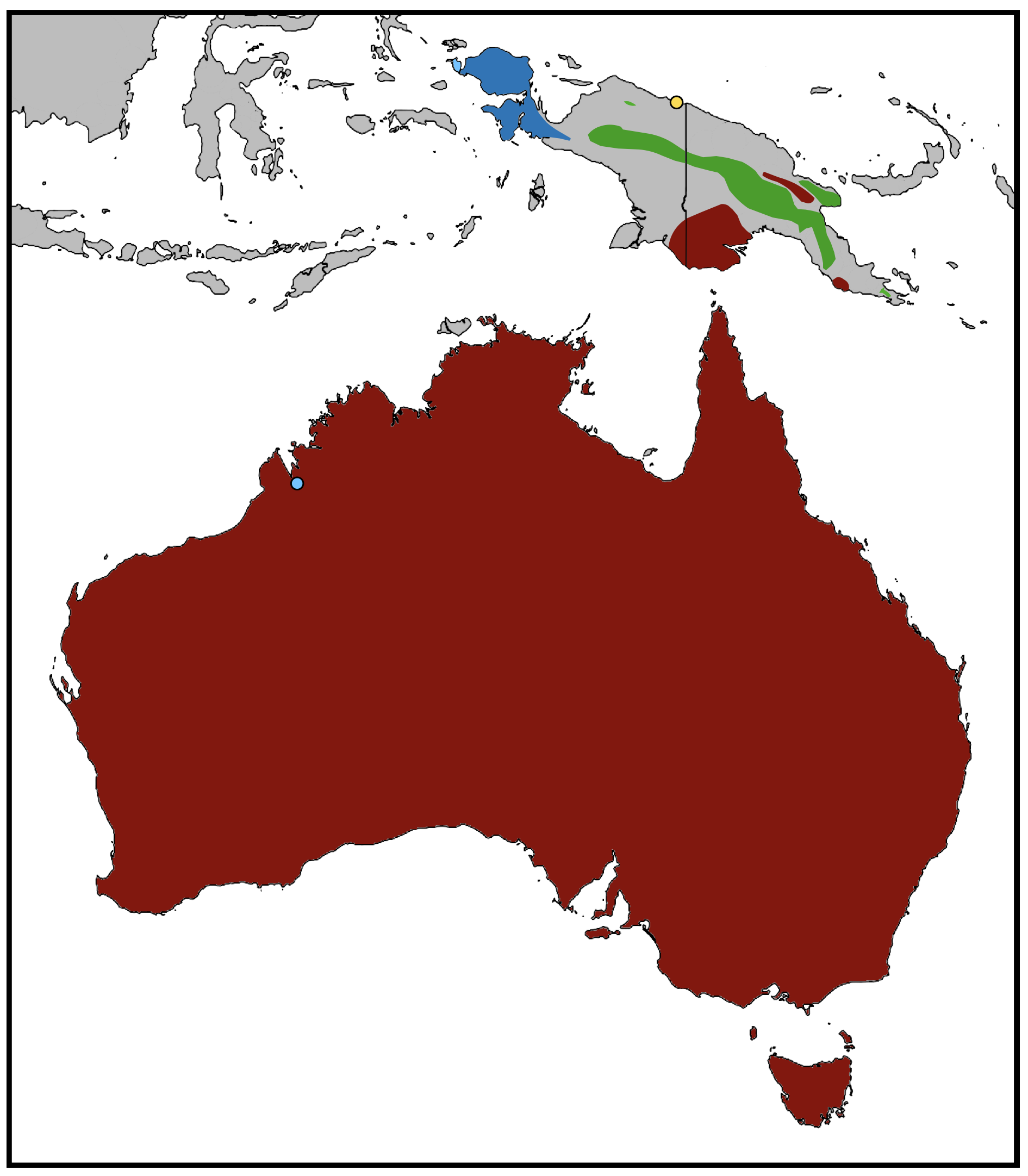
- Echidna range Short-beaked echidna Western long-beaked echidna Eastern long-beaked echidna Sir David's long-beaked echidna

= Echidna =

Echidnas Temporal range: Pliocene–Recent

Family of mammals

Echidnas (/ɪˈkɪdnəz/), sometimes known as spiny anteaters, are quill-covered monotremes (egg-laying mammals) belonging to the family Tachyglossidae /tækiˈɡlɒsɪdiː/, living in Australia and New Guinea. The four extant species of echidnas and the platypus are the only living mammals that lay eggs and the only surviving members of the order Monotremata. The diet of some species consists of ants and termites, but they are not closely related to the American true anteaters or to hedgehogs. Their young are called puggles. (Note: The Macquarie Dictionary says that the origin of the name is a perceived similarity of the neonate to a trademarked soft toy which several advertising sites date back to 1980s Australia.)

Echidnas evolved between 20 and 50 million years ago and descend from an amphibious, platypus-like monotreme.

== Etymology ==
Echidnas are possibly named after Echidna, a creature from Greek mythology who was half-woman, half-snake, as the animal was perceived to have qualities of both mammals and reptiles. An alternative explanation is a confusion with Ancient Greek: ἐχῖνος, romanized: ekhînos, lit. 'hedgehog, sea urchin'.

A synonym for the echidna, in a mid-19th century British Encyclopaedia, is, “hedgehog of the Colonists at Sidney [sic]”.

== Physical characteristics ==
Echidnas are medium-sized, solitary mammals covered with coarse hair and spines. The spines are modified hairs and are made of keratin, the same fibrous protein that makes up fur, claws, nails, and horn sheaths.

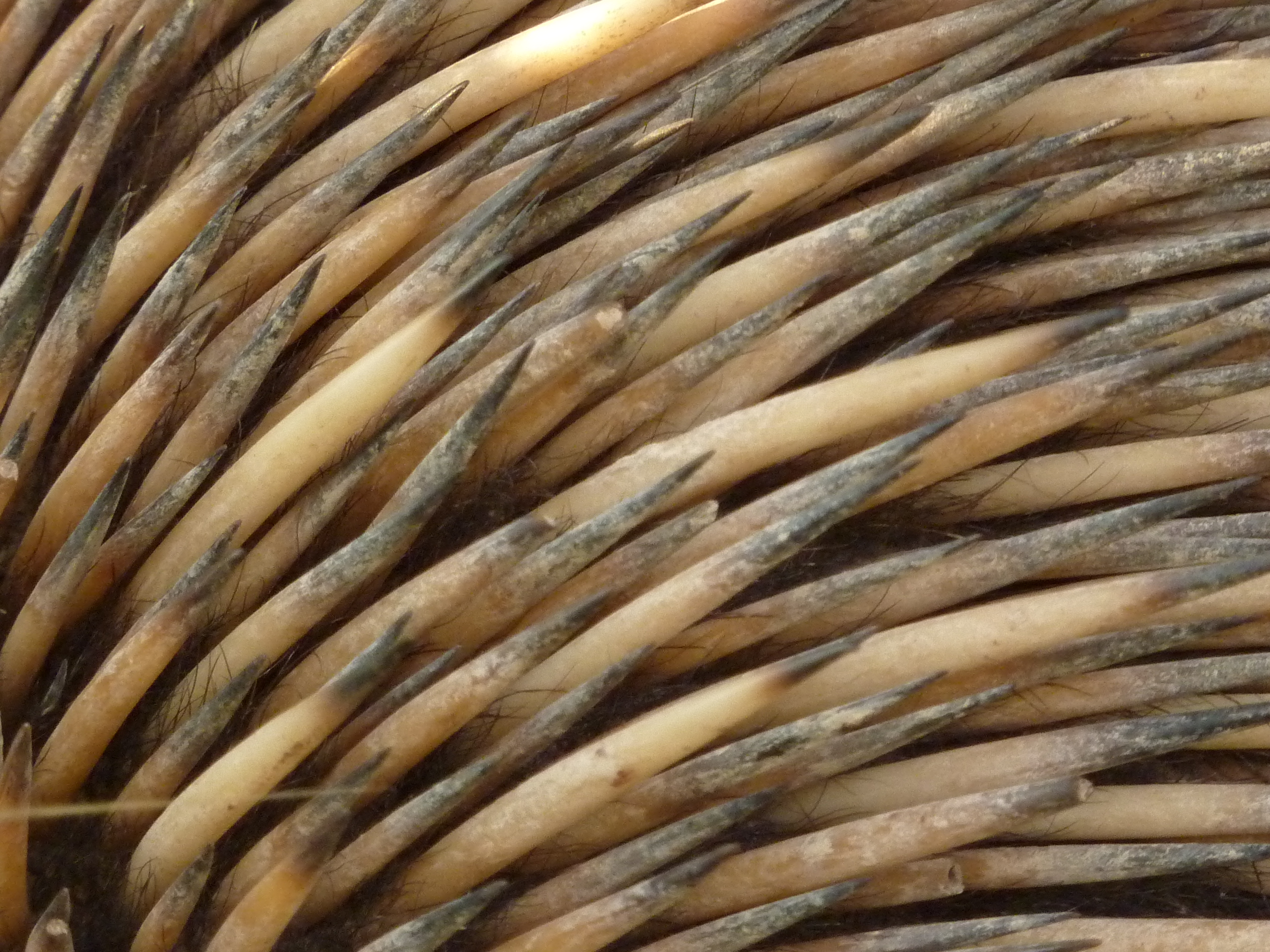
Spines of the echidna

Superficially, they resemble the anteaters of South America and other spiny mammals such as hedgehogs and porcupines. They are usually black or brown in coloration. There have been several reports of albino echidnas with pink eyes and white spines. They have elongated and slender snouts, or proboscises, that function as both mouth and nose, and which have electrosensors to find earthworms, termites, ants, and other burrowing prey. This is similar to the platypus, which has 40,000 electroreceptors on its bill, but the long-beaked echidna has only 2,000, while the short-beaked echidna, which lives in a drier environment, has no more than 400 at the tip of its snout.

Echidnas have short, strong limbs with large claws, and are powerful diggers. Their hind claws are elongated and curved backwards to aid in digging. Echidnas have tiny mouths and toothless jaws, and feed by tearing open soft logs, anthills and the like, and licking off prey with their long, sticky tongues. The ears are slits on the sides of their heads under the spines. The external ear is created by a large cartilaginous funnel, deep in the muscle. At 33 °C (91.4 °F), echidnas also possess the second-lowest active body temperature of all mammals, behind the platypus.

Despite their appearance, echidnas are capable swimmers, as they evolved from platypus-like ancestors. When swimming, they expose their snout and some of their spines, and are known to journey to water to bathe.

The first European drawing of an echidna was made in Adventure Bay, Tasmania by HMS Providence's third lieutenant George Tobin during William Bligh's second breadfruit voyage.

== Diet ==
The short-beaked echidna's diet consists mostly of ants and termites, while the Zaglossus (long-beaked) species typically eat worms and insect larvae. The tongues of long-beaked echidnas have sharp, tiny spines that help them capture their prey. They have no teeth, so they break down their food by grinding it between the bottoms of their mouths and their tongues. Echidnas' faeces are 7 cm (3 in) long and are cylindrical in shape; they are usually broken and unrounded, and composed largely of dirt and ant-hill material.

== Habitat ==
Echidnas do not tolerate extreme temperatures; they shelter from harsh weather in caves and rock crevices. Echidnas are found in forests and woodlands, hiding under vegetation, roots or piles of debris. They sometimes use the burrows (both abandoned and in use) of animals such as rabbits and wombats. Individual echidnas have large, mutually overlapping territories.

== Anatomy ==
Echidnas and platypuses are the only egg-laying mammals, the monotremes. The average lifespan of an echidna in the wild is estimated at 14–16 years. Fully grown females can weigh about 4.5 kilograms (9.9 lb), the males 33% larger, at about 6 kilograms (13 lb). Though the internal reproductive organs differ, both sexes possess an identical single cloaca opening for urination, defecation, and mating.

Male echidnas have non-venomous spurs on the hind feet, similar to the venomous male platypus.

The front and hind feet of echidna have distinct morphologies that perform distinct jobs. The front feet has 5 toes that are specialized for digging as well as tearing open downed trees in search of termites. The back feet are unique as they face backwards. This allows the echidna to push soil out of the way as it digs. Located on each hind foot is two claws that are used for grooming.

Due to their low metabolism and accompanying stress resistance, echidnas are long-lived for their size; the longest recorded lifespan for a captive echidna is 50 years, with anecdotal accounts of wild individuals reaching 45 years.

The echidna's brain is half neocortex, compared to 80% of a human brain. Contrary to previous research, the echidna does enter REM sleep, but only in a comfortable temperature around 25 °C (77 °F). At lower or higher temperatures of 15 °C (59 °F) and 28 °C (82 °F), REM sleep is suppressed.

== Reproduction ==
The female lays a single soft-shelled, leathery egg 22 days after mating, and deposits it directly into her pouch. An egg weighs 1.5 to 2 grams (0.05 to 0.07 oz) and is about 1.4 centimetres (0.55 in) long. While hatching, the baby echidna opens the leather shell with a reptile-like egg tooth. Hatching takes place after 10 days of gestation; the young echidna, called a puggle, born larval and fetus-like, then sucks milk from the pores of the two milk patches (monotremes have no teats) and remains in the pouch for 45 to 55 days, at which time it starts to develop spines. The mother digs a nursery burrow and deposits the young, returning every five days to suckle it until it is weaned at seven months. Puggles will stay within their mother's den for up to a year before leaving.

A short-beaked echidna building a defensive burrow in French Island National Park (43 seconds)

Male echidnas have a four-headed penis. During mating, the heads on one side "shut down" and do not grow in size; the other two are used to release semen into the female's two-branched reproductive tract. Each time it copulates, it uses the pair of heads opposite those it used the previous time. When not in use, the penis is retracted inside a preputial sac in the cloaca. The male echidna's penis is 7 centimetres (2.8 in) long when erect, and its shaft is covered with penile spines. These may be used to induce ovulation in the female.

It is a challenge to study the echidna in its natural habitat, and they show no interest in mating while in captivity. Prior to 2007, no one had ever seen an echidna ejaculate. There have been previous attempts, trying to force the echidna to ejaculate through the use of electrically stimulated ejaculation in order to obtain semen samples but this has only resulted in the penis swelling. Breeding season begins in late June and extends through September. During mating season, a female may be followed by a line or "train" of up to ten males, the youngest trailing last, and some males switching between lines.

== Threats ==
Echidnas are very timid. When frightened, they attempt to partially bury themselves and curl into a ball similar to a hedgehog. Strong front arms allow echidnas to dig in and hold fast against a predator pulling them from the hole.

Their many predators include feral cats, foxes, domestic dogs, and goannas. Snakes pose a large threat when they slither into echidna burrows and prey on the spineless young puggles.

They are easily stressed and injured by handling. Some ways to help echidnas include picking up litter, causing less pollution, planting vegetation for shelter, supervising pets, reporting hurt echidnas, and leaving them undisturbed.

== Evolution ==
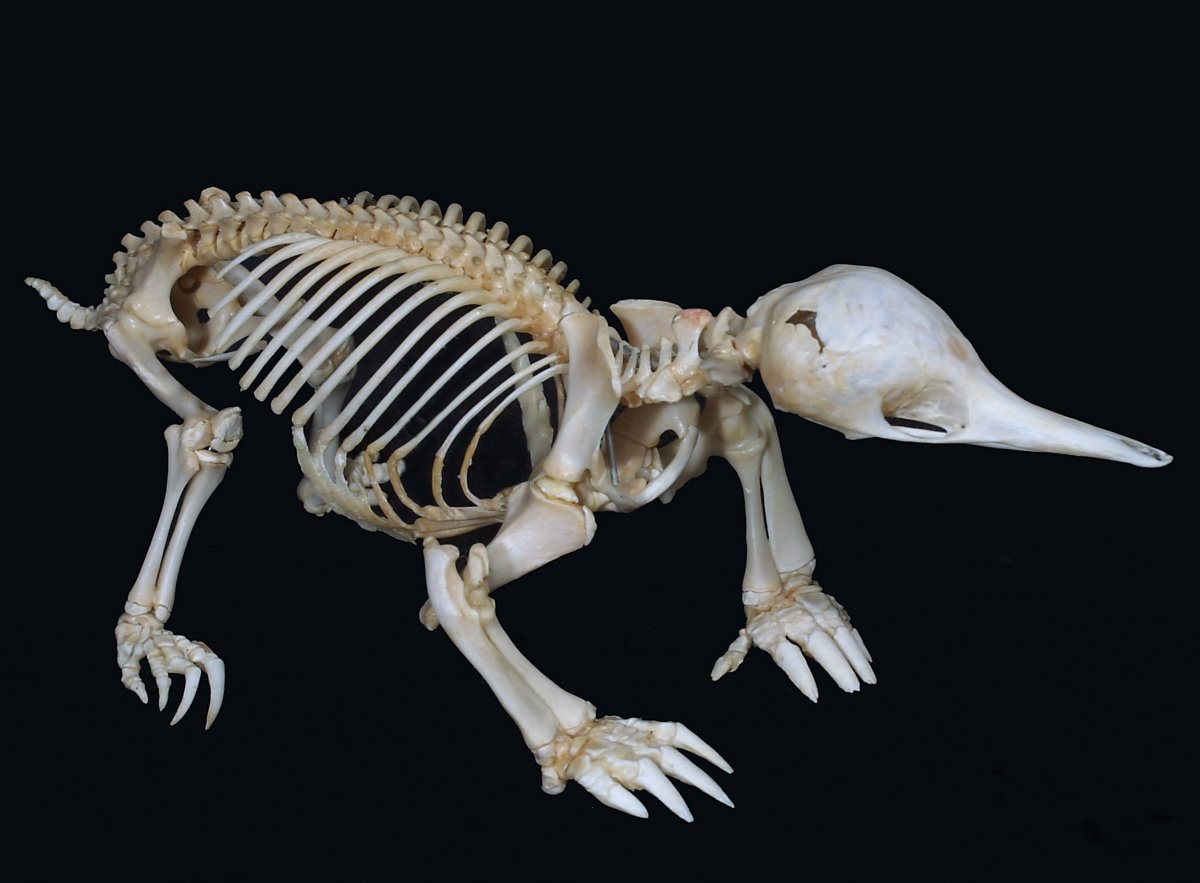
Short-beaked echidna skeleton

The divergence between oviparous (egg-laying) and viviparous (offspring develop internally) mammals is believed to date to the Triassic period. Most findings from genetics studies (especially of nuclear genes) are in agreement with the palaeontological dating, but some other evidence, like mitochondrial DNA, give slightly different dates.

Molecular clock data suggest echidnas split from platypuses between 19 and 48 million years ago, so that platypus-like fossils dating back to over 112.5 million years ago represent basal forms, rather than close relatives of the modern platypus. This would imply that echidnas evolved from water-foraging ancestors that returned to land living, which put them in competition with marsupials. Although extant monotremes lack adult teeth (platypuses have teeth only as juveniles), many extinct monotreme species have been identified based on the morphology of their teeth. Of the eight genes involved in tooth development, four have been lost in both platypus and echidna, indicating that the loss of teeth occurred before the echidna-platypus split.

Further evidence of water-foraging ancestors can be found in some of the echidna's anatomy, including hydrodynamic streamlining, dorsally projecting hind limbs acting as rudders, and locomotion founded on hypertrophied humeral long-axis rotation, which provides an efficient swimming stroke.

Oviparous reproduction in monotremes may give them an advantage over marsupials in some environments. Their observed adaptive radiation contradicts the assumption that monotremes are frozen in morphological and molecular evolution.

It has been suggested that echidnas originally evolved in New Guinea when it was isolated from Australia and from marsupials. This would explain their rarity in the fossil record, their abundance in present times in New Guinea, and their original adaptation to terrestrial niches, presumably without competition from marsupials.

== Taxonomy ==
Cladogram of Tachyglossidae by Upham et al. 2019

- Tachyglossidae
  - Tachyglossus aculeatus
  - - Zaglossus
      - Z. bartoni
      - - Z. attenboroughi
        - Z. bruijnii

Echidnas are a small clade with two extant genera and four species. The genus Zaglossus includes three extant and two fossil species, with only one extant species from the genus Tachyglossus.

=== Zaglossus ===
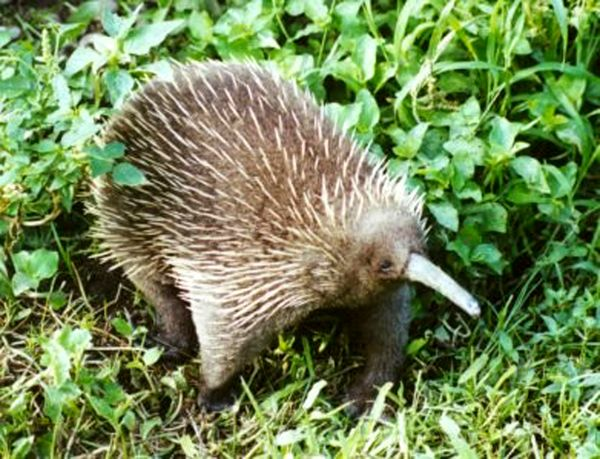
The Western long-beaked echidna, which is endemic to New Guinea

The three living Zaglossus species are endemic to New Guinea. They are rare and are hunted for food. They forage in leaf litter on the forest floor, eating earthworms and insects. The species are

- Western long-beaked echidna (Z. bruijni), of the highland forests;
- Sir David's long-beaked echidna (Z. attenboroughi), discovered by Western science in 1961 (described in 1998) and preferring a still higher habitat;
- Eastern long-beaked echidna (Z. bartoni), of which four distinct subspecies have been identified.

=== Tachyglossus ===
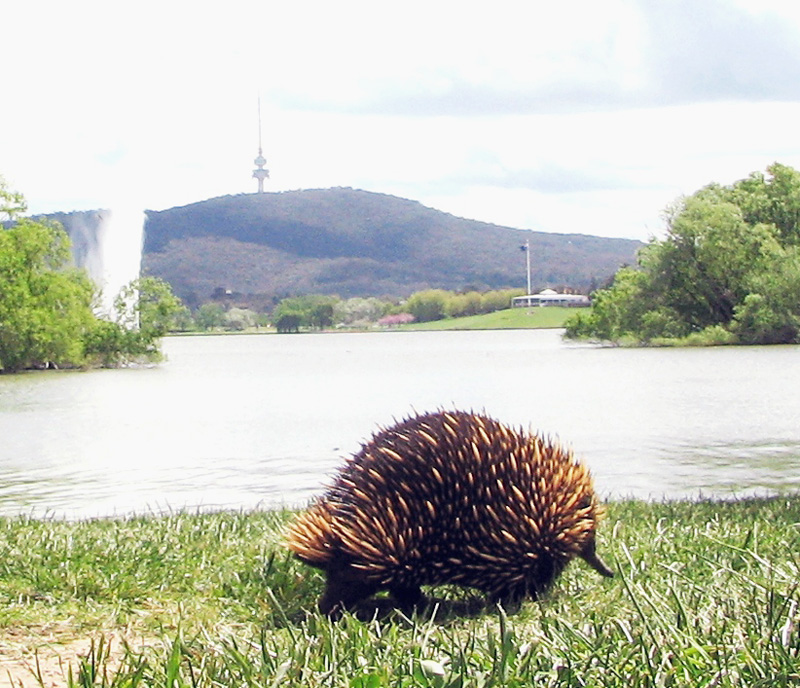
In Australia, the short-beaked echidna may be found in many environments, including urban parkland, such as the shores of Lake Burley Griffin in Canberra, as depicted here.

The short-beaked echidna (Tachyglossus aculeatus) is found in southern, southeast and northeast New Guinea, and also occurs in almost all Australian environments, from the snow-clad Australian Alps to the deep deserts of the Outback, essentially anywhere ants and termites are available. It is smaller than the Zaglossus species, and it has longer hair.

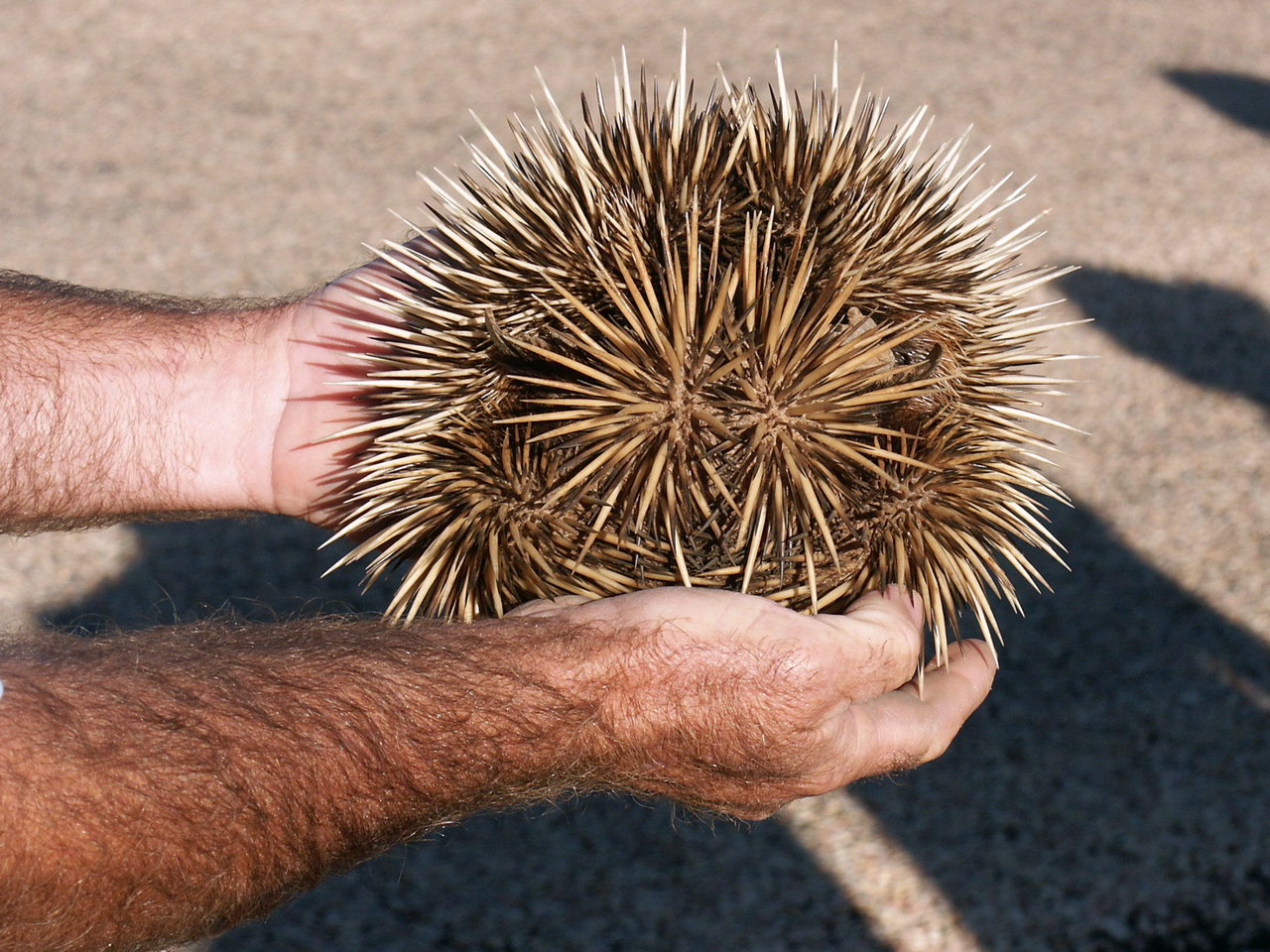
A short-beaked echidna curled into a ball; a foot is visible on the right.

Despite the similar dietary habits and methods of consumption to those of an anteater, there is no evidence supporting the idea that echidna-like monotremes have been myrmecophagous (ant or termite-eating) since the Cretaceous. The fossil evidence of invertebrate-feeding bandicoots and rat-kangaroos, from around the time of the platypus–echidna divergence and pre-dating Tachyglossus, shows evidence that echidnas expanded into new ecospace despite competition from marsupials.

Additionally, extinct echidnas continue to be described by taxonomists.

=== Megalibgwilia ===
The genus Megalibgwilia is known only from fossils:

- M. owenii from Late Pleistocene sites in Australia;
- M. robusta from Pliocene sites in Australia.

=== Murrayglossus ===
The genus Murrayglossus is known only from fossils:

- M. hacketti (previously classified in the genus Zaglossus) from Pleistocene of Western Australia.

== As food ==
The Kunwinjku people of Western Arnhem Land (Australia) call the echidna ngarrbek, and regard it as a prized food and "good medicine". (Note: Reverend Peterson Nganjmirra, personal comment.) The echidna is hunted at night, gutted, and filled with hot stones and mandak (Persoonia falcata) leaves. According to Larrakia elders Una Thompson and Stephanie Thompson Nganjmirra, once captured, an echidna is carried attached to the wrist like a thick bangle.

== In popular culture ==
- The echidna appears on the reverse of the Australian five-cent coin.
- An echidna named Millie was one of the three official mascots for the 2000 Summer Olympics in Sydney.
- The Sonic the Hedgehog franchise features a range of anthropomorphic animals, one of the most prominent being Knuckles the Echidna.

== See also ==
- List of mammal genera
- List of recently extinct mammals
- List of prehistoric mammals

== Bibliography ==
- Ronald M. Nowak (1999), Walker's Mammals of the World (6th ed.), Baltimore: Johns Hopkins University Press, ISBN 0-8018-5789-9, LCCN 98023686
