= Perixestis rhizophaga =

Scientific classification
- Domain: Eukaryota
- Kingdom: Animalia
- Phylum: Arthropoda
- Class: Insecta
- Order: Lepidoptera
- Family: Xyloryctidae
- Genus: Perixestis
- Species: P. rhizophaga

Binomial name
- Perixestis rhizophaga (Turner, 1902)

Synonyms
- Xylorycta rhizophaga Turner, 1902

Species of moth

Perixestis rhizophaga is a moth in the family Xyloryctidae. It was described by Alfred Jefferis Turner in 1902. It is found in Australia, where it has been recorded from Queensland.

The wingspan is 25–33 mm. The forewings are snow white with the costal edge fuscous towards the base. The hindwings are grey, towards the base whitish.

The larvae feed on Persoonia falcata. They bore in the butt and root of their host plant.
