= John Tunney =

John Tunney may refer to:

- John Tunney (naturalist) (1870–1929), Australian naturalist
- John V. Tunney (1934–2018), United States politician
- John Tunney Jr. or Jack Tunney (1935–2004), Canadian professional wrestling promoter
