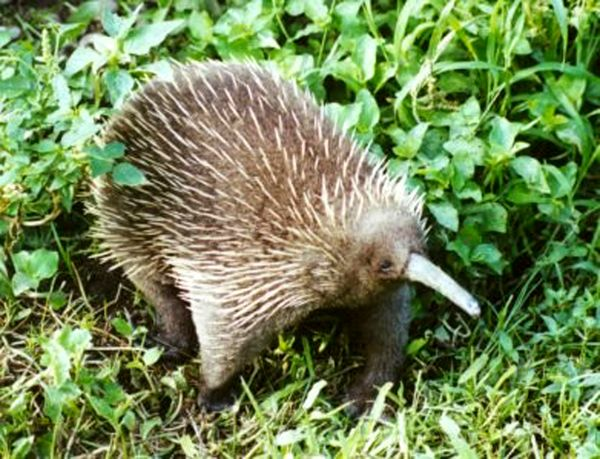
- Western long-beaked echidna (Zaglossus bruijni)

Conservation status
- CITES Appendix II

Scientific classification
- Kingdom: Animalia
- Phylum: Chordata
- Class: Mammalia
- Order: Monotremata
- Family: Tachyglossidae
- Genus: Zaglossus; Gill, 1877

Type species
- Tachyglossus bruijni Peters & Doria, 1876

Species
- Z. attenboroughi; Z. bartoni; Z. bruijni

Synonyms
- Acanthoglossus Gervais, 1877; Bruynia Dubois, 1882; Proechidna Dubois, 1884; Prozaglossus Kerbert, 1913

= Long-beaked echidna =

Long-beaked echidnas

Genus of monotremes

Zaglossus, known as the long-beaked echidnas make up one of the two extant genera of echidnas: there are three extant species, all living in New Guinea. They are medium-sized, solitary mammals covered with coarse hair and spines made of keratin. They have short, strong limbs with large claws, and are powerful diggers. What separates the 3 long-beaked echidna species is mainly location in New Guinea. Other signifying characteristics include skull morphology, color and density of fur and spines, body size, and number of toes and claws. They are a highly primitive species, with many characteristics derived from reptiles.

The extant species are:

- Western long-beaked echidna (Z. bruijni), of the highland forests;
- Attenborough's long-beaked echidna (Z. attenboroughi), discovered by Western science in 1961 (described in 1998) and preferring a still higher habitat;
- Eastern long-beaked echidna (Z. bartoni), of which four distinct subspecies have been identified.

The Eastern species is listed as vulnerable, while the Attenborough's and western long-beaked echidna species are listed as Critically Endangered by the IUCN.

A number of extinct species were known in the genus, but they are currently treated as members of their own genera, such as Murrayglossus and Megalibgwilia.

== Anatomy ==
The long-beaked echidna is larger-bodied than the short-beaked and has fewer, shorter spines scattered among its coarse hairs. In comparison to short-beaked echidnas, long-beaked echidna spines are not as heavily rooted, and so they rip out easier. Adult long-beaked echidnas weigh approximately 6.5 kg and juveniles approximately 4.3 kg. Z. attenboroughi is the smallest of the 3 species. The snout is two-thirds of the head's length and curves slightly downward. Females are generally longer, heavier and have longer beaks than their male counterparts. None of these features can determine age, and they are also not reliable for determining sex. Echidna necks are not prominent.

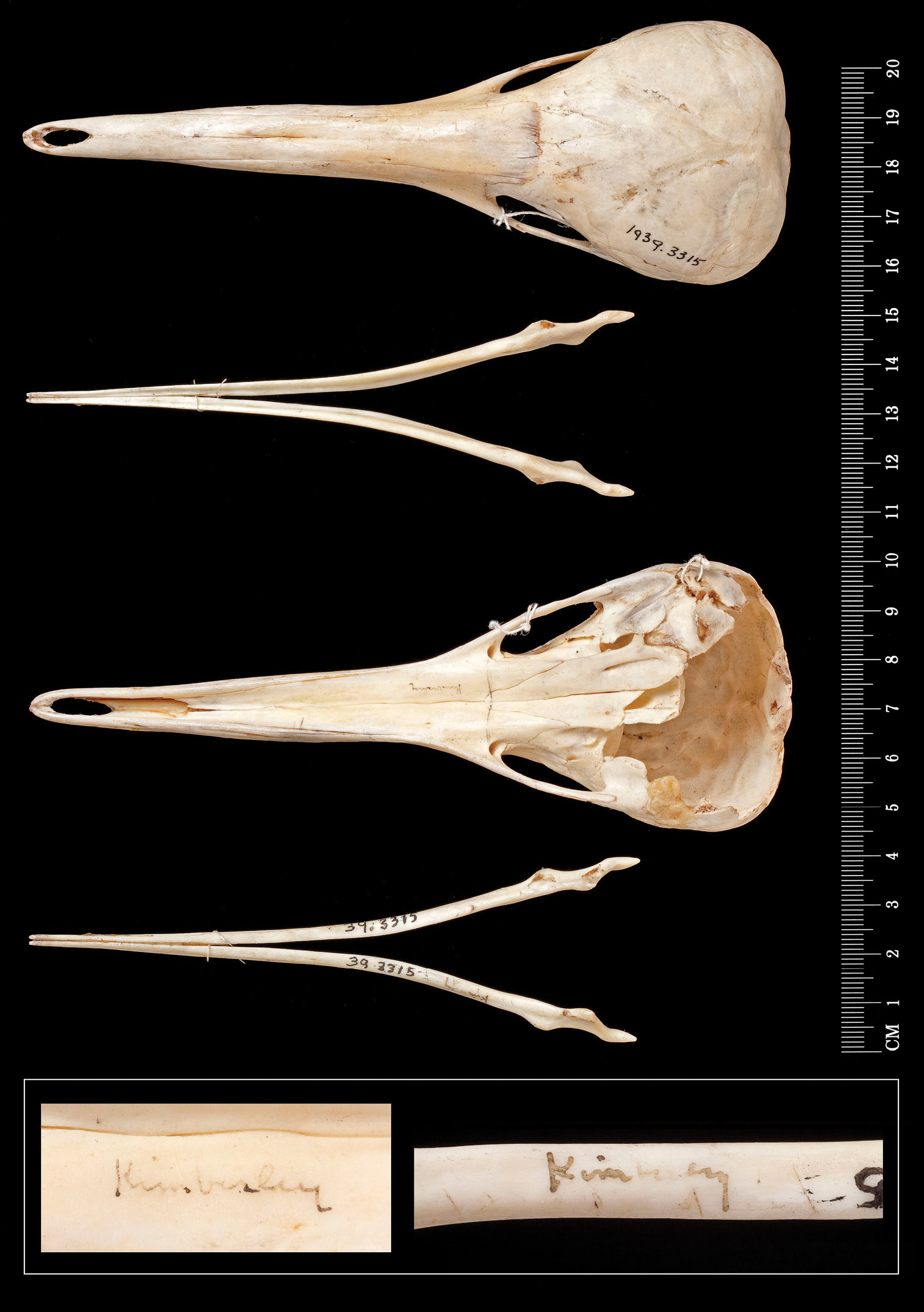
Cranium and dentaries of western long-beaked echidna

They also lack teeth, although earlier fossil records (110 Myr) suggest that they once did have teeth. Long beaked echidnas have keratinous spines on the bottom of their tongue that they use to grind and digest their prey. Echidnas are of few mammals that do not have a mandibular meniscus, likely because they use their tongue and palate to grind food, rather than their jaw.

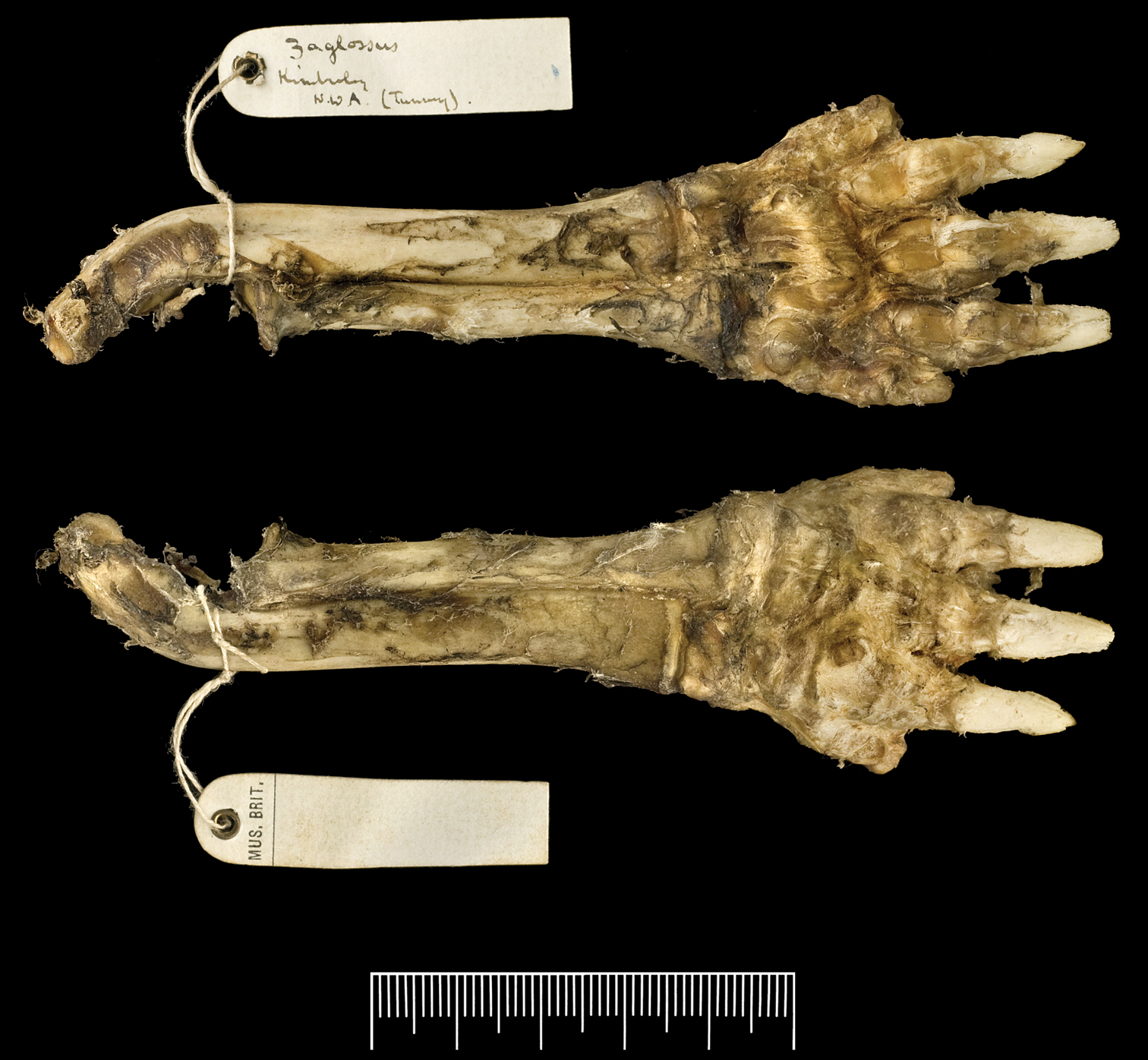
Forelimb fossil of western long-beaked echidna

Like the other species of echidna, long-beaked echidnas have spurs on their hind legs. These spurs are vestigial; part of a repressed venom system akin to the one on the platypus. Juveniles have a sheath covering their spurs, one of the only determining traits of young. Male spurs are nonfunctional and females usually lose their spurs as they age. However, this is not a reliable way of determining sex.

The Cyclops long-beaked echidna (Z. attenboroughi) and the Eastern long-beaked echidna (Z. bartoni) usually have 4 or 5 clawed toes on each foot. The Western long-beaked echidna (Z. bruijni) has 4 toes on each foot, but only 3 of the 4 toes are clawed.

== Reproduction ==
Monotremes are very different from many animals in the ways that they reproduce. All other mammals either lack a cloaca entirely, or in the case of marsupials, do not retain it into adulthood. Rather than descending externally into a scrotum or inguinal canal, their testes stay in the abdominal canal. Their sperm travels in bundles rather than individually. Their penis is only used for reproduction, as their cloaca excretes waste. Male echidnas have a four-headed penis, where only 2 of the 4 glans can become erect at a time. Being able to switch between the two could allow for more success in mating.

The breeding female develops a temporary abdominal brood patch, in which her egg is incubated and in which the newborn young (or puggle) remains in safety as it feeds and develops. Most of the development occurs after birth in the mothers pouch, much like marsupials. The long-beaked echidna has a short weaning period, approximately 12 days. During this time milk is their only source of nutrition and protection for the hatchlings; they are altricial and immunologically naive. Although laying eggs that are incubated outside of the body is primarily a reptilian trait, all monotremes are considered mammals because they lactate to feed their young. Additionally, the sex of the young cannot be determined based on physical traits.

Many mammals have protective antibodies in their milk to enhance survival rates. For echidnas, EchAMP (Echidna Antimicrobial Protein) provides young with antibacterial protection through lactation. Monotremes are especially at high risk of contracting bacterial infections due to the fact that most of their development takes place after birth, as well as the lack of nipples for puggles to latch onto.

== Morphology ==
Monotremes are more basal, or "primitive" compared to other mammals, retaining features found in many non-mammalian synapsid and reptile groups. Despite having features in common with reptiles, monotremes are more closely related to other mammals than to reptiles. Non-mammalian synapsids thrived during the Permian and early Triassic periods, before the evolution of dinosaurs. All echidnas have retained reptile-like skull features and reptile-like shoulder girdles. Although, their brain size is more comparable to placental mammals.

The long-beaked echidna's limb posture is sprawled, similar to extant reptiles like lizards and crocodilians. Although the stances between the animal groups are similar, the way the limbs move are very different between the clades. The echidna swings its limbs at a 45 degree angle while a lizard's is more horizontal. They walk with two legs on one side of the body moving in unison.

The long-beaked echidna's walk presents multiple differences from a lizard's. An echidna's walking pattern is more upright than a lizard's, this represents a pattern closer to a parasagittal kind of therian. Echidnas and therians both have a dynamic equilibration rather than a static one.

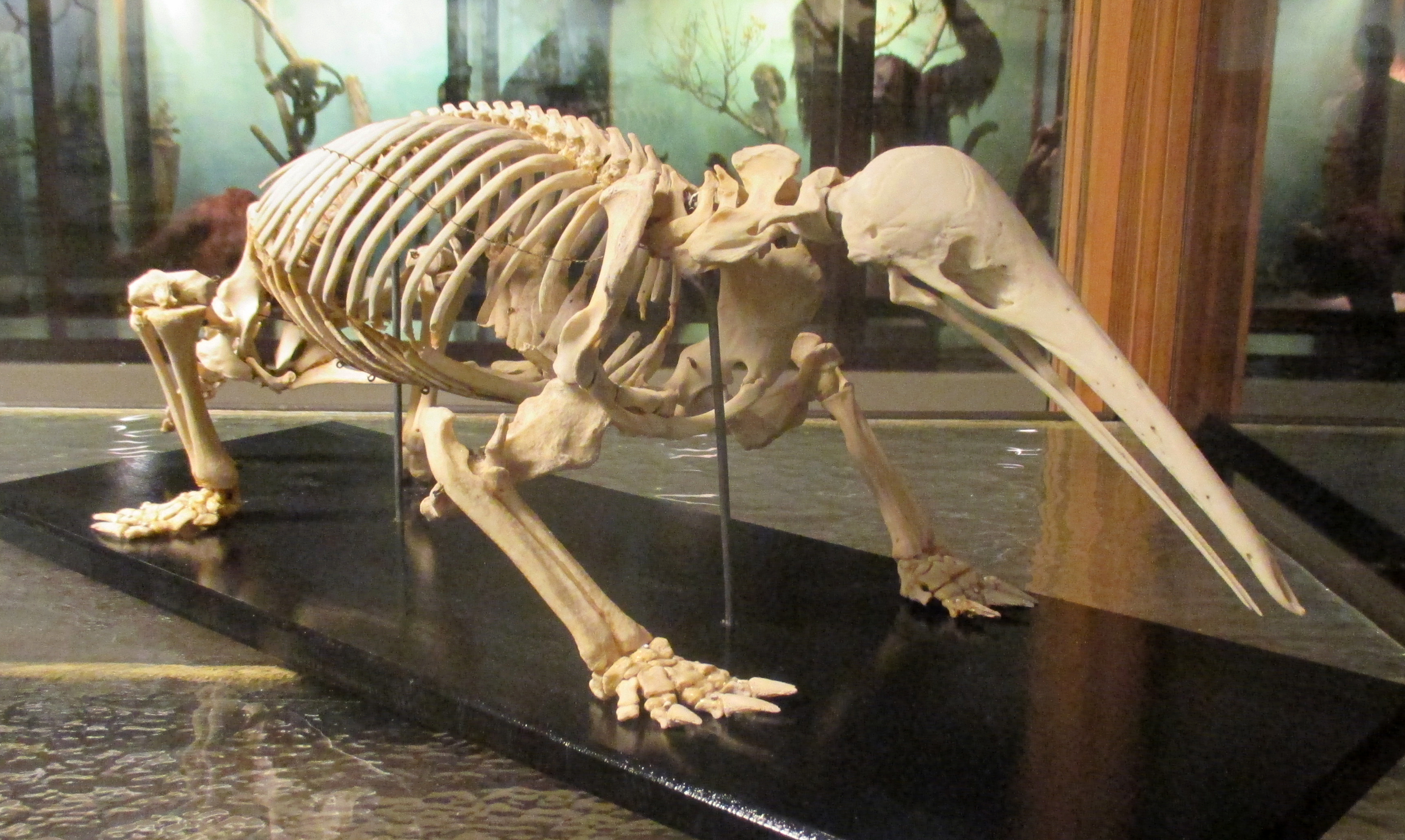
Western long-beaked echidna skeleton

Monotremes are some of the only mammals that have retained mobile cervical ribs (like reptiles). Studies have also shown an overlap in epicoracoid cartilage, which has also been found in amphibians. These studies suggest there is a possible correspondence with epicoracoid overlap and limb preferences, but further research is needed.

Fossils of extinct echidnas, Z. robustus and Z. hacketti (as far back as 15 Myr), show many similarities with long-beaked echidnas. By this time, their toothless beaks and hemispherical cranium have already been developed.

Monotremes most likely originated during the Jurassic or late Triassic periods. Fossil records suggest that the monotremes began diversifying during the cretaceous period. It is widely agreed that the echidna's lineage diverged from the platypus (Ornithorhynchus anatinus) due to the fact that platypus fossils can be dated back much farther than echidna fossils. However, the number of differences between the two species would suggest that they evolved from a common ancestor. In the beginning of the split, scientists can see that each species had developed different dental and skull features. Many believe both species are incomparable to the original(basal) monotremes. In a study done on EchAMP, it had shown that a partial peptide sequence PlatAMP (Platypus Antimicrobial Protein) was 94% the same as a partial peptide sequence of EchAMP. The study did not include the final sequence because of a lack of research done on PlatAMP. Although, long beaked echidnas are the only species that have the same diploid number as the common ancestor of monotremes (2=64). Oxford did a recent study on the genome of echidnas, going into detail of the DNA mutations that caused the speciation of echidnas and platypus.

The beak of long beaked echidnas are more slender and curved downward than those of small-beaked echidnas. The cranium of short beaked echidnas are shorter and rounder than long-beaked echidnas. Long beaked echidnas also have a more prominent occipital condyle, allowing for a wider range of head movements, but reducing the ability to lift a pry things with their beak. Long beaked echidnas have a longer lower jaw than short beaked echidnas. All living monotremes have 7 cervical vertebrae. Long beaked echidnas have 17 thoracic vertebrae with associated ribs, four lumbar vertebrae, three vertebrae fused to form the sacrum, and 11 caudal vertebrae. The iliac crest (bony ridge of the hip bone) is more pointed in long-beaked echidnas than in short-beaked echidnas. Males only in both long and short-beaked echidnas have an os calcaris bone – the bone that the spurs rest on. This is likely the reason why the female spurs disappear in adulthood.

== Behavior ==
Little is known about the life of these rarely seen animals, but it is believed to have habits similar to those of the short-beaked echidna; unlike them, however, the long-beaked echidnas feed primarily on earthworms rather than ants, as they live in much more humid environments than the smaller Tachyglossus echidna.

Their cognitive behaviors and the complexity of these behaviors show many similarities with large-brained placentals.

These echidnas are primarily nocturnal; foraging for its insect food on the forest floor and in rotting logs with their snout and forelimbs. The beaks of the attenboroughi species can leave foraging holes up to 14.8 cm deep and 6.6 cm wide. They use their forelimbs by cracking open logs and feeding on wood-boring vertebrates. These animals are not usually found foraging in the daylight. Their foraging behaviors are most easily found after rainfall.

They use electroreception along with highly specialized olfactory pathways to find prey. It is likely that long-beaked echidnas have a stronger electroreception sense than short-beaked echidnas. However, they have a very poor sense of hearing.

The long-beaked echidna establish and are commonly found in dens or burrows. Their dens are most often underground, but occasionally they will burrow at a cliff face or under deep vegetation. The latter dens are most often occupied by juveniles. Their burrows were approximately 2.7 meters long and 0.48 meters underground. They are often found on slopes, most likely to prevent flood runoff. They usually move to a different den every night and rarely return to the same den, except in some cases many years later. Burrows in use often have footprints surrounding them, accompanied by a strong scent of echidna waste.

A study published in 2015 shows that Zaglossus spp. in captivity exhibited "handedness" when performing certain behaviors related to foraging, locomotion, and male-female interactions. The results of this study suggest that handedness in mammals is a basal trait rather than one derived several times in extant mammals. It is believed this trait developed with the development of the hemispherical cranium.

They can live up to 60 years old in captivity. The Taronga Zoo in Sydney Australia had two long-beaked echidnas in their care. One female, brought in during 1963, that passed away in 2015, making her at least 53 years old. One male, brought in during 1968, making him at least 57 years old today, although some believe he is closer to 60 years old. There were many attempts at breeding long-beaked echidnas in captivity, but no efforts were successful.

== Distribution and habitat ==
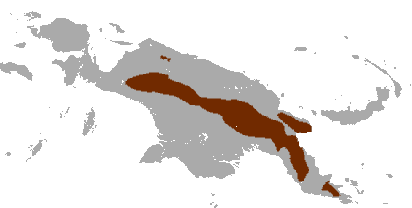
Home of Z. bartoni

Out of all the monotremes, the long-beaked echidnas are the least studied. This is most likely because they are nocturnal, elusive, and stay in areas with little human disturbance. Additionally, they have a smaller population than short beaked echidnas, possibly because the drying of the Australian climate led to the reduction of the food source of larger echidnas.

Their home-range can range from 10-168 hectares, with an average of 39 hectares. Population density ranges from 0.4-4.0 animals/km^2.

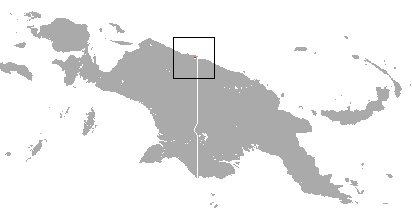
Home of Z. attenboroughi

Long beaked echidnas are only found in New Guinea and immediately adjacent satellite islands. However, it has recently been found that they could be living in North-West Australia. New Guinea is 65% tropical rainforest.

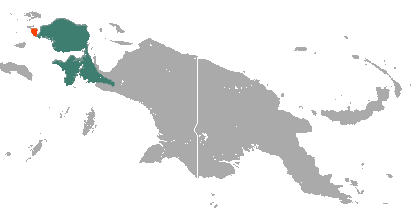
Home of Z. bruijni

The 3 species are located in different areas of New Guinea. The Eastern Long beaked echidna is found in Central Cordillera and Huon Peninsula. The Western long beaked echidna is located in Vogelkop region of western New Guinea, including the Arfak, Tamrau, Fak Fak, and (possibly) Charles Louis Mountain ranges as well as the island of Salawati. The attenboroughi species, often referred to as the cyclops long beaked echidna, live near Jayapura in the Cyclops Mountains. In the Cyclops Mountains, echidnas are found in elevations up to 1,700 m.

== Taxonomy and naming ==
Cladogram of Zaglossus by Upham et al. 2019

- Zaglossus
  - Z. bartoni Thomas 1907
  - - Z. attenboroughi Flannery & Groves 1998
    - Z. bruijnii (Peters & Doria 1876) Gill 1877

The term monotremata was created by Bonaparte in 1837. Zaglossus, from Ancient Greek ζα (za), from διά (diá), meaning "across", and γλῶσσα (glôssa), meaning "tongue", known as the long-beaked echidnas make up one of the two extant genera of echidnas: there are three extant species, all living in New Guinea.

=== Zaglossus attenboroughi ===
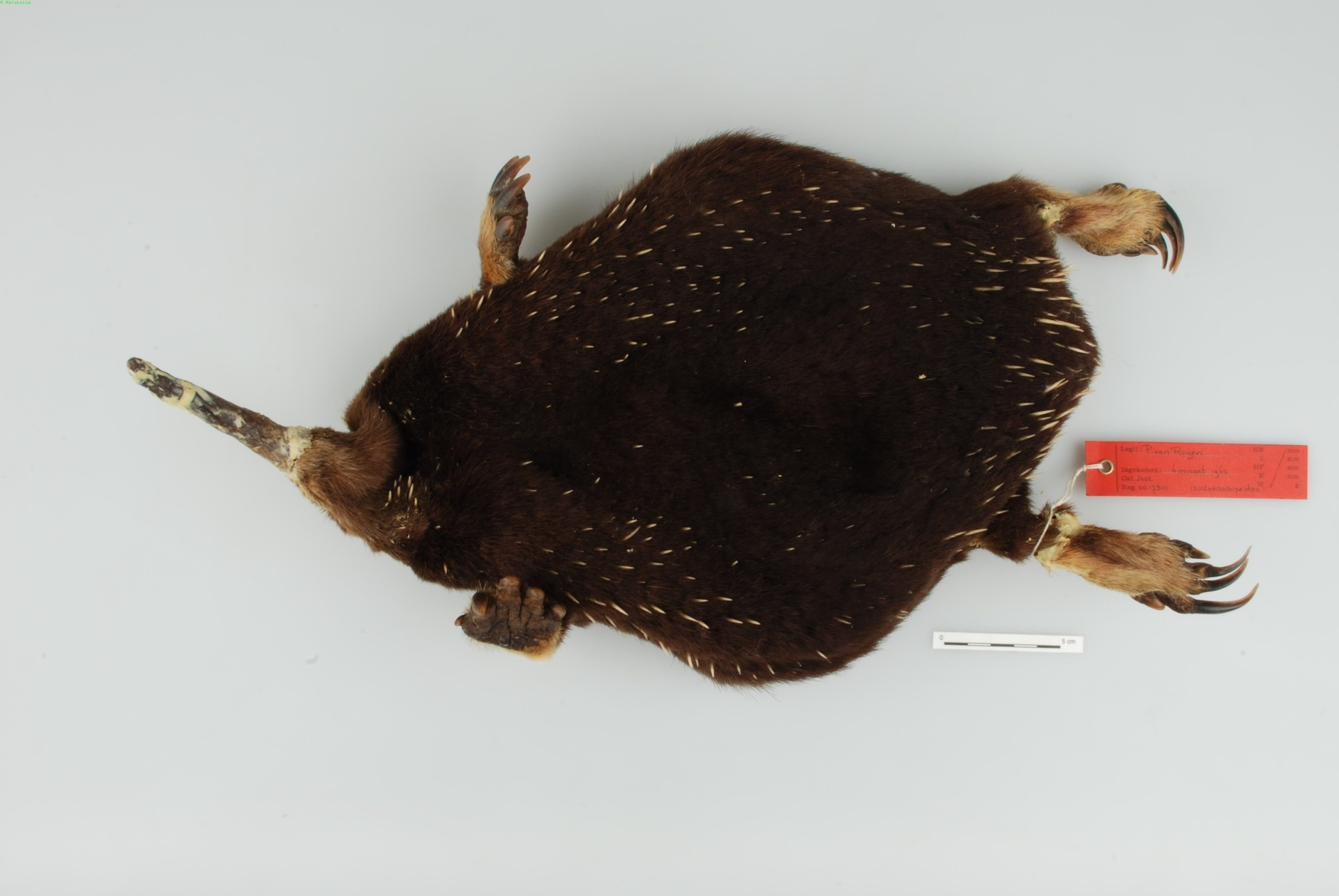
Z. attenboroughi

- Habitat: known only from the Cyclops Mountains of Jayapura Regency, Papua, Indonesia
- Period: Late Pleistocene-Holocene

=== Zaglossus bartoni ===
- Period: Holocene

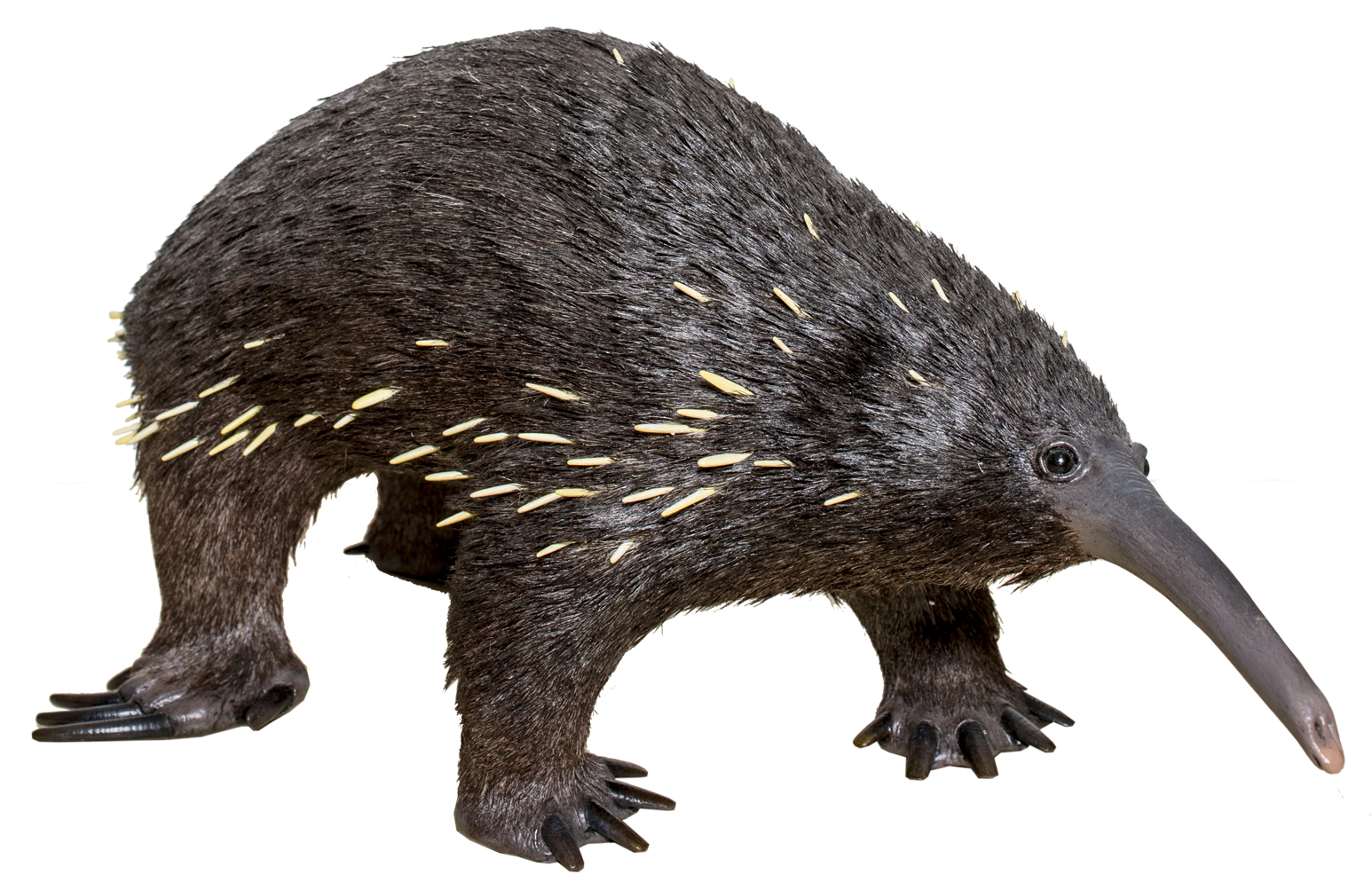
Z. bartoni

=== Zaglossus bruijni ===
- Habitat: highland forests of Southwest Papua and West Papua, Indonesia
- Period: Holocene

== Conservation status ==
In November 2023, a Zaglossus attenboroughi was first recorded alive on video in Indonesia's Cyclops Mountains, the first confirmed sightings of an individual in 62 years. There are currently 3 captive long-beaked echidnas in zoos worldwide.

The long-beaked echidna species are considerably more at risk than short-beaked echidnas. All species of long-beaked echidnas are continuously decreasing according to the IUCNs Red List.

=== Z. attenboroughi ===
- listed as critically endangered.

=== Z. bartoni ===
- listed as vulnerable.

=== Z. bruijni ===
- listed as critically endangered.

The population of echidnas in New Guinea is declining because of forest clearing and overhunting, and the animal is much in need of protection. Although, their low rate of reproduction does not help matters. There is little information on wild predators of long-beaked echidnas.

== Cultural references ==
In many areas where long-beaked echidnas live, natives believe children under 10 years of age cannot eat echidna meat, or else their physical development will be negatively affected.

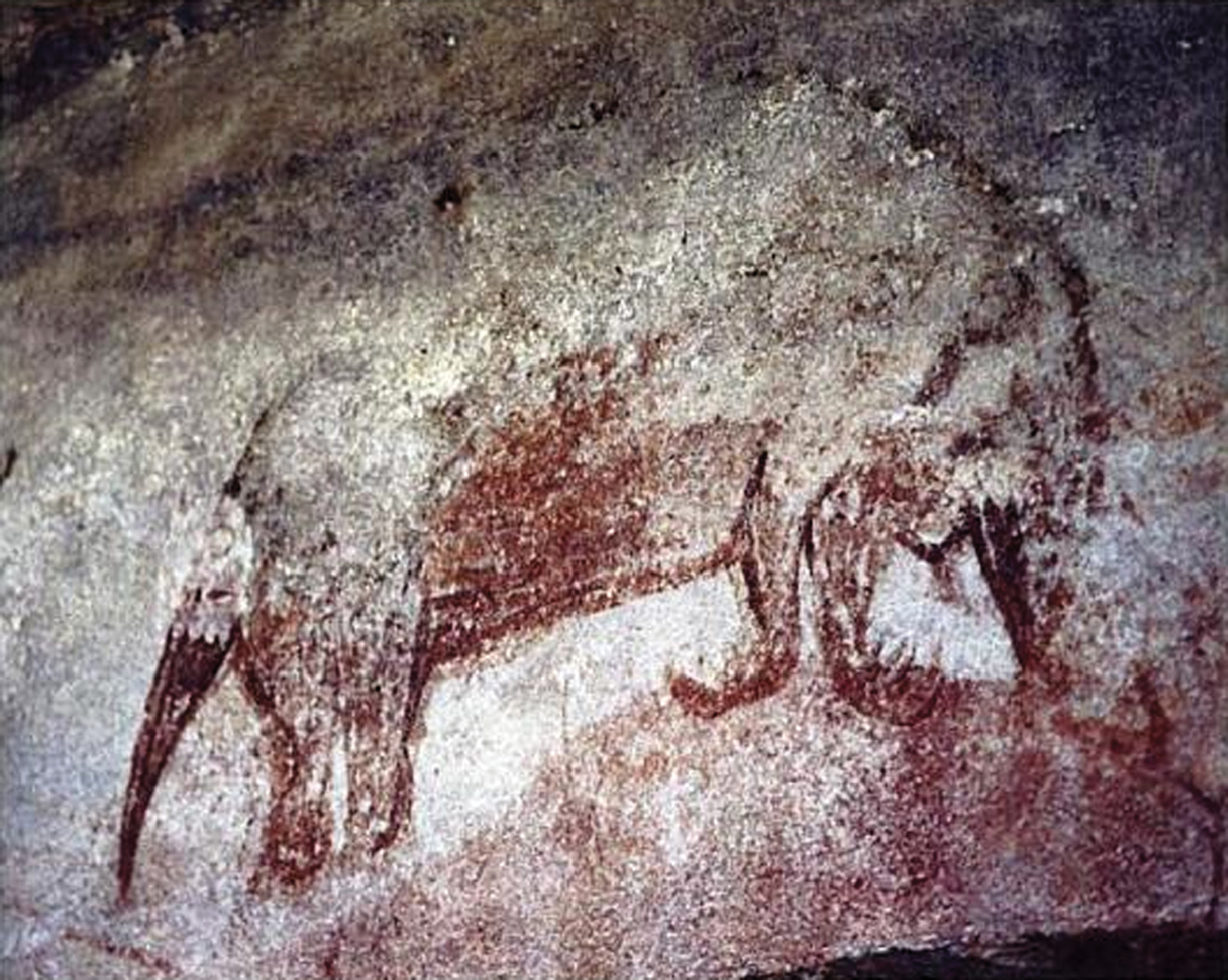
Australian rock art of long-beaked echidna

Villagers of the cyclops mountains refer to long beaked echidnas as "payanko". In Dormena, sharing a meal of echidna meat can bring peace between conflicting people. In Wambena, small-time criminals are either fined or tasked with finding an echidna. Villagers describe echidna meat as "greasy and tasty".

== See also ==
- Fossil monotremes
- List of mammal genera
- List of recently extinct mammals
- List of prehistoric mammals
