= Perixestis =

Scientific classification
- Domain: Eukaryota
- Kingdom: Animalia
- Phylum: Arthropoda
- Class: Insecta
- Order: Lepidoptera
- Family: Xyloryctidae
- Genus: Perixestis; Meyrick, 1917

Moth genus in family Xyloryctidae

Perixestis is a genus of moths of the family Xyloryctidae.

== Species ==
- Perixestis eucephala (Turner, 1902)
- Perixestis rhizophaga (Turner, 1902)
