= Perixestis eucephala =

Scientific classification
- Domain: Eukaryota
- Kingdom: Animalia
- Phylum: Arthropoda
- Class: Insecta
- Order: Lepidoptera
- Family: Xyloryctidae
- Genus: Perixestis
- Species: P. eucephala

Binomial name
- Perixestis eucephala (Turner, 1902)

Synonyms
- Cryptophasa eucephala Turner, 1902

Species of moth

Perixestis eucephala is a moth in the family Xyloryctidae. It was described by Alfred Jefferis Turner in 1902. It is found in Australia, where it has been recorded from New South Wales and Queensland.

The wingspan is 29–38 mm. The forewings are snow white with the costal edge ochreous, at the extreme base blackish. The hindwings are grey, towards the inner-margin whitish.

The larvae feed on Grevillea striata. They bore in the stem of their host plant.
