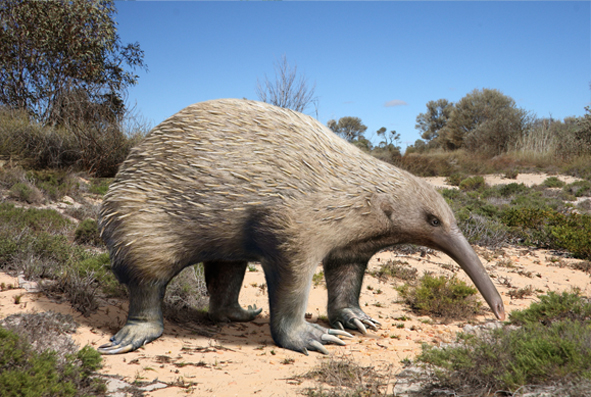
- Life reconstruction

Scientific classification
- Kingdom: Animalia
- Phylum: Chordata
- Class: Mammalia
- Order: Monotremata
- Family: Tachyglossidae
- Genus: †Murrayglossus; Flannery et al., 2022
- Species: †M. hacketti

Binomial name
- †Murrayglossus hacketti (Glauert, 1914)

Synonyms
- Zaglossus hacketti Glauert, 1914

= Murrayglossus =

Murrayglossus Temporal range: 2.58–0.0117 Ma Pleistocene

Extinct species of monotreme

Murrayglossus is an extinct genus of echidna from the Pleistocene of Western Australia. It contains a single species, Murrayglossus hacketti, also called Hackett's giant echidna. Though only from a few bones, researchers suggest that Murrayglossus was the largest monotreme to have ever lived, measuring around 1 metre (3.3 ft) long and weighing around 20–30 kilograms (44–66 lb). Historically treated as a species of long-beaked echidnas, it was separated into its own genus Murrayglossus in 2022. The generic name combines the last name of paleontologist Peter Murray and glossus, the Greek word for "tongue".

== Description ==
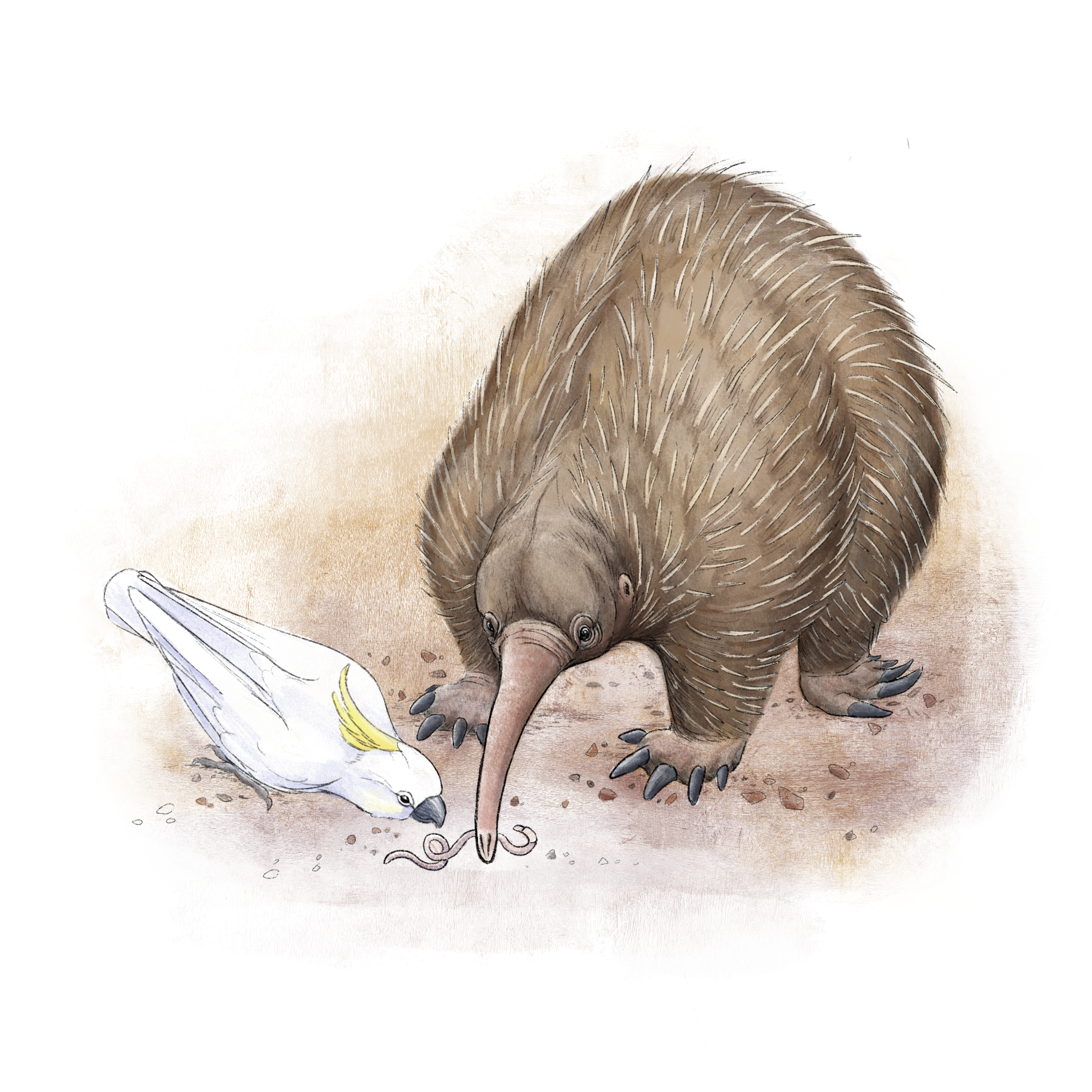
Restoration of a feeding individual

At around 1 m (3.3 ft) long and weighing about 20–30 kg (44–66 lb), M. hacketti was the largest monotreme known to have existed. M. hacketti had longer, straighter legs than any of the modern echidnas. Augee (2006) speculates that this feature made the animal more adept at traversing through thickly wooded forests. The main diagnostic characteristics of genus Murrayglossus are a set of femoral traits: a low femoral head; the very low position of the lesser trochanter relative to head (situated directly below the internal margin of the femur); the large trochanter that has a high position relative to the head; a flared medial epicondyle; and obliquely oriented condyles.

== Discoveries ==
Fossils of Murrayglossus hacketti were discovered in Mammoth Cave, Western Australia, and excavated in 1909. They were found mixed with the remains of other taxa such as Sthenurus and Macropus. Australian paleontologist Ludwig Glauert described the fossils in a 1914 publication. The specific epithet hacketti honours John Winthrop Hackett, "as a slight acknowledgement of his generous support which alone rendered the exploration of these caves possible.". The material is poor, mostly vertebra and leg bones, and the cranial material is completely absent, making M. hacketti's historical classification into the genus Zaglossus uncertain. Some of the fossils have incisions and burn marks, suggesting that M. hacketti was at least occasionally hunted by humans.

Aboriginal rock art found in Arnhem Land in the Northern Territory may represent M. hacketti or the extant western long-beaked echidna (Zaglossus bruijni).
