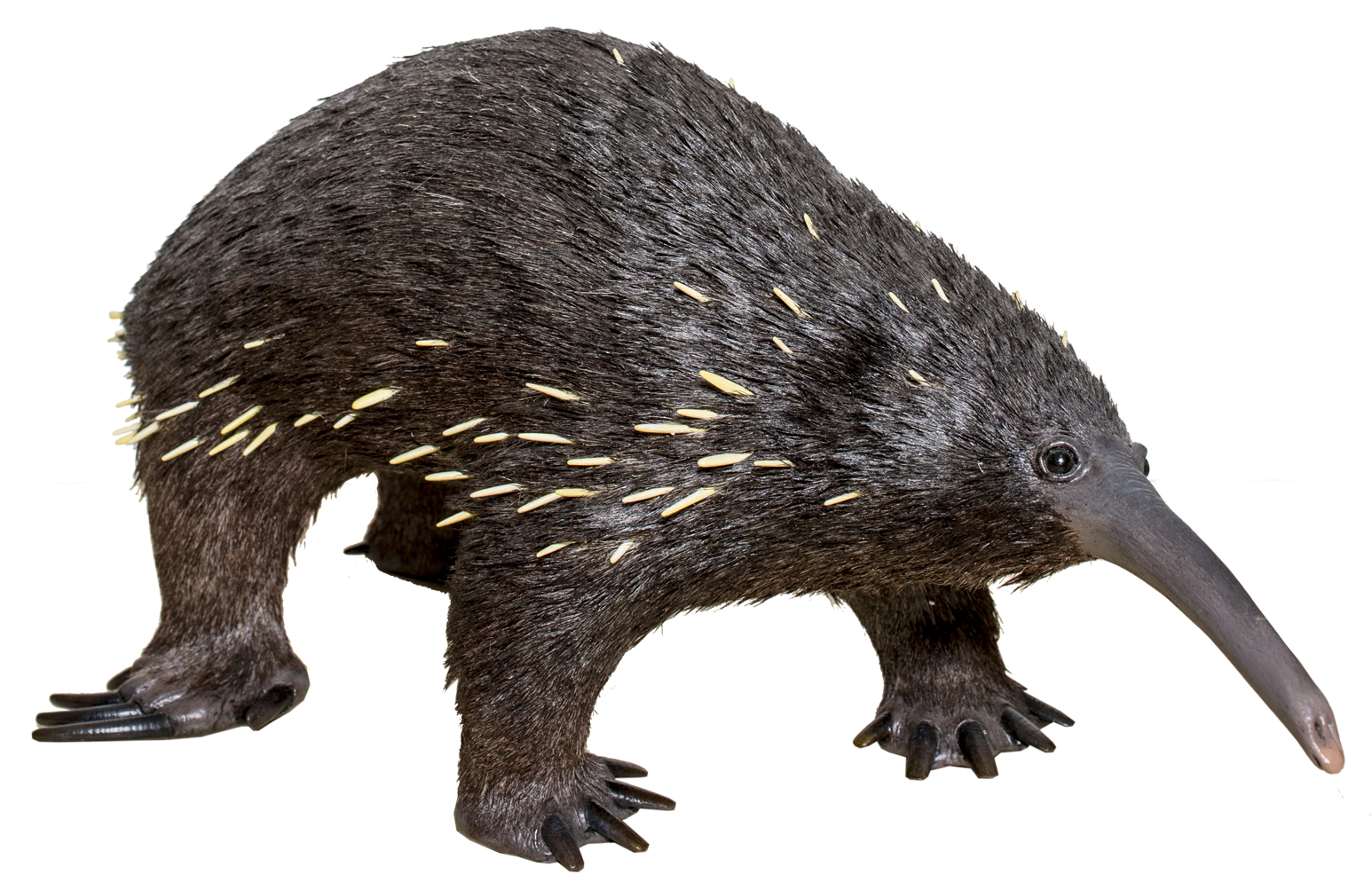
- replica at MUSE - Science Museum in Trento

Conservation status
- Vulnerable (IUCN 3.1)
- CITES Appendix II

Scientific classification
- Kingdom: Animalia
- Phylum: Chordata
- Class: Mammalia
- Order: Monotremata
- Family: Tachyglossidae
- Genus: Zaglossus
- Species: Z. bartoni

Binomial name
- Zaglossus bartoni (O. Thomas, 1907)
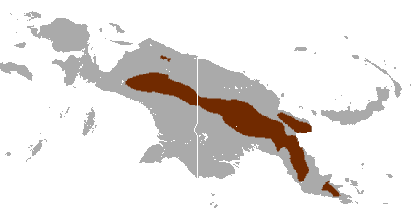

Synonyms
- Acanthoglossus bruijnii bartoni O. Thomas, 1907; Zaglossus bubuensis Laurie, 1952

= Eastern long-beaked echidna =

Species of monotreme

The eastern long-beaked echidna (Zaglossus bartoni), also called Barton's long-beaked echidna, is one of three species from the genus Zaglossus to occur in New Guinea. It is found mainly in the eastern half at elevations between 2,000 and 3,000 metres (6,600 and 9,800 ft).

== Description ==
The eastern long-beaked echidna can be distinguished from other members of the genus by the number of claws on the fore and hind feet: it has five claws on its fore feet and four on its hind feet. Its weight varies from 5 to 10 kilograms (11 to 22 lb); its body length ranges from 60 to 100 centimetres (24 to 39 in); it has no tail. It has dense black fur. It rolls into a spiny ball for defense. They have a lifespan of roughly 30 years.

Like the closely related platypus, echidnas have spurs on their hind legs. Unlike the platypus, echidna spurs are not venomous. All eastern long-beaked echidnas start with spurs on their hind feet and spur sheaths that cover them. Females typically lose their spurs later in life while males keep them. Females are also generally larger than males. Body mass tends to remain consistent most of their life, making it difficult to distinguish between adult and juvenile with body mass alone.

== Taxonomy ==
All long-beaked echidnas were classified as a single species, until 1998 when Tim Flannery published an article identifying several new species and subspecies. These species were then recognized based on various attributes such as body size, skull morphology, and the number of toes on the front and back feet.

There are four recognized subspecies of Zaglossus bartoni. The population of each subspecies is geographically isolated. The subspecies are:

- Zaglossus bartoni bartoni (Thomas, 1907) – nominate subspecies, found in the Highlands Region.
- Zaglossus bartoni clunius Thomas and W. Rothschild, 1922 – endemic to the Huon Peninsula of the Morobe Province. Z. b. clunius has five digits on each foot, rather than just the forefeet. It is isolated from conspecifics by the lowlands of the Markham Valley. The distinctiveness of this subspecies supports the high endemism of mammals in Huon.
- Zaglossus bartoni smeenki Flannery and Groves, 1998 – the smallest subspecies. Z. b. smeenki has five digits on each foot, rather than just the forefeet. It is endemic to the Nanneau Mountain Range of the Oro Province.
- Zaglossus bartoni diamondi Flannery and Groves, 1998 – the largest subspecies, and the largest extant monotreme. It is found throughout the mountains of central New Guinea, from the Paniai Lakes in Indonesia's Central Papua Province to the Kratke Range in Papua New Guinea's Eastern Highlands Province.

== Ecology ==
Eastern long-beaked echidnas are mainly insect eaters, or insectivores. The long snout proves essential for the echidna's survival because of its ability to get in between hard-to-reach places and scavenge for smaller insect organisms such as larvae and ticks. Along with this snout, they have a specific evolutionary adaptation in their tongues for snatching up various earthworms, which are its main type of food source.

Zaglossus bartoni habitats include tropical hill forests to sub-alpine forests, upland grasslands and scrub. The species has been found in locations up to an elevation of around 4,150 m (that is, the highest elevations available on New Guinea).

Zaglossus bartoni is currently listed as "vulnerable" on the Red List, improved from "critically endangered" until 2016. Deforestation is one of the factors leading to the decline of this species.

Humans are the main factor in diminishing populations of eastern long-beaked echidnas. Locals in areas surrounding regions that these organisms inhabit often prey upon them for food. Feral dogs are known to occasionally consume this species. These mammals dig burrows, providing some protection from predation. Factors of deforestation also impact this species negatively. There are four isolated subspecies that inhabit specific geographical regions.

== Reproduction ==
The eastern long-beaked echidna is a member of the order Monotremata. Although monotremes have some of the same mammal features such as hair and mammary glands, they do not give birth to live young, but lay eggs. Like birds and reptiles, monotremes have a single opening, the cloaca. The cloaca allows for the passage of urine and feces, the transmission of sperm, and the laying of eggs.

Little is actually known about the breeding behaviors of this animal, due to the difficulty of finding and tracking specimens. The way the spines on the echidna lie make it difficult to attach tracking devices, in addition to the difficulty in finding the animals themselves, as they are mainly nocturnal.
