= John Tunney (naturalist) =

Australian naturalist

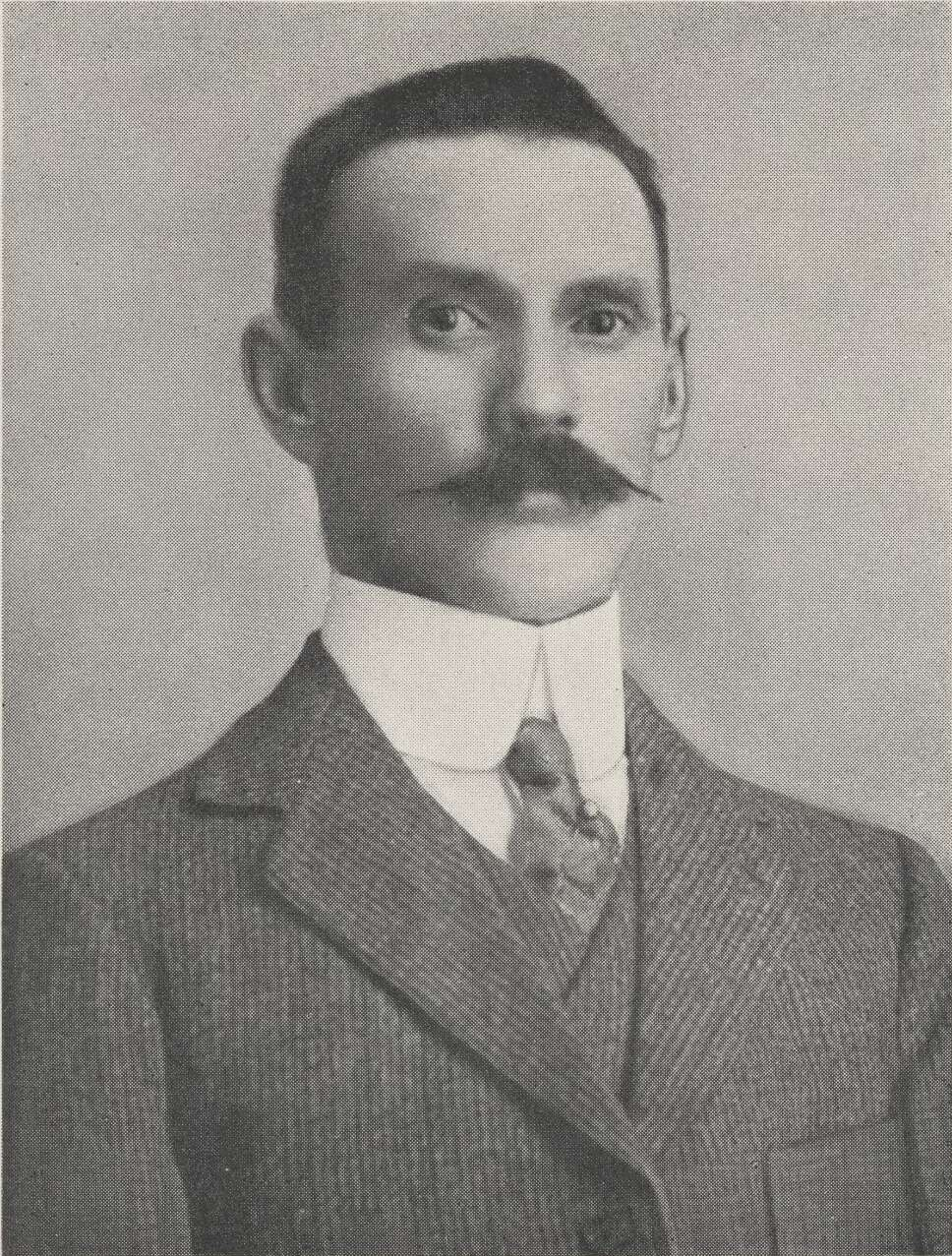
John T. Tunney

John Thomas Tunney (1870–1929) was a naturalist and collector of animal specimens, active in the west and north of Australia.

== Biography ==
Tunney was born 11 October 1870 in Kojonup, Western Australia and educated in Albany. His mother and father were Mary and James Tunney. He worked for the Post Office as a messenger, in a construction gang, and joined survey parties operating in remote regions of the state. He died near Kojonup on 10 June 1929.

Before his death, Tunney was reported to have requested that his family destroy his diaries and that was his wish was fulfilled, however, the letters between Tunney and the museum's director allow some insights into his field work.

== Works ==
Tunney began collecting for the Western Australian Museum in 1895 and continued for almost twenty years. He had been given a letter of reference from the cousin of the museum's director, Bernard Woodward, a geologist who he had met while surveying. The museum's taxidermist, O. Lipfert, taught him the art of preserving skins of mammals and birds for their collection. He also was commissioned to supply specimens of moths and butterflies for Nathan Rothschild at the Tring Museum and Syphonaptera to an authority on fleas, Victor Rothschild. Tunney's first expeditions were to the Southwest of the state, later traveling to the Northwest, Kimberley region, and across the North to Arnhem Land. Many of the specimens he collected were unknown to science, and his name was commemorated in the descriptions of these. These include new taxa by the ornithologist G. M. Mathews, and the accolades of authors such as Oldfield Thomas when naming Rattus tunneyi. Amongst the specimens he collected was an echidna, later identified as the western long-beaked echidna Zaglossus bruijnii. A later paper concluded that there had been a label switch and Tunney actually collected a short-beaked echidna Tachyglossus aculeatus.

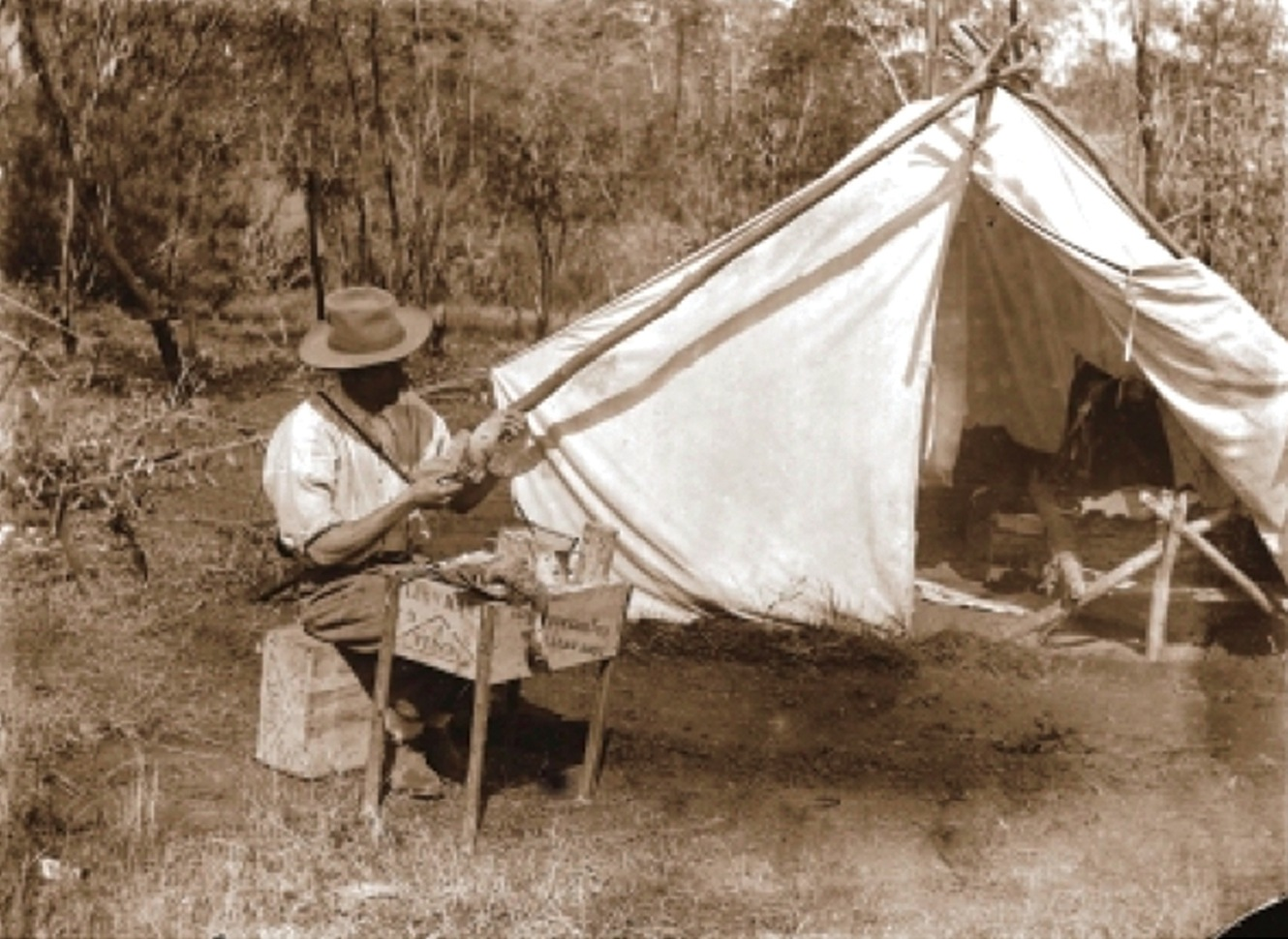
Tunney in front of tent

Woodward loosely instructed Tunney to gather cultural material of the Aboriginal peoples, encountered while he was obtaining biological specimens, and the 'John Tunney Collection' became the foundation of the museum's records and exhibits of the local inhabitants. The methods of collection were not specified by Woodward or recorded by Tunney and this amounted to an indiscriminate and casually assembled series of objects. Tunney was untrained and inexperienced in science or anthropology, beyond his employment and obvious care as a biological collector, and did not continue to contribute to this area of research.
