= William Sutherland Dun =

William Sutherland Dun (1 July 1868 – 7 October 1934) was an Australian palaeontologist, geologist and president of the Royal Society of New South Wales.

Dun was the son of Major Percy Henderson Dun, formerly of the East India Company's army, and his wife Catherine Eliza Jane, née Duncan, and was born at Cleveland House, Cheltenham, England. The family moved to Australia in 1869, and Dun was educated at Newington College (1882-1886) and the University of Sydney.

On 8 April 1890 Dun was employed as a probationer in the Geological Survey of New South Wales and was an assistant to Edgeworth David in his work on the Hunter River coalfield. In 1892 Dun passed his final examinations in geology and palaeontology with first-class honours.

He died on 7 October 1934 of cancer, survived by his second wife (Mabel, née Edgar), and four children — a son and daughter each from both marriages. His writings are in Records of the Geological Survey of New South Wales.
