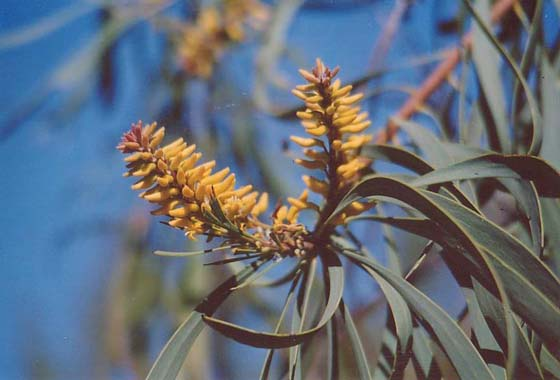

Scientific classification
- Kingdom: Plantae
- Clade: Tracheophytes
- Clade: Angiosperms
- Clade: Eudicots
- Order: Proteales
- Family: Proteaceae
- Genus: Persoonia
- Species: P. falcata

Binomial name
- Persoonia falcata R.Br.
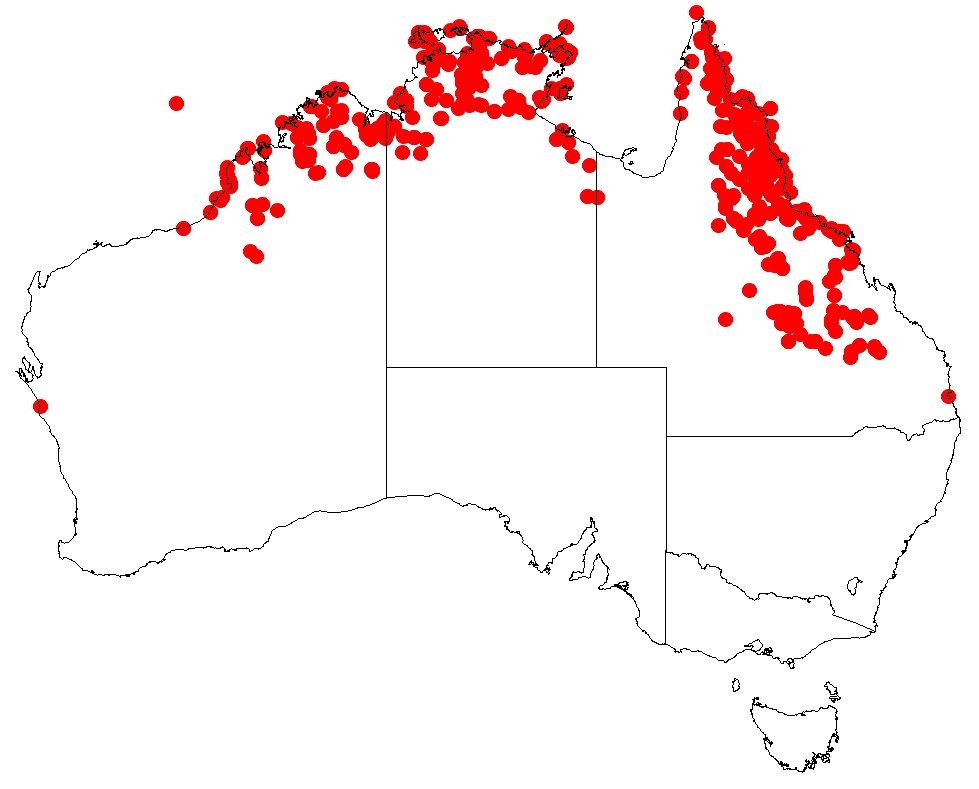
- Occurrence data from Australasian Virtual Herbarium

Synonyms
- Linkia falcata (R.Br.) Kuntze; Persoonia mimosoides A.Cunn. ex Benth.

= Persoonia falcata =

Wild pear

Species of shrub

Persoonia falcata, commonly known as the wild pear, is a shrub native to northern Australia.

== Taxonomy ==
The species was first formally described by Scottish botanist Robert Brown in 1810 in his paper, On the natural order of plants called Proteaceae, having been collected at Endeavour River, in what is now north Queensland. Its species name is the Latin adjective falcata "sickle-shaped", from falx "sickle", and refers to the shape of the leaves.

In 1870, George Bentham published the first infrageneric arrangement of Persoonia in Volume 5 of his landmark Flora Australiensis. He divided the genus into three sections, placing P. falcata into the otherwise wholly Western Australian P. sect. Pycnostyles. The 1995 Flora of Australia revision of the genus saw it classified in the Teretifolia group, along with nine species from southwest Western Australia. These species have very short tepals compared with other persoonias.

In their Enindhilyagwa language, the indigenous people of Groote Eylandt call the species awulka. The people of Yirrkala, who use the Rirratjingu language, call it dangapa, and in the Bininj Kunwok language, used by the Bininj people, who live primarily in western Arnhem Land, it is mandak.

== Description ==
Persoonia falcata grows as a woody shrub or small tree, anywhere from 1 to 9 m (3.3 to 29.5 ft) high. The thick dark grey bark is layered and flaky. The pale green-grey leaves are 8–35 cm (3.1–13.8 in) long and 0.4–3 cm (0.16–1.18 in) wide, and oblanceolate to linear-oblanceolate or falcate in shape. The yellow flowers appear from June to November. The yellow-green fruit, known as drupes, appear from October to February. Edible, they are eaten raw by local aborigines.

== Distribution and habitat ==
Persoonia falcata ranges across a broad swathe of northern Australia, generally within 300 km (190 mi) of the coastline. In the northwest of Western Australia it is found in the Great Sandy Desert and vicinity of Broome, eastwards across the Northern Territory into northern Queensland, with the Blackdown Tableland marking the southeastern limit of its range.

It grows along watercourses, gorges and sandstone outcrops, generally on sandstone-based or alluvial soils. It is also found on granite-based and lateritic soils, and rarely clay. It grows in Eucalyptus, Melaleuca, or mixed open woodland communities.

== Cultivation and uses ==
Attempts to grow Persoonia falcata at the Royal Botanic Gardens of Sydney and Melbourne have failed, as plants planted into soil have perished. Aborigines would use a solution infused with wood and bark as an eye wash, and drink an infusion from the leaves to treat chest colds and diarrhoea. Leaves could also be applied to circumcision wounds.
