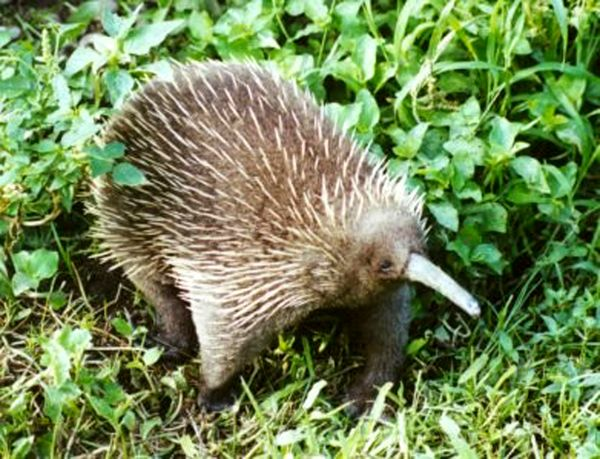

Conservation status
- Critically Endangered (IUCN 3.1)
- CITES Appendix II

Scientific classification
- Kingdom: Animalia
- Phylum: Chordata
- Clade: Synapsida
- Clade: Mammaliaformes
- Class: Mammalia
- Order: Monotremata
- Family: Tachyglossidae
- Genus: Zaglossus
- Species: Z. bruijnii

Binomial name
- Zaglossus bruijnii (Peters & Doria, 1876)
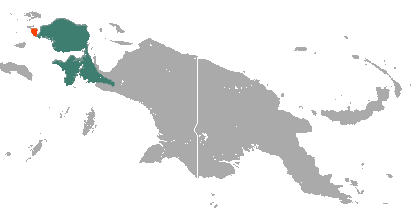
- Western long-beaked echidna range (green – extant, orange – possibly extinct)

Synonyms
- Zaglossus bruijni (Peters & Doria, 1876 [orth. error]; Bruynia tridactyla Dubois, 1882; Proechidna villosissima Dubois, 1884; Proechidna nigroaculeata Rothschild, 1892; Acanthoglossus goodfellowi O. Thomas, 1907; Zaglossus bruijnii gularis Rothschild, 1922; Zaglossus bruijnii pallidus Rothschild, 1922

= Western long-beaked echidna =

Species of monotreme

The western long-beaked echidna (Zaglossus bruijnii), also called Bruijin's long-beaked echidna, is one of the four extant echidnas and one of three species of Zaglossus that occurs in New Guinea. Originally described as Tachyglossus bruijnii, this is the type species of Zaglossus.

== Description ==
The western long-beaked echidna is an egg-laying mammal. Unlike the short-beaked echidna, which eats ants and termites, the long-beaked species eats earthworms. The long-beaked echidna is also larger than the short-beaked species, reaching up to 16.5 kilograms (36 lb); the snout is longer and turns downward; and the spines are almost indistinguishable from the long fur. It is distinguished from the other Zaglossus species by the number of claws on the fore and hind feet: three (rarely four). It is the largest extant monotreme.

== Distribution and habitat ==
The species is found in the Bird's Head and Bomberai Peninsulas in Western New Guinea of Indonesia, at elevations up to 2,500 metres (8,200 ft). Its preferred habitats are hill and montane forests.

=== Kimberley specimen ===
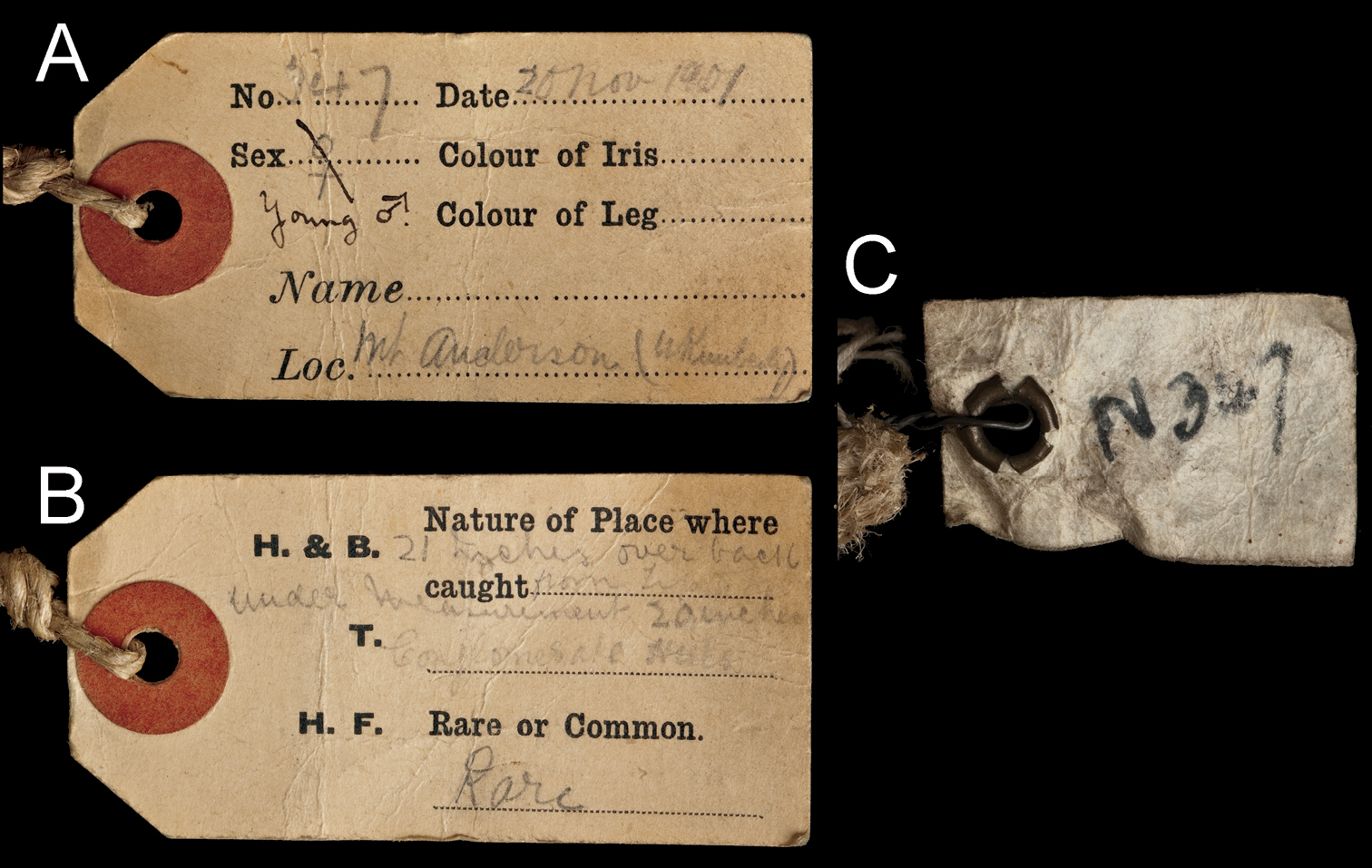
Collection label reading "Mt Anderson", associated with a western long-beaked echidna (click to enlarge)

The Tring Collection of the British Museum of Natural History includes a western long-beaked echidna, with a collection label noting its collection by John T. Tunney in 1901. The location of collection is noted as Mount Anderson, in the Kimberley region of north-west Australia. However, this species is otherwise thought to be extinct for millennia in Australia; the only other specimens of Zaglossus from Australia are fossils dated to the Pleistocene period.

It was presumed that the specimen was in fact collected from elsewhere and inadvertently attached to a Tunney collection label. Thus, the specimen received no further attention for many years.

A study by Helgen et al. (2012) examined the specimen and considered various aspects including the circumstantial improbability of a collection label misassignment, the uniqueness of ectoparasites found on the specimen, the similarity of some Kimberley forests to known habitat in New Guinea, an indigenous cave painting appearing to depict a long-beaked echidna, and the testimony of an Aboriginal elder. The study concludes that the specimen likely was collected in Australia as stated on the label. The researchers argue that the species ought to be recognised in the state's fauna as persisting into the modern era, and could potentially still be extant in poorly surveyed forests of north-western Australia; if locally extinct, reintroduction of this critically endangered species would be worth consideration.

Burbidge (2017) disputes this conclusion, arguing against each line of evidence, and concluding that the specimen is likely from New Guinea but assigned an incorrect label.

== Conservation ==
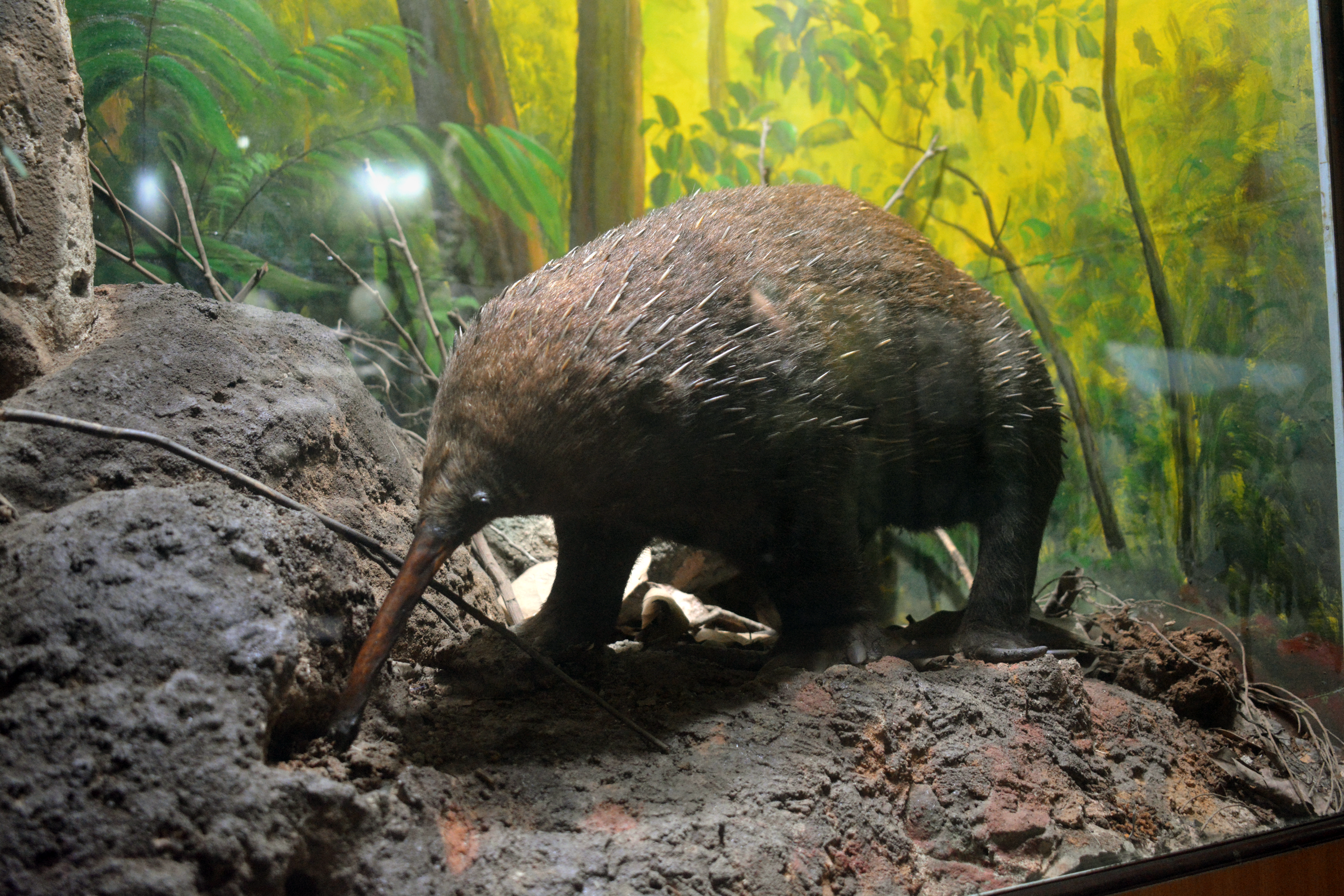
Taxidermy at the Bogor Zoology Museum

The species is listed as Critically Endangered by the IUCN; numbers have decreased due to human activities, including habitat loss and hunting. The western long-beaked echidna is considered a delicacy, and although commercial hunting of the species has been banned by the Indonesian government, traditional hunting is permitted.
