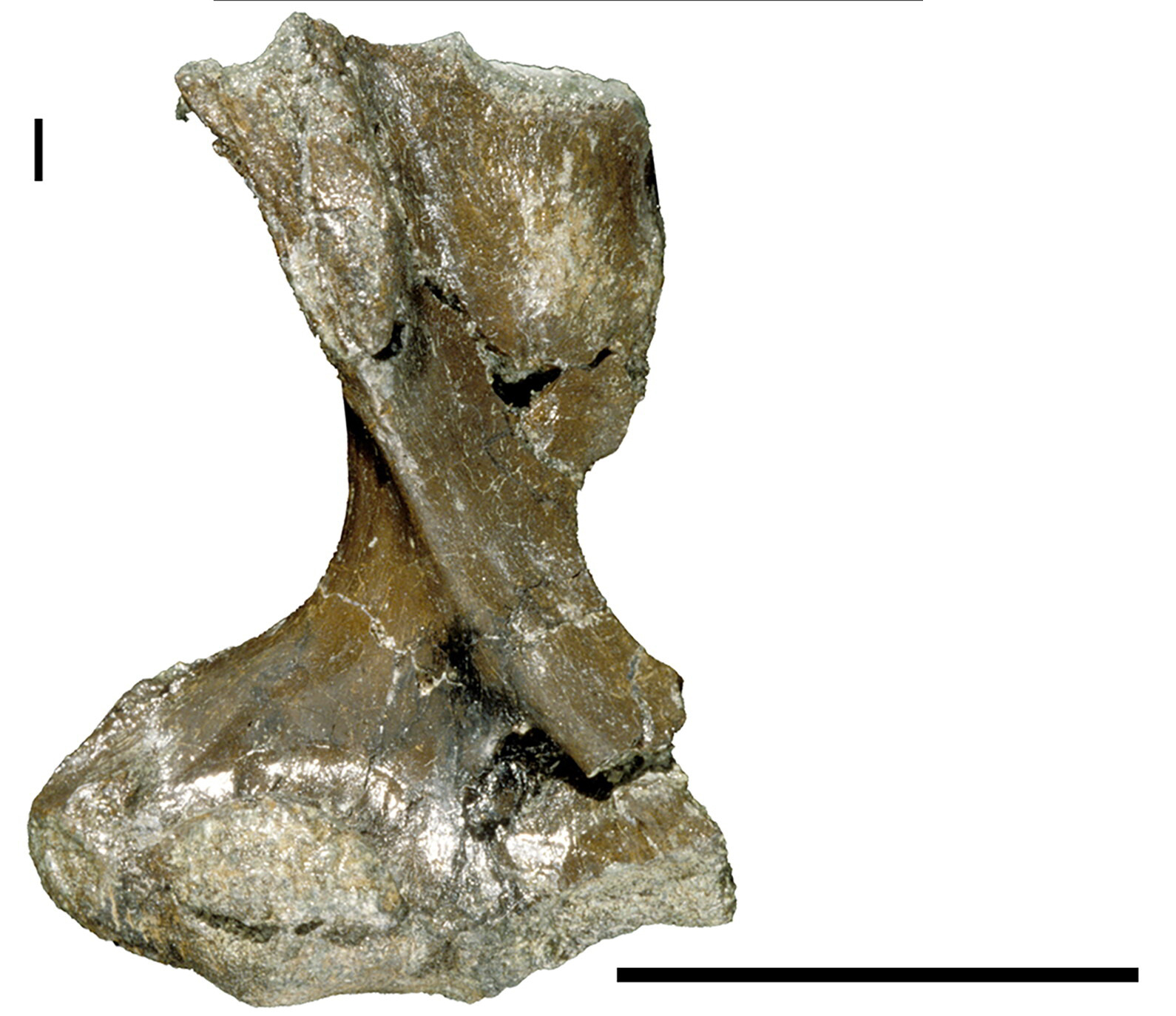
- Holotype humerus

Scientific classification
- Kingdom: Animalia
- Phylum: Chordata
- Clade: Synapsida
- Clade: Mammaliaformes
- Class: Mammalia
- Order: Monotremata
- Family: †Kollikodontidae (?)
- Genus: †Kryoryctes; Pridmore, Rich, Vickers-Rich & Gambaryan, 2005
- Species: †K. cadburyi

Binomial name
- †Kryoryctes cadburyi Pridmore et al., 2005

= Kryoryctes =

Extinct genus of monotremes

Kryoryctes is a genus of prehistoric monotreme mammal from the Early Cretaceous (Albian) Eumeralla Formation of Victoria, Australia from the Otway Group of Dinosaur Cove. It is known only from a partial right humerus, estimated at 106 million years old, and contains one species, Kryoryctes cadburyi. The holotype, NMV P208094, was described in 2005 and is currently housed in the Museums Victoria Palaeontological Collection.

== Etymology ==
The genus name derives from Greek "kryo", meaning low temperature, in reference to the seasonal coldness common to the paleo-environment of Dinosaur Cove, and from the Greek "oryktes", meaning one who digs, referring to the robust humerus from which a fossorial lifestyle has been inferred. The species is named in honour of Cadbury chocolates, referring to the dark colour of the holotype, as well as for the "recognition and support provided" by Cadbury chocolates during the field work that resulted in discovery of the specimen.

== Morphology ==
Kryoryctes cadburyi is distinguished by the authors from all extant monotremes, as well as from fossil tachyglossids, by the presence of a broad, marginated, shallow bicipital sulcus on the proximal humerus, which extends distally onto the waist of the bone. It is also distinguished by the presence of a trochlear-form ulnar articulation and a distal olecranon fossa. Pridmore et al find these features sufficient to distinguish it from Steropodon as well as other non-tachyglossid but similar monotremes such as Obdurodon, Kollikodon, Teinolophos and Monotrematum. The bone itself measures a total length of 46 mm (1.8 in), though the authors point out that it is likely missing around an eighth of its true length and suffers from some amount of abrasion, and estimate the original length at around 50 mm (2.0 in) in life.

Pridmore et al. determined on the basis of the expanded distal and proximal ends of its humerus that the animal was likely adapted for a burrowing lifestyle. In an analysis of the burrows made by prehistoric animals in 2009, Martin concluded that Kryoryctes, though the largest mammal known from the Lower Cretaceous of Victoria, was probably too small for most of the burrows in this area. They do point out that on the basis of its assignment by the authors as a burrowing animal, K. cadburyi may be postulated as a tracemaker for other fossilised burrow-like structures.

== Taxonomy ==
The humerus was first noted to be similar in morphology to extant tachyglossids, but Kryoryctes is not allied it with this clade based on a number of important elements which differ between it and all known members of the family. As such, it can more appropriately be interpreted as a stem-monotreme. This affinity was disputed in 2009 by Canens et al, which allied K. cadburyi more closely with echidnas. This analysis was rejected in turn by a further analysis by Phillips, Bennett and Lee in 2010, which found it again to be distinct from tachyglossids, though they do reiterate that there is some possibility that the humerus attributed to K. cadburyi could belong to the contemporaneous stem-monotreme Steropodon, which is similarly-sized. More recently, researchers have suggested a possible synonymy of Kryoryctes with the coeval Sundrius, a putative kollikodont. While this can not be proven due to a lack of fossil material, close affinities of Kryoryctes with Sundrius and Kollikodon are not implausible.
