= Primitive mammal =

Primitive mammal can refer to:

- monotremes
- marsupials
- sloths
- armadillos
