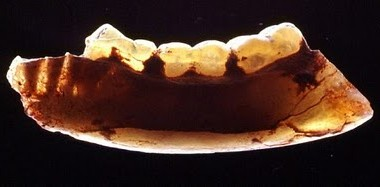
- Kollikodon dentary

Scientific classification
- Kingdom: Animalia
- Phylum: Chordata
- Clade: Synapsida
- Clade: Mammaliaformes
- Class: Mammalia
- Order: Monotremata
- Family: †Kollikodontidae; Archer, Flannery, Ritchie, & Jones, 1995

Type genus
- †Kollikodon Flannery, Archer, Rich & Jones, 1995

Genera
- †Kollikodon; †Kryoryctes?; †Sundrius?

= Kollikodontidae =

Kollikodontids Temporal range: Cretaceous (Albian–Cenomanian), ~113–96 Ma

Extinct family of monotremes

Kollikodontidae is an extinct family of early monotreme mammals known from the Cretaceous of Australia. Defining characteristics of kollikodontids include very specialized bunodont molars, which may indicate a diet of hard-shelled animals like mollusks in some species, and a somewhat narrow mandibular canal. The known genera have estimated body masses between 3.5–8 kilograms (7.7–17.6 lb).
