= Teinolophidae =

Teinolophidae Temporal range: Barremian-Cenomanian, 123–96 Ma

Scientific classification
- Kingdom: Animalia
- Phylum: Chordata
- Class: Mammalia
- Order: Monotremata
- Family: †Teinolophidae; Flannery et al., 2022

Type genus
- Teinolophos Rich et al., 1999

Genera
- †Stirtodon?; †Teinolophos

Extinct family of monotremes

Teinolophidae is an extinct family of small mammals that are among the earliest known monotremes and were endemic to what would become Australia. Two genera have been described as belonging to this family: Teinolophos (the type genus), and Stirtodon.

Teinolophos is deeply divergent within monotreme evolution, so Flannery et al. (2022) proposed to move it into its own family, Teinolophidae, and Stirtodon was also tentatively assigned to Teinolophidae in the same paper.

The skulls of the two teinolophids differed from modern monotremes. Among the contrasts are that, unlike modern monotremes, the teinolophids lacked beaks, and the teinolophids had their ear bones connected to the jaw via the Meckel's cartilage, while modern monotremes have suspended ear bones much like placentals and marsupials.
