= Teinolophos =

Teinolophos Temporal range: Late Barremian ~123 Ma

Scientific classification
- Kingdom: Animalia
- Phylum: Chordata
- Clade: Synapsida
- Clade: Mammaliaformes
- Class: Mammalia
- Order: Monotremata
- Family: †Teinolophidae
- Genus: †Teinolophos
- Species: †T. trusleri

Binomial name
- †Teinolophos trusleri Rich et al., 1999

Extinct genus of monotremes

Teinolophos, from Ancient Greek τείνω (teínō), meaning "extend", and λόφος (lóphos), meaning "crest", is a genus of teinolophid monotreme that lived during the late Barremian age of the Early Cretaceous. It is known from four specimens, each consisting of a partial lower jawbone collected from the Wonthaggi Formation at Flat Rocks, Victoria, Australia.

The generic name, Teinolophos, means "extended ridge", a reference to its tooth structure. The specific name honours the artist Peter Trusler.

Originally, Teinolophos was thought to be a eupantothere. Further research revealed similarities to Steropodon, except in size: the animal was around 10 cm long. It is often listed as a steropodontid, though it may be more basal. Teinolophos is deeply divergent within monotreme evolution, so in 2022 it was proposed to move it into its own family, Teinolophidae. Stirtodon may be a close relative of Steropodon within Teinolophidae.

The holotype is a partial left dentary known as NMV P208231. An age of approximately 123 million years makes this the earliest known monotreme. The lower molar is broadly similar in morphology to the m2 of Steropodon. The trigonid is compressed and the talonid has no basin. The dentary is about one sixth the size of Steropodon's, and wear facets indicate an "orthal" occlusion with the upper molars.

== Description ==
=== Jaw ===
The construction of the lower jaw differs from existing monotremes. Among the contrasts are the condyle, which is well above the tooth row (instead of at about the same height); and the ascending ramus, which is also higher. Also different is that Teinolophos probably had a strong bite. A unique feature for known toothed monotremes is that the trigonid is tall, while the talonid is set much lower. This is more like the general mammalian arrangement. The molar is double-rooted, which is plesiomorphic when compared to ornithorhynchids, but is a shared characteristic with Steropodon and Kollikodon. Subsequent monotreme molars are multi-rooted.

Unlike modern monotremes, Teinolophos lacked a beak.

=== Ears ===
Unlike modern monotremes, which have suspended ear bones much like placentals and marsupials, Teinolophos still had them connected to the jaw via the Meckel's cartilage. This reinforces the idea that the modern ear condition evolved independently among monotremes and therians.

=== Evolution ===
One study interpreted Teinolophos as a basal platypus.

== See also ==
- Monotreme § Fossil monotremes
