= Marsupionta =

Scientific classification
- Kingdom: Animalia
- Phylum: Chordata
- Clade: Synapsida
- Clade: Mammaliaformes
- Class: Mammalia
- Subclass: Marsupionta; Gregory, 1947

Subgroups
- Marsupialia; Monotremata

Suggested clade containing monotremes and marsupials

Marsupionta is a hypothetical clade of mammals containing marsupials and monotremes, but not the placentals. This hypothesis is contrary to the conventional view that marsupials and placentals form a clade (Theria) that excludes monotremes. Marsupionta was proposed in 1947 by the American zoologist William King Gregory and has since been the subject of multiple studies.

== Evidence ==
=== Morphological evidence ===
The majority of researchers prefer the Theria hypothesis, in which marsupials and placentals form a clade to the exclusion of monotremes. Theria is characterised by a number of common derived characteristics (synapomorphies), which include among others, viviparity (the birth of live young), the presence of teats, and several features in the skull and shoulder girdle structures.

Potential synapomorphies of Marsupionta exist only in the epipubic (pouch) bones. The two epipubic bones that protrude from the pelvis bone, are present in both monotremes and marsupials, but are missing in placentals. However, some primitive mammals, as well as fossil ancestors of the Cretaceous higher mammals also exhibit these bones. It can therefore be assumed that the epipubic bones were an ancestral trait of mammals that has been reduced in today's placentals, and that no morphological evidence exists for the Marsupionta hypothesis.

=== Molecular evidence ===
Genetic findings regarding the correct classification scheme for marsupials and monotremes are contradictory. Comparisons of mitochondrial DNA support the Marsupionta hypothesis, while genome sequencing speaks for the Theria hypothesis. Other studies do not come to a clear conclusion.
