= Peter Trusler =

Australian artist (born 1954)

Peter Trusler (born 1954) is an Australian artist known for his work on wildlife art, as well as for his scientifically rigorous reconstructions of prehistoric fauna.

Trusler's artwork is featured in numerous books and scientific publications, and several of Trusler's pieces are held in the National Library of Australia. His reconstructions have been featured on the cover of two issues of the Journal of Palaeontology (in 2009 and 2013). In 1993 his work appeared on the cover of Time Magazine, and he has produced three Australia Post stamp series. His paintings have also appeared in scientific exhibitions, including displays at the Melbourne Museum and the "Wildlife of Gondwana" exhibition at the Monash Science Centre in Melbourne, Australia.

Trusler has contributed to much original research within the field of palaeontology, both due to his work in illustrating fossil specimens and through reconstructions of extinct organisms. He is the namesake for the extinct monotreme Teinolophos trusleri, discovered on the Victorian coast in December 2000, a significant find for which he illustrated the holotype specimen.

== Biography ==
Trusler was born in Yallourn, Victoria. He studied oil painting with the Ballarat artist Jessie Merritt and graduated with a science degree from Monash University. He was a foundation member of the Wildlife Art Society of Australia.

He has collaborated frequently with many palaeontologists, such as Tom Rich, Patricia Vickers-Rich and Guy Narbonne, having created numerous artistic reconstructions of extinct animals. Through these collaborations, he has made scientific contributions within the field of palaeontology.

In 2010 he wrote on the importance of illustration to science:

"In circumstances where I have the opportunity to compare a well presented, old lithographic drawing of a specimen with an equivalent photograph, I have found that, contrary to popular opinion, the drawing can be superior ... [A] drawing is a complex synthesis of information, which embodies a hierarchy of decisions. It contains a system of weighted emphases that can filter out extraneous or irrelevant information. Drawings deal with surfaces, form and content and matters of understanding, for they are time intensive. Drawings are expressions that embody research and development. They are never bland, factual presentations, no matter how simple or realistic they may appear. The specimen's image has been considered, and not shot!" (The Artist and the Scientists, 2010)

Trusler obtained a PhD in Paleontology at Monash University in 2016, focusing on the skull anatomy of the extinct marsupial Palorchestes.

== Bibliography ==
His palaeontological artwork has been featured within the following books:

- The Fossil Book (1997) Doubleday
- Wildlife of Gondwana: Dinosaurs and Other Vertebrates from the Ancient Supercontinent (1999) Indiana University Press
- The Dinosaurs of Darkness: Life of the Past (2000) Allen & Unwin
- Magnificent Mihirungs: The Colossal Flightless Birds of the Australian Dreamtime (2003) Indiana University Press
- The Rise of Animals: Evolution and diversification of the Kingdom Animalia (2007) Johns Hopkins
- The Artist and the Scientists: Bringing Prehistory to Life (2010) Cambridge University Press

His artwork has also appeared on the cover of these books:

- Australia's Lost World. A history of Australia's backboned animals (1996) Kangaroo Press
- The Rise and Fall of the Ediacaran Biota (2007) The Geological Society of London

Trusler has also illustrated guidebooks of Australian birds:

- Birds of Australian Gardens (1980) Rigby Publishers Ltd
- Birds of Australia (1999) Princeton University Press

Trusler has only illustrated a series of Australian Stamps:

- Creatures of the Slime (2005) Australian Post

== Scientific Publications ==
A partial list of scientific papers to which Trusler has contributed:

=== Early Cretaceous mammals ===
- Rich TH, Vickers-Rich P, Trusler P, Flannery TF, Cifelli R, Constantine A, Kool L, van Klaveren N (2001) Monotreme nature of the Australian Early Cretaceous mammal Teinolophos. Acta Palaeontologica Polonica Vol 46(1) pp. 113–118
- Rich TH, Flannery TF, Trusler P, Kool L (2002) Evidence that monotremes and ausktribosphenids are not sister-groups. Journal of Vertebrate Paleontology Vol 22(2) pp. 466–469

=== Ediacaran fauna ===
- Trusler, P., Stilwell, J., and Vickers-Rich, P. (2007) Comment: future research directions for further analysis of Kimberella. In: P. VickersRich, and P. Komarower (eds.), Rise and Fall of the Ediacaran Biota, 181-185.
- Narbonne, G.M., Laflamme, M., Greentree, C., and Trusler, P. (2009) Reconstructing a lost world: Ediacaran rangeomorphs from Spaniard's Bay, Newfoundland. Journal of Paleontology Vol 83(4): 503-523.
- Elliott, D.A., Vickers-Rich, P., Trusler, P., and Hall, M. (2011) New evidence on the taphonomic context of the Ediacaran Pteridinium. Acta Palaeontologica Polonica Vol 56(3): 641-650.
- Vickers-Rich, P., Ivantsov, A.Y., Trusler, P., Narbonne, G.M., Hall, M., Wilson, S.A., Greentree, C., Fedonkin, M.A., Elliott, D.A., Hoffmann, K.H., and Schneider, G.I.C. (2013) Reconstructing Rangea: New discoveries from the Ediacaran of Southern Namibia. Journal of Paleontology Vol 87(1): 1-15.

== Australia Post stamp series ==
Trusler's work can be found in three different series of stamps celebrating prehistoric faunas and issued by Australia Post. The best-known of these was in 1993, depicting several Australian dinosaurs and pterosaurs. More recently, in 2007, he illustrated the "Creatures of the slime" stamp series documenting the Neoproterozoic Ediacaran fauna first discovered in Australia, and the "Australian Megafauna" series released in October 2008, which portrays a variety of giant extinct marsupials and reptiles.

== Awards ==
A Eureka Prize was awarded in 1993 to authors Tom Rich and Patricia Vickers-Rich for the book "Wildlife of Gondwana", illustrated by Trusler. A Lanzendorf PaleoArt Prize (now called the Lanzendorf-National Geographic PaleoArt Prize) was awarded to him in 2004 by the Society of Vertebrate Paleontology.
