= Echidna flea =

Scientific classification
- Kingdom: Animalia
- Phylum: Arthropoda
- Clade: Pancrustacea
- Class: Insecta
- Order: Siphonaptera
- Suborder: Pygiopsyllomorpha
- Family: Pygiopsyllidae
- Genus: Bradiopsylla; Jordan & Rothschild, 1922
- Species: B. echidnae

Binomial name
- Bradiopsylla echidnae (Denny, 1843)

Species of flea

The echidna flea (Bradiopsylla echidnae) is the larger of two species of flea commonly found on the short-beaked echidna. It is monotypic, that is, the only species in the genus. This flea reaches 4 millimetres in length and has been claimed to be the world's largest flea. This statement is in error as the world's largest flea is known to be the mountain beaver flea which can be as large as 12 millimetres in length.

The echidna flea is found on short-beaked Echidnas in southeastern Australia and Tasmania, and although echidnas are distributed more widely throughout Australasia, it has not been recorded in New Guinea where other species of echidna occur (Zaglossus and Tachyglossus).The echidna flea has also been recorded once on a Tasmanian devil.

The echidna flea has been a subject in several molecular studies as the out-group for phylogenetic trees of cat and dog fleas.

Evidence suggests that the echidna flea, in large infestation quantities, is responsible for a type of anemia and perhaps even a type of lymphoma in the short-beaked echidna.

The Echidna flea has similar habitat as its the echidna (the species it inhabits). This is because to ensure the best chances of survival the echidna flee must be able to sustain its host's natural habitat.

The Echidna flea is a part of the Leptosyllidae species. This is a scaled flea species that has approximately 29 Genera, 267 Species, and 147 Subspecies. Leptosyllidea typically impacts birds, rabbits, and other rodents.
