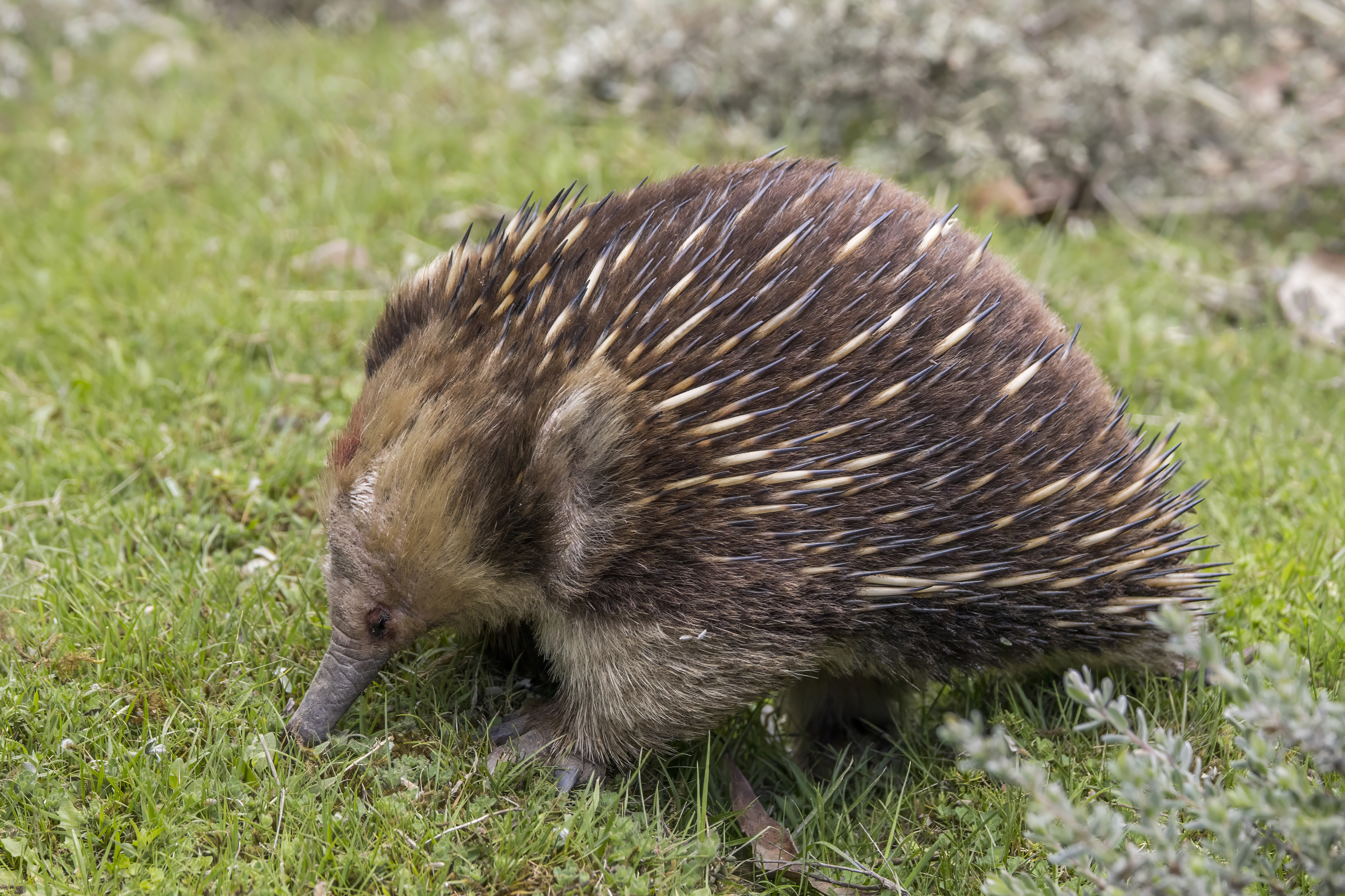
- near Scottsdale, Tasmania

Scientific classification
- Domain: Eukaryota
- Kingdom: Animalia
- Phylum: Chordata
- Class: Mammalia
- Order: Monotremata
- Family: Tachyglossidae
- Genus: Tachyglossus
- Species: T. aculeatus
- Subspecies: T. a. setosus

Trinomial name
- Tachyglossus aculeatus setosus (Geoffroy Saint-Hilaire, 1803)

= Tasmanian short-beaked echidna =

Subspecies of monotreme

The Tasmanian short-beaked echidna (Tachyglossus aculeatus setosus) is a subspecies of short-beaked echidna endemic to Tasmania.

It was first described by Étienne Geoffroy Saint-Hilaire in 1803 as Echidna setosa, from two specimens, one of which was found in or near Bruny Island. Jackson and others (2021) review the taxonomy of this animal and redefine various type specimens.
