= Sundrius =

Sundrius Temporal range: Early Cretaceous (Albian), ~113–108 Ma

Scientific classification
- Kingdom: Animalia
- Phylum: Chordata
- Class: Mammalia
- Order: Monotremata
- Family: †Kollikodontidae (?)
- Genus: †Sundrius
- Species: †S. ziegleri

Binomial name
- †Sundrius ziegleri Rich et al., 2020

Genus of fossil monotremes

Sundrius is an extinct genus of probable monotreme mammal from the Early Cretaceous (Albian) Eumeralla Formation of Australia. The genus contains a single species, S. ziegleri, known from a broken molar.
