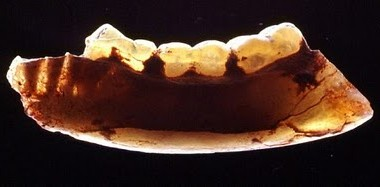
- Opalised jaw of Kollikodon (backlit)

Scientific classification
- Kingdom: Animalia
- Phylum: Chordata
- Class: Mammalia
- Order: Monotremata
- Family: †Kollikodontidae
- Genus: †Kollikodon; Flannery, Archer, Rich & Jones, 1995
- Species: †K. ritchiei

Binomial name
- †Kollikodon ritchiei Flannery, Archer, Rich & Jones, 1995

Synonyms
- Hotcrossbunodon (informal)

= Kollikodon =

Kollikodon Temporal range: Cenomanian, 99–96 Ma

Extinct genus of mammals

Kollikodon is an extinct species of mammal, considered to be an early monotreme. It is known only from an opalised dentary fragment, with one premolar and two molars in situ, as well as a referred maxillary fragment containing the last premolar and all four molars. The fossils were found in the Griman Creek Formation at Lightning Ridge, New South Wales, Australia. Kollikodon lived in the Late Cretaceous period, during the Cenomanian age (99–96 million years ago). Several other monotremes are known from the Griman Creek Formation, including Dharragarra, Opalios, Parvopalus, Steropodon, and Stirtodon.

== Etymology ==
Kollix is an ancient Greek word (κολλίξ) for a bread roll. The strange teeth of Kollikodon, when seen from above, resemble hot cross buns, traditionally toasted and eaten on Good Friday. Originally, Michael Archer wanted to name it "Hotcrossbunodon", but met disapproval from his associates.

== Description ==
Like Steropodon, Kollikodon was a relatively large mammal for the Mesozoic. The molars have a length of around 5.5 mm and a width of between about 4 and 6 mm. Based upon these data, the potential body length could be up to a metre. Assuming the accuracy of such a guess, Kollikodon would be a contender for the largest Mesozoic mammal known, along with other possible giants such as Repenomamus, Schowalteria, and Bubodens.

Aside from its size, it is difficult to say what Kollikodon looked like. It is certain that its teeth were specialised to crush food, being perhaps a shellfish-eater or herbivore. The description of the upper jaw showed that it was strongly specialised, with molars being subdivided into numerous rounded cuspules, some of which exhibit pits, possibly the result of crushing hard items.

== In museums ==
Both Kollikodon and Steropodon can be found at the Australian Museum in Sydney, along with Eric, the opalised pliosaur.
