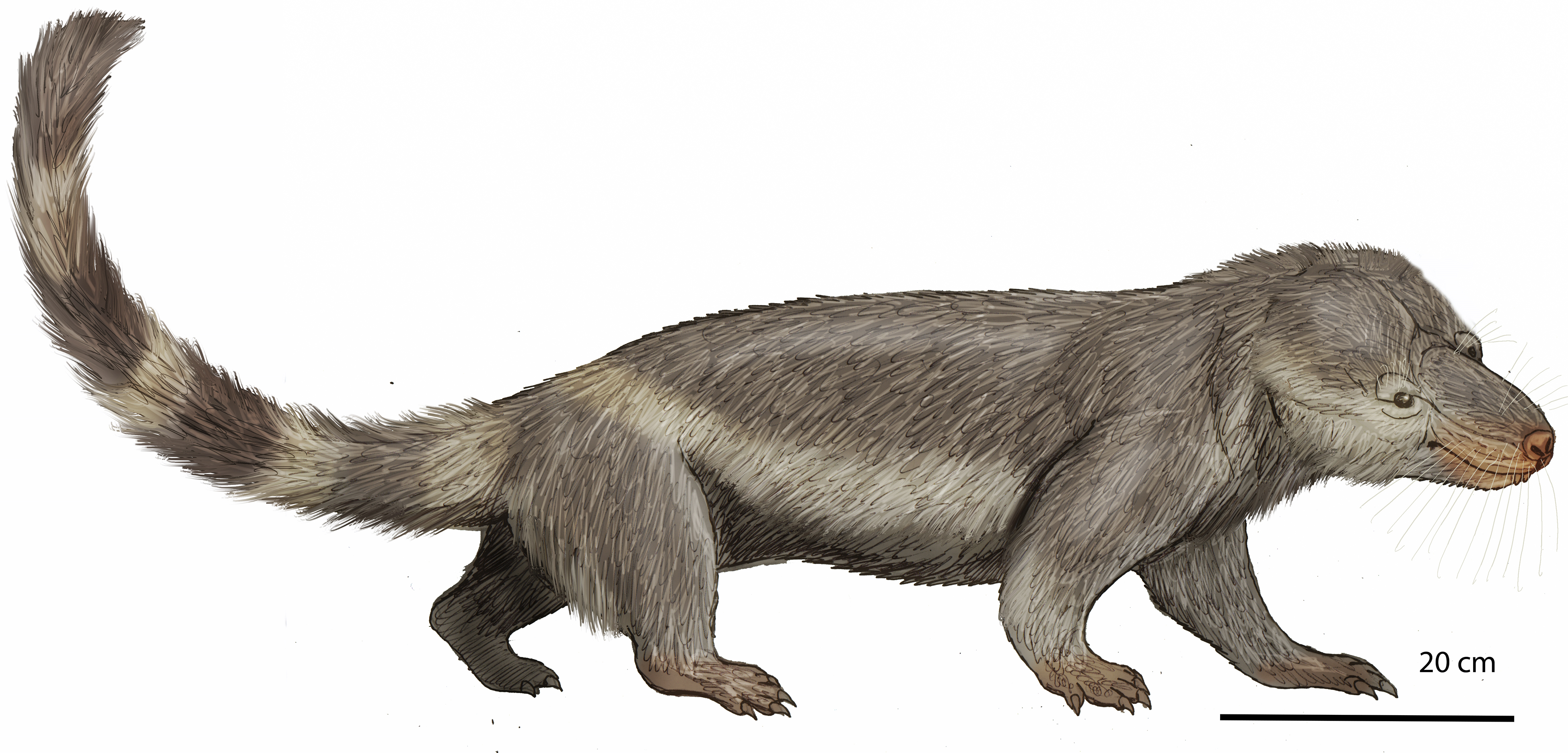
- Tritylodon longaevus

Scientific classification
- Kingdom: Animalia
- Phylum: Chordata
- Clade: Synapsida
- Clade: Therapsida
- Clade: Cynodontia
- Family: †Tritylodontidae
- Genus: †Tritylodon; Owen, 1884

Type species
- Tritylodon longaevus Owen, 1884

Species
- T. longaevus Owen, 1884; T. maximus

= Tritylodon =

Tritylodon Temporal range: Early Jurassic

Extinct genus of mammaliamorphs

Tritylodon (from the Greek for "three-cusped tooth") is an extinct genus of tritylodonts, one of the most advanced group of cynodont therapsids. They lived in the Early Jurassic and possibly Late Triassic periods along with dinosaurs. They also shared many characteristics with mammals, and were once considered mammals because of overall skeleton construction. That was changed due to them retaining the vestigial amniote jawbones and a different skull structure. Tritylodonts are now regarded as non-mammalian synapsids.

== Characteristics ==
If a living Tritylodon were to be seen today, it would look a lot like a large rodent. Their method of chewing food, a grinding motion with the bottom teeth sliding against the top teeth, resembled that of rodents as well. The bottom teeth were much like a set of cusps and the top teeth were a set of matching grooves that matched perfectly allowing this motion. There were large incisors at the very front of their mouth separated by a gap from the rest of the teeth. The incisors would stick out and remain slightly visible when the mouth was closed. The legs were directly beneath the body like mammals, unlike the earlier therapsids with sprawling limbs.

These animals were burrowers; the structure of the shoulder, front limbs, and large front incisors show this. They used their incisors to help dig and unearth buried plants. The way they ate and the shape of their teeth demonstrate that Tritylodons were probably primarily herbivorous (though some tritylodontids show evidence of more omnivorous diets, and modern analogues like rodents tend to be more omnivorous than their dentitions lead on). Any of the Tritylodonts including Tritylodon were warm-blooded or endothermic. Like most non-placental mammalimorphs, it had epipubic bones, aiding in its erect gait but preventing the expansion of the abdomen, making it unable to go through prolonged pregnancy and instead give birth to altricial young like modern marsupials and monotremes.

== Habitat ==
The Tritylodons' habitat was limited to the forests of South Africa When the species originated, about 200 million years ago, the African area was drier and hotter. But for most of their existence the climate was tropical and wetter.

== Fossils ==
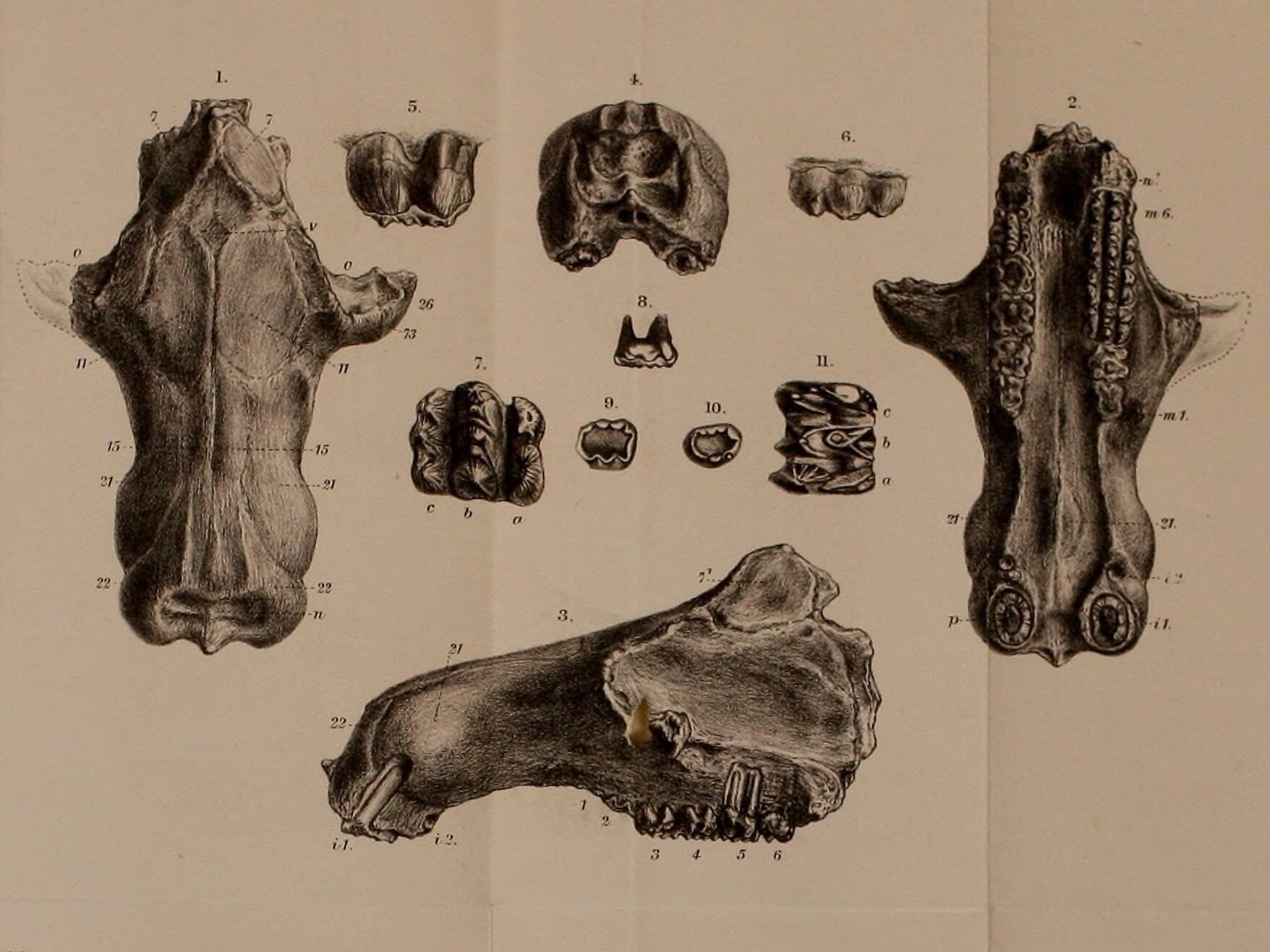
"Tritylodon Longaevus" illustration, from The Quarterly journal of the Geological Society of London, published in 1884.

The Tritylodon fossils in South Africa are found concentrated mainly in an area about 11,000 km^{2} (4,250 mi^{2}). They have been found in floodplain deposits of the Lower Jurassic Elliot Formation (upper Karoo Supergroup). In this area there have been so many findings it has been named the Tritylodon Acme Zone. The fossil findings have all been in the Free State of South Africa.

The genus Tritylodon of the Tritylodonts is restricted to the South African forms: Tritylodon longaevus and Tritylodon maximus. It is suggested that T. maximus is either a large T. longeavus or a closely related species. If it is a closely related species it could possibly be ecological succession since the larger T. maximus fossils have been dated in the Sinemurian–Pliensbachian mainly less than 190 million years ago and the T. longaevus in the Hettangian–Sinemurian mainly more than 190 million years ago. With the fossil findings of each species overlapping in Sinemurian stage, the fossils show two differences, T. maximus being larger and having nine upper postcanines (neither species had canine teeth) instead of the seven teeth like T. longeavus. All other structures of the two Tritylodon species were the same.

Below is a cladogram from Ruta, Botha-Brink, Mitchell and Benton (2013) showing one hypothesis of cynodont relationships:

- Cynodontia
  - †Charassognathus
  - - - †Dvinia
      - †Procynosuchus
    - Epicynodontia
      - †Cynosaurus
      - - - †Galesaurus
          - †Progalesaurus
        - - - †Nanictosaurus
            - †Thrinaxodon
          - - †Platycraniellus
            - Eucynodontia
              - †Cynognathia →
              - Probainognathia →

- → †Cynognathia
  - †Cynognathus
  - †Gomphodontia
    - †Diademodon
    - - †Trirachodontidae
        - - †Beishanodon
          - †Sinognathus
        - - †Trirachodon
          - - †Cricodon
            - †Langbergia
      - †Traversodontidae
        - - †Andescynodon
          - †Pascualgnathus
        - - †Scalenodon
          - - †Luangwa
            - - †Traversodon
              - - - †"Scalenodon" attridgei
                  - - †Mandagomphodon
                    - - †Nanogomphodon
                      - - †Arctotraversodon
                        - †Boreogomphodon
                - - †Massetognathinae
                    - †Massetognathus
                    - - †Dadadon
                      - †Santacruzodon
                  - †Gomphodontosuchinae&
                    - †Menadon
                    - - †Gomphodontosuchus
                      - - †Protuberum
                        - - †Exaeretodon
                          - †Scalenodontoides

- → Probainognathia
  - †Lumkuia
  - - †Ecteninion
    - - - †Aleodon
        - †Chiniquodon
      - - †Probainognathus
        - - †Trucidocynodon
          - - †Therioherpeton
            - - †Tritheledontidae
                - †Riograndia
                - - - †Chaliminia
                    - †Elliotherium
                  - - †Diarthrognathus
                    - †Pachygenelus
              - - †Brasilodontidae
                  - †Brasilitherium
                  - †Brasilodon
                - - †Tritylodontidae
                    - †Oligokyphus
                    - - †Kayentatherium
                      - - †Tritylodon
                        - †Beinotherium
                  - Mammaliaformes
                    - Mammalia
                    - †Sinoconodon
                    - †Morganucodon
