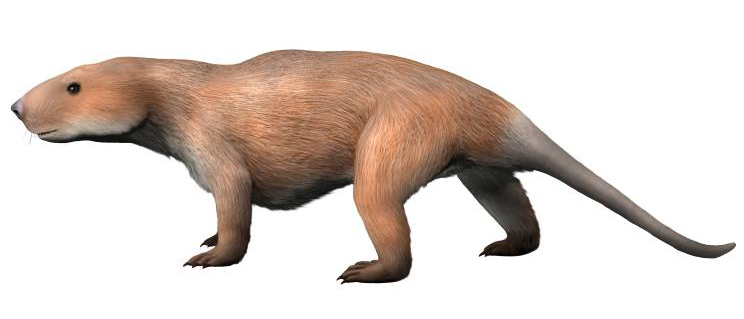
- Life restoration of Riograndia guaibensis

Scientific classification
- Kingdom: Animalia
- Phylum: Chordata
- Clade: Synapsida
- Clade: Therapsida
- Clade: Cynodontia
- Family: †Tritheledontidae
- Genus: †Riograndia; Bonaparte et al., 2001
- Species: †R. guaibensis

Binomial name
- †Riograndia guaibensis Bonaparte et al., 2001

= Riograndia =

Riograndia Temporal range: Norian ~225.42 Ma

Extinct genus of cynodonts

Riograndia is an extinct genus of prozostrodontian cynodonts from the Late Triassic of Brazil. The type and only species is Riograndia guaibensis, named after the State of Rio Grande do Sul and Guaíba Basin, where it was discovered. Remains have been found in the Caturrita Formation of the geopark of Paleorrota. It was a small non-mammalian cynodont, with several advanced features also present in mammals. Several specimens of Riograndia guaibensis have been found in the towns of Candelária and Faxinal do Soturno in the Caturrita Formation. The genus defines the Riograndia Assemblage Zone.

== Description ==
Holotype (MCN-PV 2264) is an anterior part of a skull, from the tip of snout to the fronto-parietal contact, with complete dentition. The unique feature of Riograndia are lobed postcanine teeth with approximately equal 5-9 sharp cuspules located along the almost semicircular edge of the crowns of the upper postcanine teeth and in the posterodorsal edge of the lower postcanine teeth. Most specimens have skulls of approximately 35 mm long. Study of the postcranial skeleton shows that Riograndia had a semi-sprawling forelimbs, similar to those of more basal synapsids. The limbs of more advanced cynodonts are positioned more straight. The body of Riograndia was held above the ground with the help of adductor muscles attached to the forelimbs.

== Classification ==
Riograndia was originally assigned to the monotypic family Riograndidae within Ictidosauria. Later some authors considered it as a non-tritheledontid ictidosaur or as a basal genus in the family Tritheledontidae. Other tritheledontids include the related Irajatherium, and two clades, a more basal group including Sinoconodon, Brasilitherium, Brasilodon, and Morganucodon, and a more derived clade of Chaliminia, Elliotherium, Pachygenelus, Diarthrognathus, and Tritheledon. The below cladogram was found by Martinelli and Rougier in 2007 and modified by Soares et al. in 2011, with Tritheledontidae added after Ruta et al. (2013):

- - - Brasilodon
    - - Brasilitherium
      - - Sinoconodon
        - Morganucodon
  - Tritheledontidae
    - Riograndia
    - - Irajatherium
      - - - Chaliminia
          - Elliotherium
        - - Pachygenelus
          - - Diarthrognathus
            - Tritheledon

A cladogram after Stefanello et al. (2023):

- Probainognathia
  - Lumkuia
  - - Chiniquodon
    - Probainognathidae
    - - Ecteniniidae
      - - Protheriodon
        - Prozostrodontia
          - Prozostrodontidae
            - Prozostrodon
            - Pseudotherium
          - - Therioherpeton
            - - Irajatherium
              - - Riograndia
                - - - Diarthrognathus
                    - Pachygenelus
                  - - Tritylodontidae
                    - - Botucaraitherium
                      - - Brasilodon
                        - Mammaliaformes

== Paleoecology ==
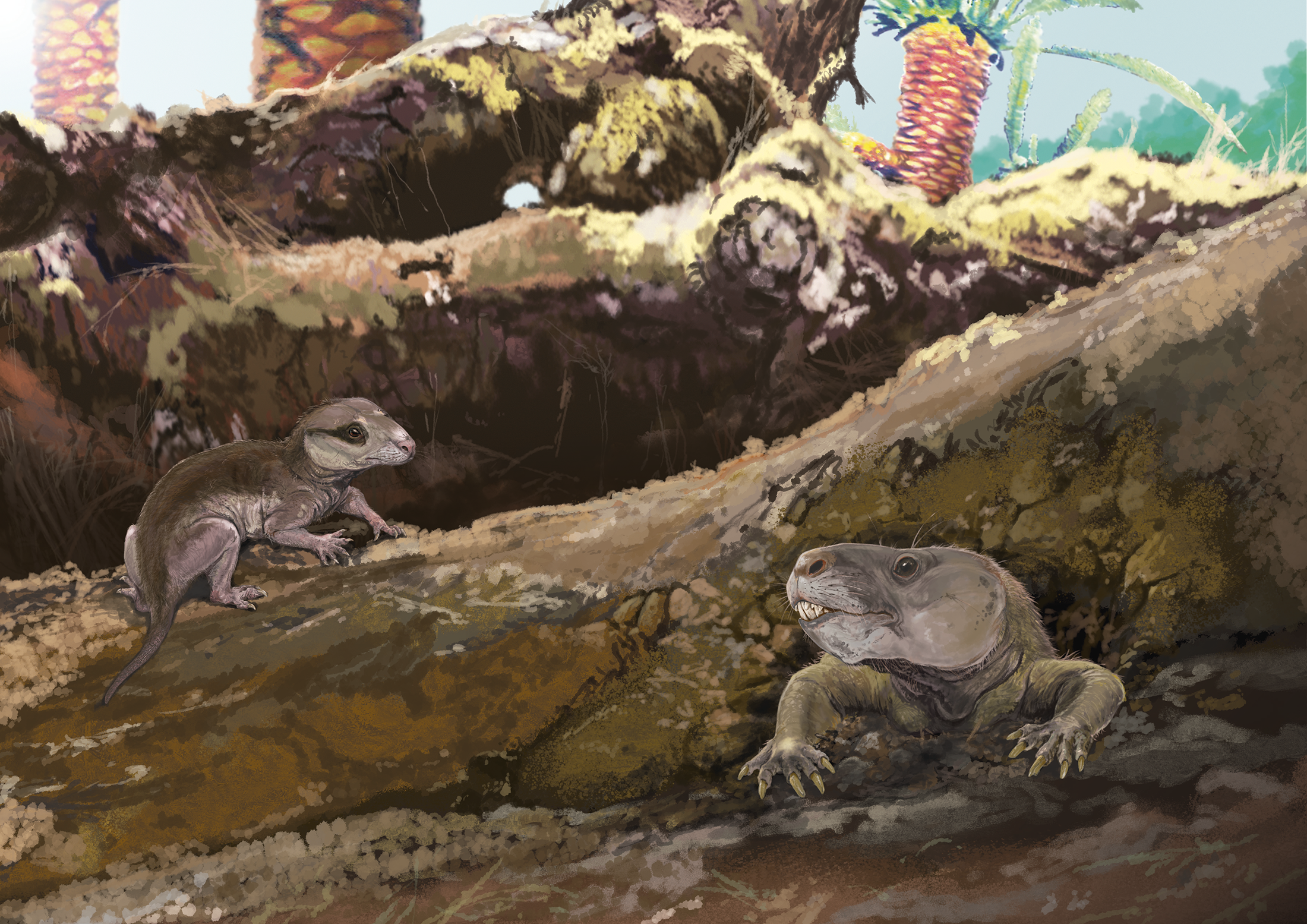
Restoration of Brasilodon and Riograndia

All specimens of Riograndia come from the Late Triassic aged Caturrita Formation. The formation dates to about 225.42 million years ago. Dinosaurs from the formation only include the sauropodomorphs Unaysaurus and Guaibasaurus. Non-dinosaurian animals include the dinosauriform Sacisaurus; the dicynodont Jachaleria; an unnamed phytosaurian; isolated archosaurian teeth; an amphibian classified in Stereospondyli; and many common tetrapods smaller than 15 cm (5.9 in) long. Among the tetrapods is the procolophonid Soturnia; the sphenodontid Clevosaurus; the lepidosaurian Cargninia; the archosaurian Faxinalipterus, and an assortment of mammaliamorphs including Riograndia, Brasilodon, and Irajatherium.
