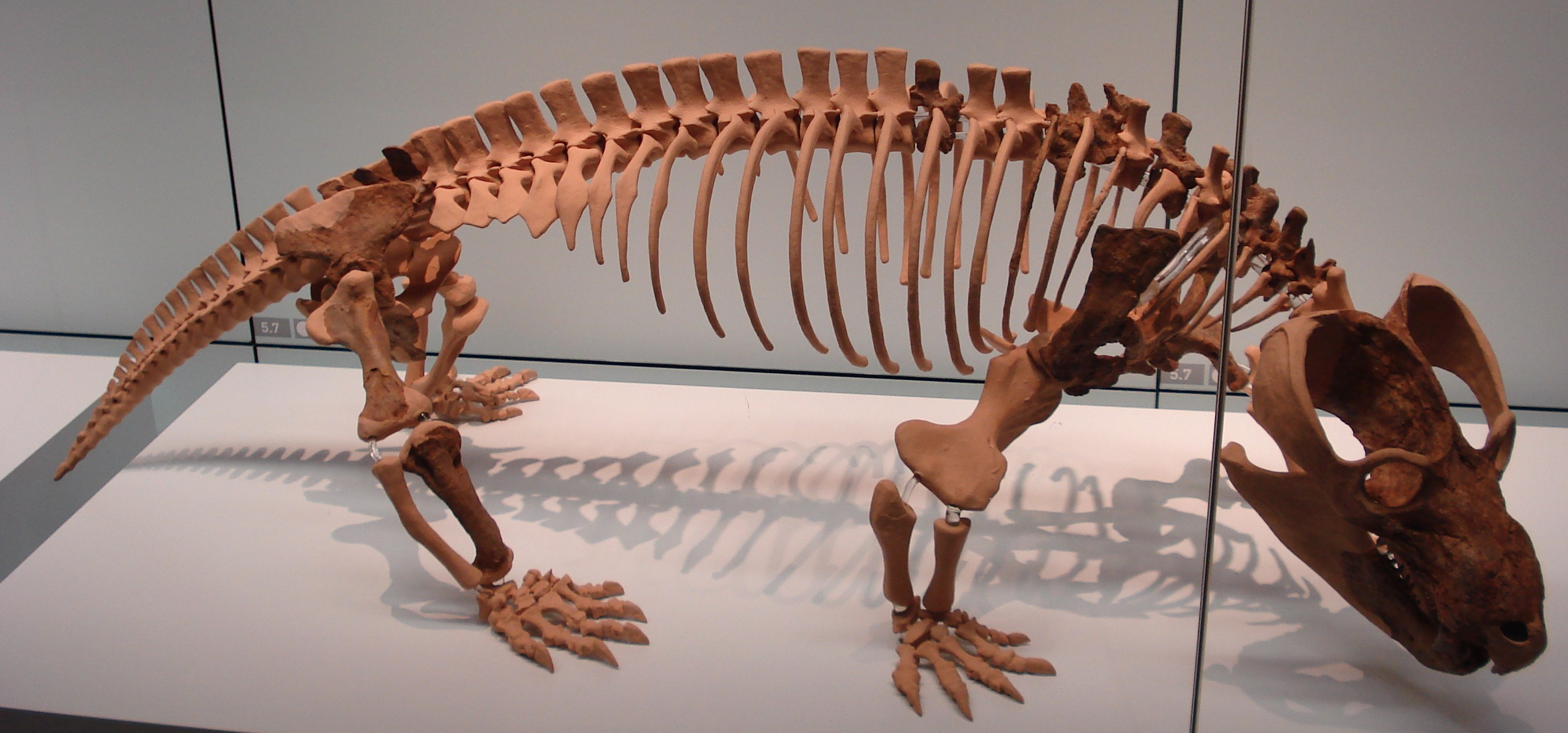
- Fossil of the probainognathian Chiniquodon theotonicus in the Staatliches Museum für Naturkunde Stuttgart

Scientific classification
- Kingdom: Animalia
- Phylum: Chordata
- Clade: Synapsida
- Clade: Therapsida
- Clade: Cynodontia
- Clade: Eucynodontia
- Clade: Probainognathia; Hopson, 1990

Subgroups
- †Agudotherium; †Candelariodon; †Charruodon; †Lumkuia?; †Protheriodon; †Chiniquodontidae; †Ecteniniidae; †Probainognathidae; Prozostrodontia

= Probainognathia =

Probainognathia Temporal range: Middle Triassic–Holocene

Clade of cynodonts

Probainognathia is one of the two major subgroups of the clade Eucynodontia, the other being Cynognathia. The earliest forms were carnivorous and insectivorous, though some groups eventually also evolved herbivorous diets. The earliest and most basal probainognathian is the Middle Triassic (Anisian) aged Lumkuia, from South Africa, though probainognathians would not become prominent until the mid Norian stage of the Late Triassic. Three groups survived the extinction at the end of Triassic: Tritheledontidae and Tritylodontidae, which both survived until the Jurassic—the latter even into the Cretaceous (Montirictus and Xenocretosuchus)—and Mammaliaformes, which includes the mammals. Members of the group show the loss of the parietal eye at the top of the skull and the closure of the corresponding hole in the skull roof (pineal foramen).

== Phylogeny ==
Below is a cladogram from Ruta, Botha-Brink, Mitchell and Benton (2013) showing one hypothesis of cynodont relationships:

- Eucynodontia
  - †Cynognathia
  - Probainognathia
    - †Lumkuia
    - - †Ecteninion
      - - - †Aleodon
          - †Chiniquodon
        - - †Probainognathus
          - - †Trucidocynodon
            - - †Therioherpeton
              - - †Tritheledontidae
                  - †Riograndia
                  - - - †Chaliminia
                      - †Elliotherium
                    - - †Diarthrognathus
                      - †Pachygenelus
                - - †Brasilodontidae
                    - †Brasilitherium
                    - †Brasilodon
                  - - †Tritylodontidae
                      - †Oligokyphus
                      - - †Kayentatherium
                        - - †Tritylodon
                          - †Bienotherium
                    - Mammaliaformes
                      - †Sinoconodon
                      - - †Morganucodon
                        - Mammalia

Cladogram from Stefanello et al. (2023):

- Probainognathia
  - Lumkuia
  - - Chiniquodon
    - - Probainognathidae
        - Bonacynodon
        - Probainognathus
    - - Ecteniniidae
      - - Protheriodon
        - Prozostrodontia
          - Prozostrodontidae
            - Prozostrodon
            - Pseudotherium
          - - Therioherpeton
            - - Irajatherium
              - - Riograndia
                - - - Diarthrognathus
                    - Pachygenelus
                  - - Tritylodontidae
                    - - Botucaraitherium
                      - - Brasilodon
                        - Mammaliaformes

== See also ==
- Evolution of mammals
- List of prehistoric mammals
