= Caturrita Formation =

Rock formation in Rio Grande do Sul, Brazil

- Stratigraphic range: Late Triassic; ~225.42 Ma
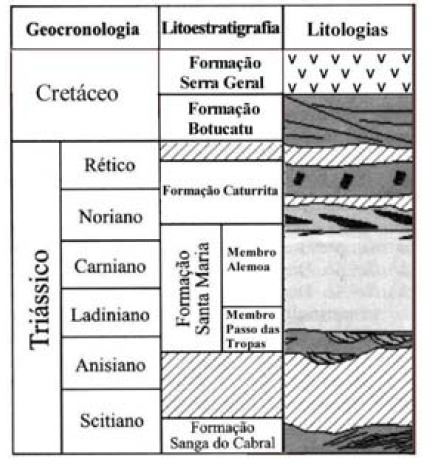
- Caturrita Formation. Source: UFSM
- Type: Geological formation
- Unit of: Rosário do Sul Group
- Underlies: Mata Sandstone
- Overlies: Alemoa Member; Santa Maria Formation
- Area: 250 km (160 mi)
- Thickness: 30–60 m (98–197 ft)

Lithology
- Primary: Sandstone, siltstone
- Other: Mudstone, conglomerate

Location
- Coordinates: 29.695042°S 53.795403°W
- Approximate paleocoordinates: 37.3°S 16.0°W
- Region: Paleorrota; Rio Grande do Sul
- Country: Brazil
- Extent: Paraná Basin

Type section
- Named for: Caturrita, barrio of Santa Maria
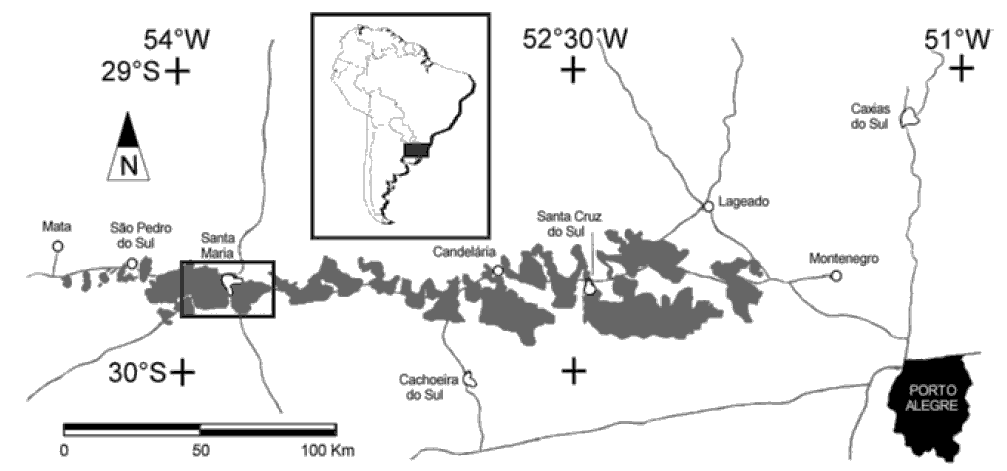
- Geopark of Paleorrota

The Caturrita Formation is a rock formation found in Rio Grande do Sul, Brazil. Its sediments were deposited in the Paraná Basin. The formation is from the Upper Triassic and forms part of the Santa Maria Supersequence in the upper section of the Rosário do Sul Group.

== Etymology ==
The formation received this name, because Caturrita is a neighbourhood (bairro) of Santa Maria. In Portuguese caturrita also refers to the monk parakeet.

== Stratigraphy ==
The sediments of the Caturrita Formation belong to the second unit of the Santa Maria Supersequence and overlie the Alemoa Member of the Santa Maria Formation. The clayey sediments of the Alemoa Member gradually give way to the more sandy, rarely conglomeratic, Caturrita Formation, which finishes with an unconformity. After this erosional event follow the Rhaetian sediments of the Mata Sandstone, the third unit of the Santa Maria Supersequence.

The Caturrita Formation was once regarded as a member of the stratigraphically higher Botucatu Formation or was expanded to include the Mata Sandstone.

The Caturrita Formation reaches a maximum thickness of 60 meters, but generally oscillates around values of 30 meters.

== Age ==
Until 2018 no absolute ages had been determined, but the formation was most commonly assigned to a late Carnian to early Norian age on paleontological grounds. However, Rhaetian or even Early Jurassic age of this unit was also advocated in the literature. A U-Pb (Uranium decay) dating found that the Caturrita Formation dated around 225.42 million years ago, putting it less than 10 million years younger than the Santa Maria and Ischigualasto Formations, from where the earliest dinosaurs are known.

== Geographical occurrence ==
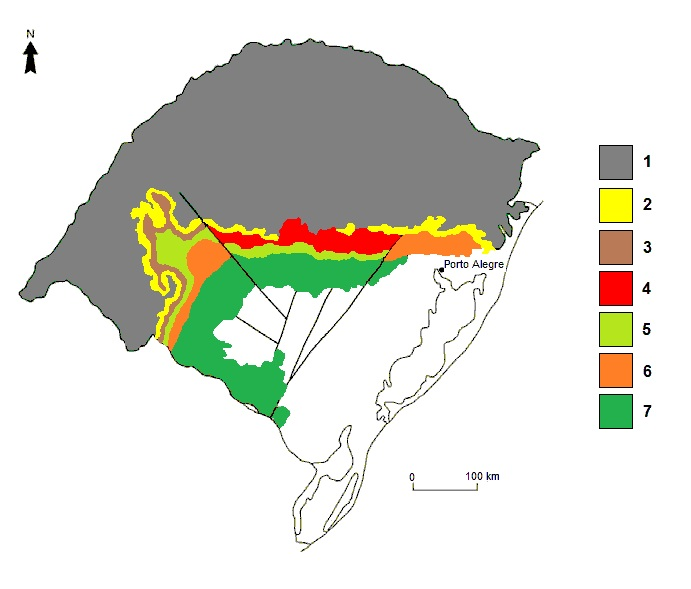
Geological formations in Rio Grande do Sul:
1. Serra Geral Formation, Cretaceous
2. Botucatu Formation, Cretaceous
3. Guará Formation, Jurassic
4. Santa Maria Formation & Caturrita Formation, Triassic
5. Sanga do Cabral Formation, Triassic
6. Piramboia Formation, Permian
7. Itararé Group, Permian

Outcrops of the Caturrita Formation are found in the Brazilian state of Rio Grande do Sul. From the town of Taquari they follow for 250 kilometers a thin band in the central part of the state in an east-westerly fashion right up to Mata.

== Depositional environment ==
The sediments of the Caturrita Formation belong to the upper section of the Santa Maria Supersequence. In terms of sequence stratigraphy they are equivalent to a highstand systems tract. The scarlet, ephemeral, mainly clayey fluvio-lacustrine deposits of the Alemoa Member gradually cede to more sandy, occasionally gravelly deposits of a braided river-system that was operational all-year-round. These deposits of the Caturrita Formation settled out in an alluvial flood-plain. The changeover in sedimentary facies was accompanied by a climatic change to more humid conditions.

The sediments are of continental nature (red beds) and form massive sandstone and siltstone bodies.

== Vertebrate fauna ==
The Caturrita Formation contains a biozone for tetrapods, the so-called "Ictidosauria Assemblage Zone″ Ca-1.Ictidosaurs are tritheledontid cynodonts, a sister group of the mammals. This is the reason, why this biozone recently has been renamed as "Mammaliamorpha Cenozone" to underline the importance of the cynodont fossils. The Caturrita Formation also hosts the stratigraphic marker level "Jachaleria" named after the dicynodont Jachaleria candelariensis. Dinosaurs and other vertebrates have been discovered as well.

In 1998 tracks of prosauropods have been found near Faxinal do Soturno that were most likely caused by Unaysaurus tolentinoi.

The fossil finds are concentrated around three major areas: Santa Maria and northern surroundings (Água Negra) Faxinal do Soturno Candelária and surroundings (Linha São Luis)

The following taxa have been discovered so far in the Caturrita Formation:

Color key: Taxon / Reclassified taxon / Taxon falsely reported as present / Dubious taxon or junior synonym / Ichnotaxon / Ootaxon / Morphotaxon

Notes
Uncertain or tentative taxa are in small text
~~crossed out~~ taxa are discredited.

=== Synapsids ===
Synapsids of the Caturrita Formation
Genus	Species	Location	Stratigraphic position	Material	Notes	Images
Botucaraitherium	B. belarminoi	Sesmaria do Pinhal			A mammaliamorph cynodont	Brasilodon Riograndia
Brasilitherium	B. riograndensis				Synonym of Brasilodon quadrangularis	Brasilodon Riograndia
Brasilodon	B. quadrangularis	Linha São Luiz, Sesmaria do Pinhal			A mammaliamorph cynodont	Brasilodon Riograndia
Irajatherium	I. hernandezi	Linha São Luiz, Sesmaria do Pinhal			A tritheledontid cynodont	Brasilodon Riograndia
Jachaleria	J. candelariensis	Sesmaria do Pinhal			A stahleckeriid dicynodont	Brasilodon Riograndia
cf. Jachaleria	cf. J. candelariensis	Alto Guarda Mor site			A stahleckeriid dicynodont	Brasilodon Riograndia
Minicynodon	M. maieri				Synonym of Brasilodon quadrangularis	Brasilodon Riograndia
Riograndia	R. guaibensis	Linha São Luiz, Sesmaria do Pinhal			A tritheledontid cynodont	Brasilodon Riograndia
Traversodontidae indet.	Indeterminate	Sesmaria do Pinhal, Sacisaurus site				Brasilodon Riograndia

=== Dinosaurs ===
Unnamed prosauropod genus present in Rio Grande do Sul, Brazil.

Dinosaurs of the Caturrita Formation
Genus	Species	Location	Stratigraphic position	Material	Notes	Images
Eubrontes	Indeterminate	Rio Grande do Sul, Brazil.		Two isolated footprints	An ichnotaxon; footprints of large theropod dinosaurs.	Guaibasaurus Unaysaurus
Guaibasaurus	G. candelariensis	Rio Grande do Sul, Brazil.	Linha São Luiz	"Partial postcranial skeleton and a fragmentary hindlimb."	Sauropodomorph	Guaibasaurus Unaysaurus
Sauropodomorpha indet.	Indeterminate	Rio Grande do Sul, Brazil		"An incomplete right ilium, uninformative vertebral remains and other indeterminate fragments, plus four isolated and incomplete bones including a possible pubis, an ischium, a possible tibia and a metatarsal IV."	An indeterminate sauropodomorph of uncertain phylogenetic placement, probably "closer to Plateosauria (...) than to Saturnalia-like basal–most sauropodomorphs".	Guaibasaurus Unaysaurus
Sauropodomorpha indet.	Indeterminate	Rio Grande do Sul, Brazil		"Three incomplete dinosaur specimens, an isolated sacral vertebra, an articulated left pubis–ischium and an isolated right ischium."	An indeterminate sauropodomorph of uncertain phylogenetic placement, "probably more primitive than typical 'prosauropods' from the Norian-Early Jurassic".	Guaibasaurus Unaysaurus
Unaysaurus	U. tolentinoi	Rio Grande do Sul, Brazil			Sauropodomorph	Guaibasaurus Unaysaurus

=== Other tetrapods ===
Misc tetrapods of the Caturrita Formation
Genus	Species	Location	Stratigraphic position	Material	Notes	Images
Cargninia	C. enigmatica	Rio Grande do Sul, Brazil			Lepidosaur	Maehary skull material Proterochampsa Sacisaurus
Clevosaurus	C. brasiliensis				Sphenodont	Maehary skull material Proterochampsa Sacisaurus
Faxinalipterus	F. minimus	Rio Grande do Sul, Brazil			A lagerpetid	Maehary skull material Proterochampsa Sacisaurus
Maehary	M. bonapartei	Rio Grande do Sul, Brazil			The earliest diverging member of Pterosauromorpha	Maehary skull material Proterochampsa Sacisaurus
Proterochampsa					Proterochampsid	Maehary skull material Proterochampsa Sacisaurus
Soturnia	S. caliodon				Procolophonian	Maehary skull material Proterochampsa Sacisaurus
Sacisaurus	S. agudoensis	Rio Grande do Sul, Brazil			Silesaurid	Maehary skull material Proterochampsa Sacisaurus
Stereospondyli indet.	Indeterminate	Rio Grande do Sul, Brazil		An incomplete interclavicle	An indeterminate stereospondyl temnospondyl.	Maehary skull material Proterochampsa Sacisaurus
Teyumbaita	T. sulcognathus	Rio Grande do Sul, Brazil		"Two nearly complete skulls and a partial skull."	Rhynchosaur	Maehary skull material Proterochampsa Sacisaurus
Phytosauria indet.	Indeterminate, possible recognized as cf. Parasuchus	Botucaraí Hill		Fragments parts of the lower jaw	An indeterminate Phytosauria.	Maehary skull material Proterochampsa Sacisaurus

== See also ==
- Santa Maria Formation
- List of dinosaur-bearing rock formations
- Laguna Colorada Formation
- Elliot Formation
