= Sommerxylon =

Sommerxylon Temporal range: 228–199.6 Ma

Scientific classification
- Kingdom: Plantae
- Clade: Tracheophytes
- Clade: Gymnospermae
- Division: Pinophyta
- Class: Pinopsida
- Order: Cupressales
- Family: Taxaceae
- Genus: †Sommerxylon; Pires & Guerra-Sommer

Species
- Sommerxylon spiralosus

Extinct genus of conifers

Sommerxylon is a genus described from petrified trunks of Gymnosperms that lived in the Triassic, found in the Caturrita Formation on Linha São Luiz in the municipality of Faxinal do Soturno in the region of Paleorrota. It is named in honor of Dr. Margot Guerra Sommer.

== Description ==
Pith composed of parenchyma cells and sclerenchyma cells, primary xylem is endarch, secondary xylem with points with halos that dominate, thick radial walls of tracheids, absence of resin canals and axial parenchyma, which lead to some authors suggesting a close relationship to the family Taxaceae. However, other authors have considered their affinities to the family equivocal.
