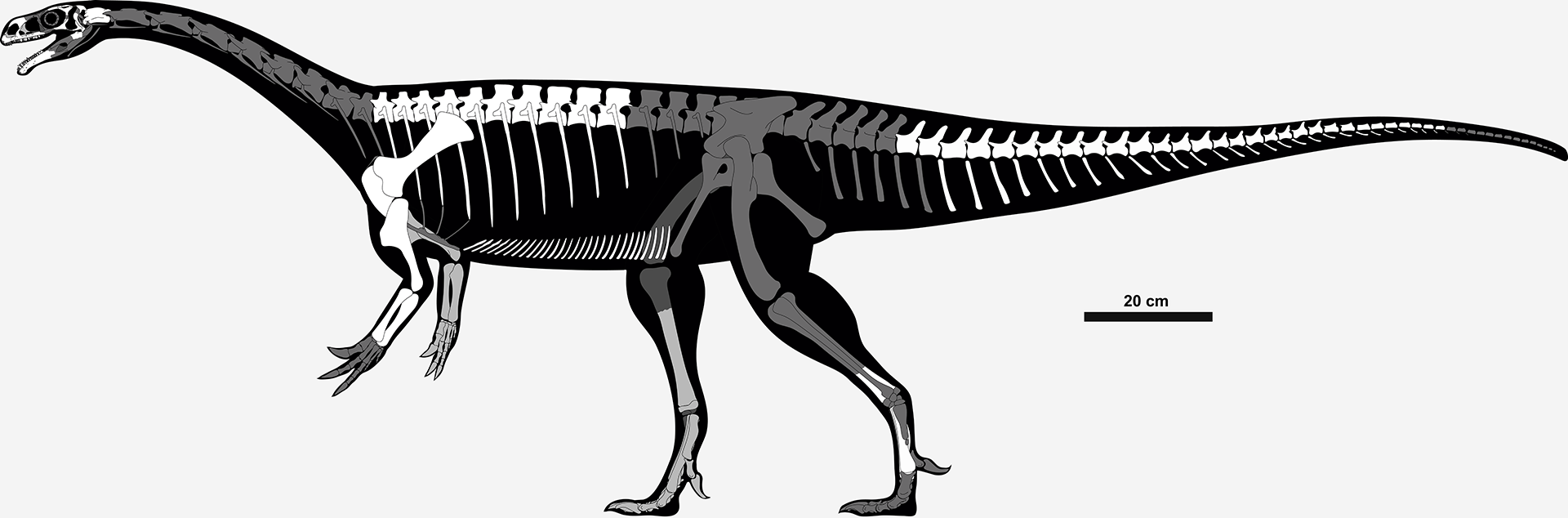
- Skeletal diagram showing known remains

Scientific classification
- Kingdom: Animalia
- Phylum: Chordata
- Class: Reptilia
- Clade: Dinosauria
- Clade: Saurischia
- Clade: †Sauropodomorpha
- Clade: †Bagualosauria
- Clade: †Unaysauridae
- Genus: †Unaysaurus; Leal et al., 2004

Type species
- †Unaysaurus tolentinoi Leal et al., 2004

= Unaysaurus =

Unaysaurus Temporal range: Late Triassic, 225.42 Ma

Extinct genus of dinosaurs

Unaysaurus is a genus of herbivorous unaysaurid sauropodomorph dinosaur. Discovered in southern Brazil, in the geopark of Paleorrota, in 1998, and announced in a press conference on Thursday, December 3, 2004, it is one of the oldest dinosaurs known. It is closely related to plateosaurid dinosaurs found in Germany, which indicates that it was relatively easy for species to spread across the giant landmass of the time, the supercontinent of Pangaea. The fossils of Unaysaurus are well-preserved. They consist of an almost complete skull, including a lower jaw, and partial skeleton with many of the bones still connected to each other in their natural positions. It is one of the most complete dinosaur skeletons (including complete skull) ever recovered in Brazil.

== Discovery and naming ==
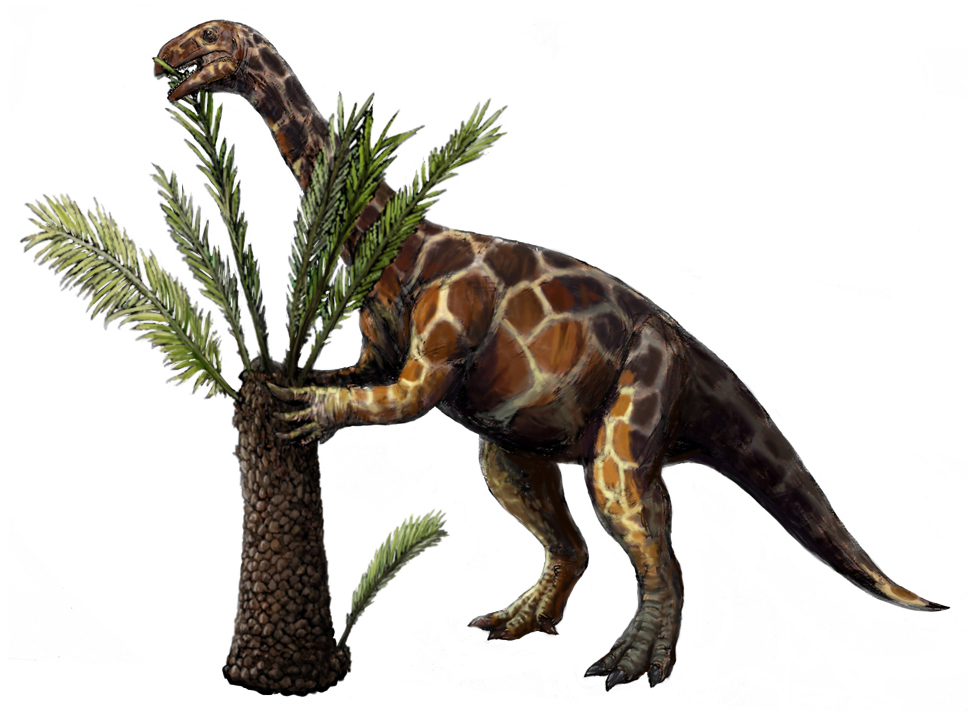
Life restoration

Unaysaurus was found in the southern Brazilian state of Rio Grande do Sul, near the city of Santa Maria. It was recovered from the red beds of the Caturrita Formation, which is the geologic formation where similarly old dinosaurs like Saturnalia have been found. The oldest dinosaurs in the world are from here and nearby in Argentina (like the Eoraptor), which suggests that the first dinosaurs may have originated in the area.

In 2004, Luciano A. Leal, Sergio A. K. Azevodo, Alexander W. A. Kellner, and Átila A. S. da Rosa described Unaysaurus tolentinoi as a new genus and species on the basis of the holotype specimen UFSM 11069. The generic name, "Unaysaurus", comes from the word unay (u-na-hee), meaning "black water" in the local Tupi language, which in turn refers to Agua Negra (also "black water"), the Portuguese name for the region where the fossils were found. The specific name, "tolentinoi" honors Tolentino Marafiga, who discovered the fossils by the side of a road in 1998.

== Description ==
Size of the holotype specimen compared to a human

Like most early dinosaurs, Unaysaurus was relatively small, and walked on two legs. It was only 2.5 meters (8.2 feet) long, 70 to 80 centimeters (2.3 to 2.6 ft) tall, and weighed about 70 kilograms (150 lb)).

In 2023, Müller and colleagues described the remains of a juvenile specimen of Unaysaurus that was found associated with the holotype. The bones, including partial vertebrae and various foot material, are similarly proportioned to the bones of the holotype.

== Classification ==
Upon its description, Unaysaurus was assigned to the Plateosauridae. Under this assignment, the closest relative of Unaysaurus was, counter intuitively, not from South America, but rather Plateosaurus, which lived about 210 million years ago in Germany. However, in 2018, Unaysaurus was found to belong to the newly erected clade Unaysauridae, alongside Macrocollum and Jaklapallisaurus, the former of which was from Brazil.

== Paleoecology ==
Unaysaurus lived between about 225 to 200 million years ago, in the Carnian or Norian age of the late Triassic period. It was found in the south of Brazil, which at the time was connected to northwest Africa. The whole world was united into the great supercontinent of Pangaea, which was just starting to divide into Laurasia in the north, and Gondwana in the south. A U-Pb (Uranium decay) dating found that the Caturrita Formation dated around 225.42 million years ago, putting it less than 10 million years younger than the Santa Maria and Ischigualasto Formations, from where the earliest dinosaurs are known.

The Caturrita Formation has uncovered a wide variety of fauna, although the formation is also referred to as the upper portion of the Santa Maria 2 Sequence. Multiple dinosauriforms are represented in the rock of the formation, including the silesaur Sacisaurus agudoensis, and the coeval sauropodomorph Guaibasaurus candelariensis, all of which are not found anywhere else. The dicynodont Jachaleria candelariensis, an unclassified phytosaur, and isolated teeth of archosaur origin can also be unearthed in the formation. A single stereospondyl amphibian is known from the formation, but has not yet been identified specifically.

An extremely rich amount of small tetrapods have been recovered from the Caturrita Formation, which is quite surprising. They measure less than 15 cm (5.9 in) long. Species preserved are the procolophonid Soturnia caliodon, the lepidosaur Cargninia enigmatica, the sphenodontid Clevosaurus brasiliensis, and some small therapsids coexisting with Faxinalipterus minima, a putative pterosaur. The therapsids include Riograndia guaibensis, Brasilodon quadrangularis, and Irajatherium hernandezi .
