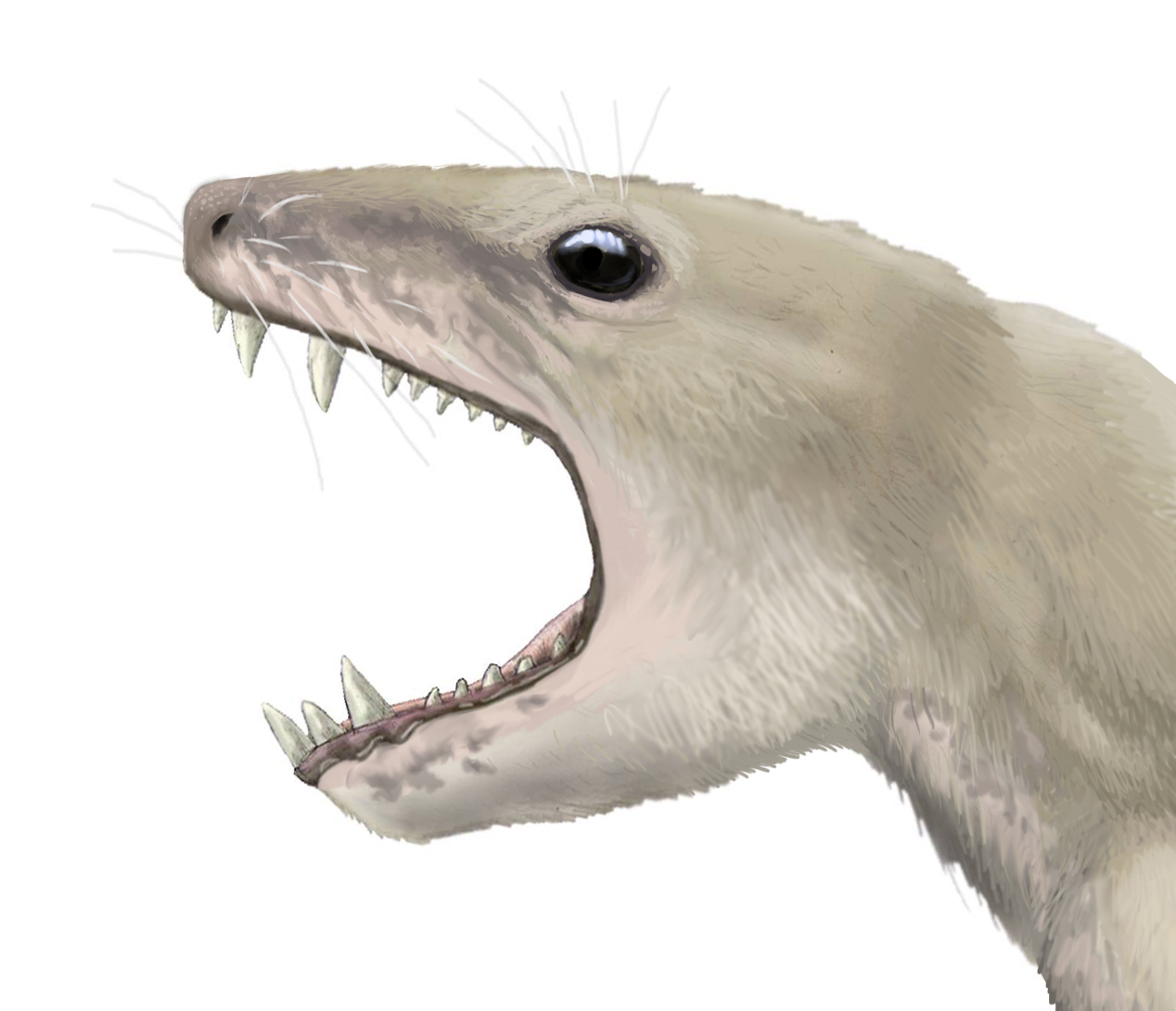
- Restoration of Pachygenelus monus

Scientific classification
- Kingdom: Animalia
- Phylum: Chordata
- Clade: Synapsida
- Clade: Therapsida
- Clade: Cynodontia
- Clade: Prozostrodontia
- Family: †Tritheledontidae; Broom, 1912

Genera
- †Chaliminia; †Diarthrognathus; †Elliotherium; †Irajatherium; †Pachygenelus; †Riograndia; †Tritheledon

= Tritheledontidae =

Tritheledontidae Temporal range: Late Triassic to Early Jurassic

Extinct family of cynodonts

Tritheledontidae, the tritheledontids or ictidosaurs, is an extinct family of small to medium-sized (about 10 to 20 cm long) cynodonts. They were highly mammal-like, specialized cynodonts, although they still retained a few reptile-like anatomical traits. Tritheledontids were mainly carnivorous or insectivorous, though some species may have developed omnivory. Their skeletons show that they had a close relationship to mammals. Tritheledontids or their closest relatives may have given rise to the mammaliaforms. The tritheledontids were one of the longest lived non-mammalian therapsid lineages, living from the late Triassic to the Jurassic period. Tritheledontids became extinct in the Jurassic period, possibly due to competition with prehistoric mammals such as the eutriconodonts. They are known from finds in South America and South Africa, indicating that they may have lived only on the supercontinent of Gondwana. The family Tritheledontidae was named by South African paleontologist Robert Broom in 1912. The family is often misspelled "Trithelodontidae".

It is possible that tritheledontids had vibrissae, according to the PBS documentary, Your Inner Fish. A common ancestor of all therian mammals did so. It is possible that the development of the whisker sensory system played an important role in mammalian development, more generally.

== Phylogeny ==
Cladogram after Ruta, Botha-Brink, Mitchell and Benton (2013):

- Eucynodontia
  - †Cynognathia
  - Probainognathia
    - †Lumkuia
    - - †Ecteninion
      - - - †Aleodon
          - †Chiniquodon
        - - †Probainognathus
          - - †Trucidocynodon
            - - †Therioherpeton
              - - †Tritheledontidae
                  - †Riograndia
                  - - - †Chaliminia
                      - †Elliotherium
                    - - †Diarthrognathus
                      - †Pachygenelus
                - - †Brasilodontidae
                    - †Brasilitherium
                    - †Brasilodon
                  - - †Tritylodontidae
                      - †Oligokyphus
                      - - †Kayentatherium
                        - - †Tritylodon
                          - †Bienotherium
                    - Mammaliaformes
                      - †Sinoconodon
                      - - †Morganucodon
                        - Mammalia

== See also ==
- Evolution of mammals
