= Chaliminia =

Chaliminia Temporal range: Norian

Scientific classification
- Kingdom: Animalia
- Phylum: Chordata
- Clade: Synapsida
- Clade: Therapsida
- Clade: Cynodontia
- Family: †Tritheledontidae
- Subfamily: †Chalimininae; Martinelli & Rougier, 2007
- Genus: †Chaliminia; Bonaparte, 1980

Type species
- † Chaliminia musteloides Bonaparte, 1980

Extinct genus of cynodont

Chaliminia is an extinct genus of tritheledontid cynodont from the Late Triassic (Norian stage) of what is now Argentina. The type and only species is C. musteloides, from the Los Colorados Formation.

Like other tritheledontids, Chaliminia was closely related to mammaliaforms (the most advanced cynodonts, similar to mammals as historically defined). It serves as one of the earliest known tritheledontids in South America, offering insights into probainognathian diversification before the origin of mammals. The specimen has sectorial (blade-like) teeth: highly specialized postcanines with a main cusp flanked by accessory cusps—similar to Riograndia, Irajatherium and Pachygenelus.

== See also ==
- List of therapsids
