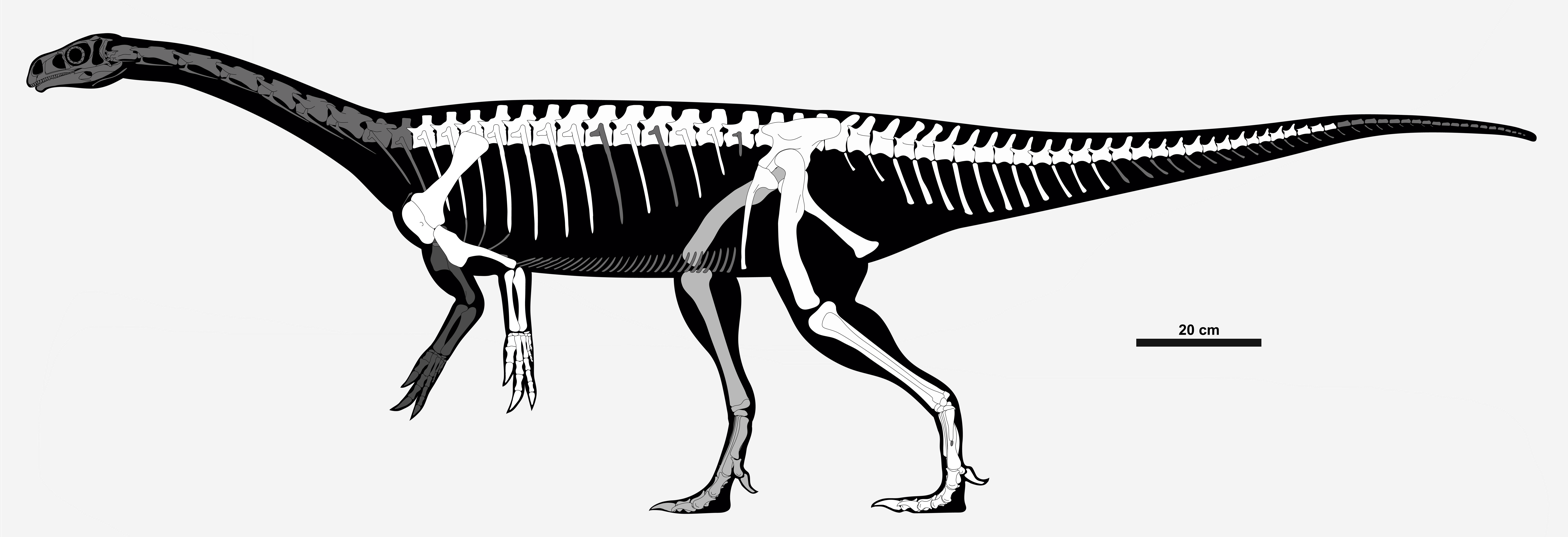
- Skeletal reconstruction of Guaibasaurus candelariensis as an advanced, Unaysaurus-grade sauropodomorph. Known elements are in white.

Scientific classification
- Kingdom: Animalia
- Phylum: Chordata
- Class: Reptilia
- Clade: Dinosauria
- Clade: Saurischia
- Clade: †Sauropodomorpha
- Family: †Guaibasauridae
- Genus: †Guaibasaurus; Bonaparte et al., 1999
- Species: †G. candelariensis

Binomial name
- †Guaibasaurus candelariensis Bonaparte et al., 1999

= Guaibasaurus =

Guaibasaurus Temporal range: Late Triassic, 225.42 Ma

Extinct genus of dinosaurs

Guaibasaurus is an extinct genus of basal saurischian dinosaur known from the Late Triassic Caturrita Formation of Rio Grande do Sul, southern Brazil. Most analyses recover it as a sauropodomorph, although there are some suggestions that it was a theropod instead. In 2016 Gregory S. Paul estimated it at around 2 meters long (6.6 ft) and 10 kg (22 lbs), whereas in 2020 Molina-Pérez and Larramendi listed it at 3 meters (10 ft) and 35 kg (77 lbs).

== Discovery ==
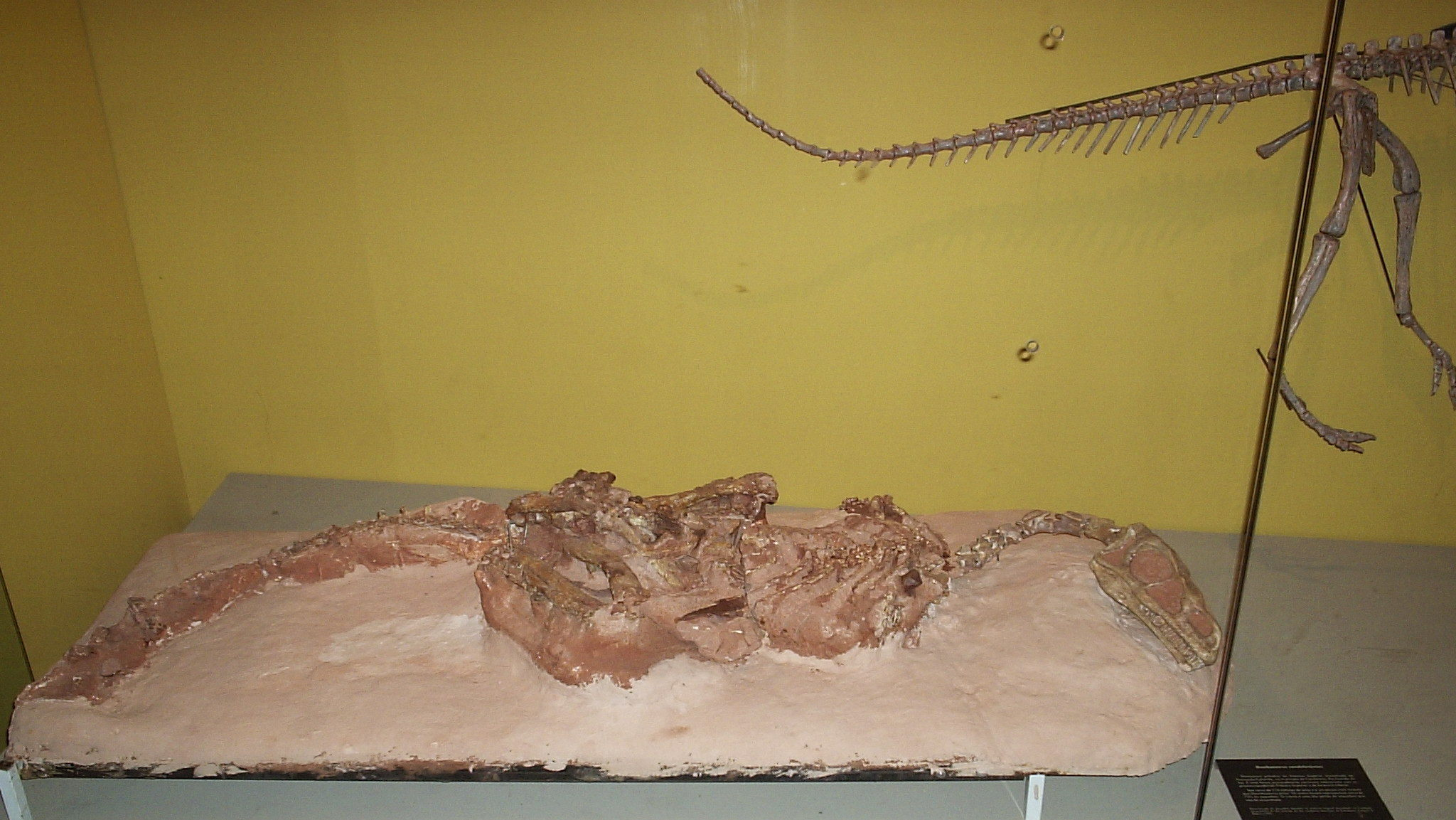
Cast of specimen UFRGS PV0725T with reconstructed head and neck

Guaibasaurus was originally named on the basis of the holotype, MCN PV2355, a well-preserved partial postcranial skeleton and the paratype, MCN PV2356, an articulated and nearly complete left hindlimb, which were discovered in the "Sesmaria do Pinhal 2" locality near Candelária, Rio Grande do Sul, in Brazil, in the upper portion of the Candelária Sequence or the Caturrita Formation.

Later, two additional specimens were referred to G. candelariensis: UFRGS PV0725T (an articulated and nearly complete postcranial skeleton missing one forelimb, both feet and the neck), and MCN PV 10112 (a not-fully-prepared block containing articulated parts and some isolated elements, including a partial hand). The referred materials were collected from the "Linha São Luiz" locality near the town of Faxinal do Soturno, Rio Grande do Sul, also in the upper portion of the Candelária Sequence or the Caturrita Formation.

All specimen were collected in these two localities from the lower portion of the Caturrita Formation (Rosário do Sul Group, Paraná Basin) or alternatively the uppermost Santa Maria 2 Sequence, dating to the early Norian faunal stage of the Late Triassic. A U-Pb (Uranium decay) dating found that the Caturrita Formation dated around 225.42 million years ago, putting it less than 10 million years younger than the Santa Maria and Ischigualasto Formations, from where the earliest dinosaurs are known.

Life reconstruction

Specimen UFRGS PV0725T is articulated with hindlimbs tucked underneath its body and forelimbs flexed to the side. Although most of the neck is not preserved, the vertebrae at the base of the neck are present in UFRGS PV0725T and curve to the left, suggesting the entire neck was curved toward the left side of the body. The posture of this skeleton is similar to the resting position of birds, and is otherwise primarily known from advanced maniraptoran dinosaurs that are closely related to birds. It has also been observed in the dinosauriform Saltopus. Like living birds, Guaibasaurus may have rested in this position to conserve body heat.

Guaibasaurus was first named by José F. Bonaparte, Jorge Ferigolo and Ana Maria Ribeiro in 1999 and the type species is Guaibasaurus candelariensis. The generic name is named after the Rio Guaíba hydrographic basin where the holotype was found as a part of the "Prό-Guaíba Project", a scientific program supporting research on fossils from the Triassic period. The specific name is named after Candelária, a city near the fossil locality in which the holotype was found.

== Classification ==
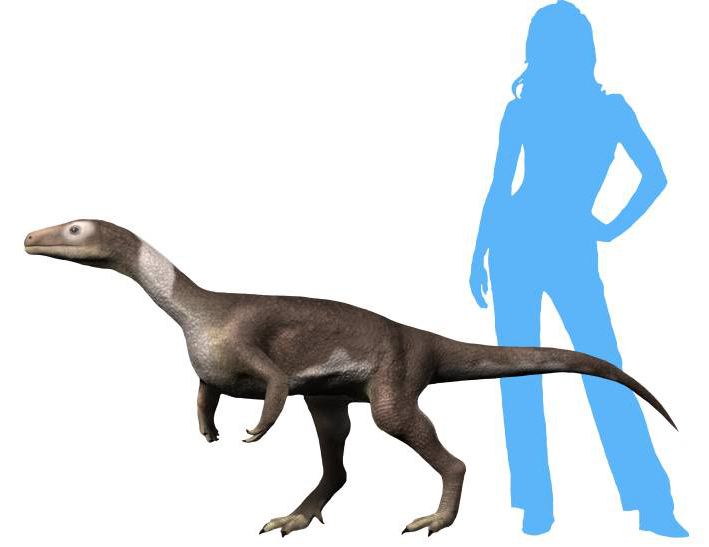
Size comparison between Guaibasaurus and a human

José Bonaparte and colleagues, in their 1999 description of the genus, found it to be possible basal theropod and placed it in its own family, Guaibasauridae. Bonaparte and colleagues (2007) found another early Brazilian dinosaur Saturnalia to be very similar to it, and placed the two in the Guaibasauridae which was found to be a primitive saurischian group. Bonaparte found that these forms may have been "prosauropods" (primitive sauropodomorphs), or an assemblage of forms close to the common ancestor of the sauropodomorphs and theropods. Overall, Bonaparte considered that both Saturnalia and Guaibasaurus were more theropod-like than "prosauropod"-like.

More recent cladistic analyses have disagreed on the placement of Guaibasaurus. Some analyses have found it to be a basal theropod, while others consider it a basal sauropodomorph. Other members of "Guaibasauridae" (such as Saturnalia) are generally considered to be very basal sauropodomorphs, and may or may not form a clade with Guaibasaurus. An article depicting a novel phylogenetic hypothesis for silesaurids also recovers Guaibasaurus as a sauropodomorph, but close-related to the coeval Unaysaurus and Macrocollum, rather than early forms such as Saturnalia. Thus, Unaysauridae is a junior synonym of Guaibasauridae in this proposal. This result was corroborated in the description paper of the theropod Erythrovenator jacuiensis.
