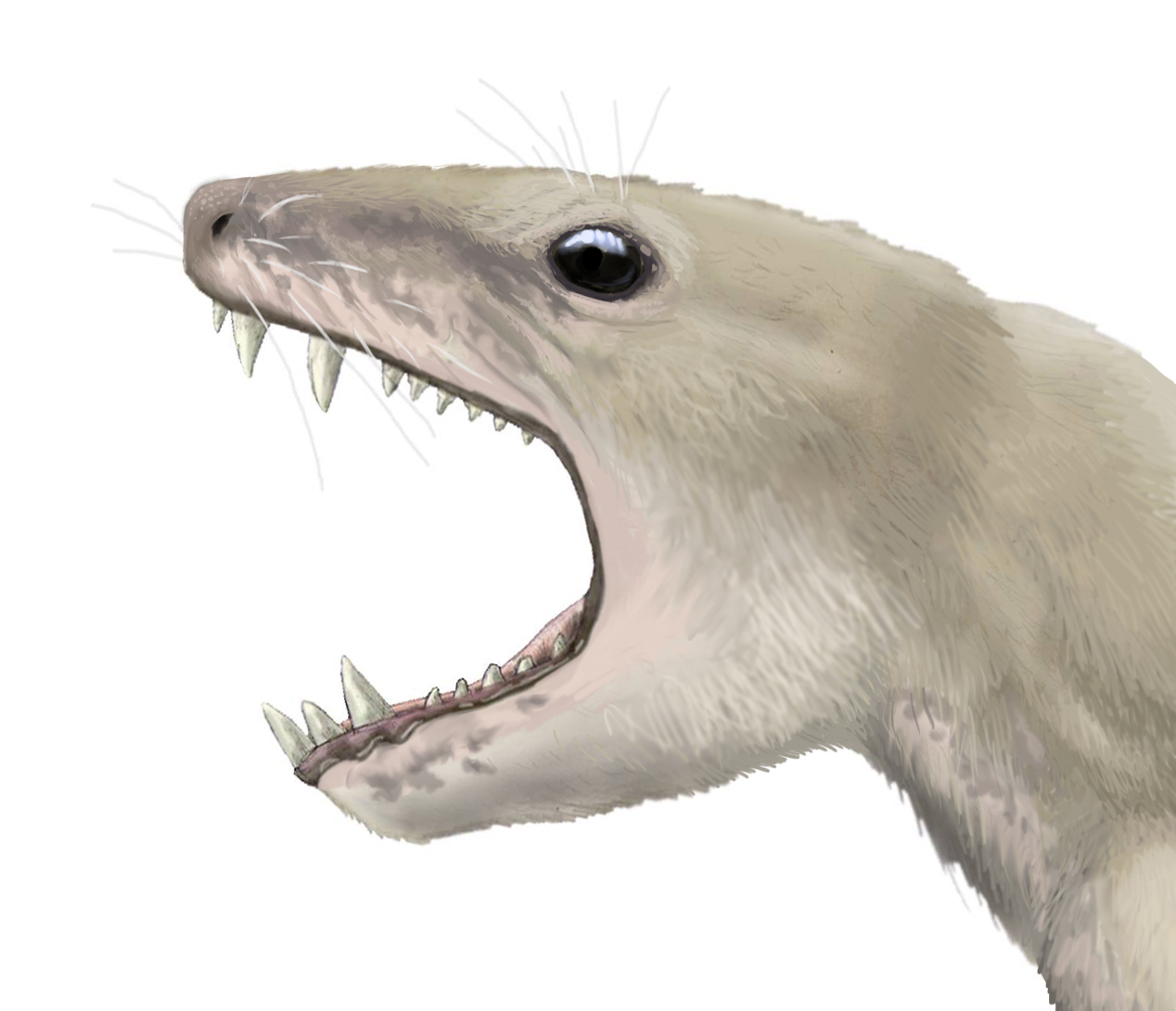
- Restoration of Pachygenelus monus

Scientific classification
- Kingdom: Animalia
- Phylum: Chordata
- Clade: Synapsida
- Clade: Therapsida
- Clade: Cynodontia
- Family: †Tritheledontidae
- Genus: †Pachygenelus; Watson, 1913

Species
- †P. monus Watson, 1913 (type); †P. milleri Chatterjee, 1983

= Pachygenelus =

Pachygenelus Temporal range: Early Jurassic

Extinct genus of cynodonts

Pachygenelus is a genus of extinct cynodont. Fossils have been found from the Karoo basin in South Africa and date back to the Early Jurassic.

The genus was named in 1913 on the basis of a partial lower jaw found from South Africa, with the type species being named P. monus. A new species, P. milleri, was named in 1983 and distinguished from the type species in possessing an accessory posterior cusp on the lower postcanines.

== Description ==
Pachygenelus had both an articular-quadrate and dentary-squamosal jaw joint characteristic of ictidosaurs. Only mammals possess the dentary-squamosal articulation, while all other tetrapods possess the typical arcticular-quadrate articulation. Thus the jaw of Pachygenelus can be seen as transitional between non-mammalian synapsids and true mammals. Another feature of Pachygenelus that is shared with mammals is plesiomorphic prismatic enamel, or enamel arranged into strengthened prisms. The upper and lower tooth rows occluded with one another, although not as close as what is seen in true mammals. Wear facets are present on the lingual sides of the upper and external faces of the lower postcanines and are seen as evidence for the occlusion. Despite all of the derived adaptation seen in its teeth, the dentition of Pachygenelus is believed to have been the least specialized of all tritheledontids.

== Taxonomy ==
The use of the family Tritheledontidae to include Pachygenelus and several other chiniquodontoids has been questioned, and it has been suggested that only Tritheledon meets the qualifications required for a true tritheledontid. The authors of the paper that first proposed the idea suggested that all other tritheledontids be reassigned to a new family called Pachygenelidae, named after Pachygenelus.

Pachygenelus in a cladogram after Stefanello et al. (2023):

- Probainognathia
  - Lumkuia
  - - Chiniquodon
    - Probainognathidae
    - - Ecteniniidae
      - - Protheriodon
        - Prozostrodontia
          - Prozostrodontidae
            - Prozostrodon
            - Pseudotherium
          - - Therioherpeton
            - - Irajatherium
              - - Riograndia
                - - - Diarthrognathus
                    - Pachygenelus
                  - - Tritylodontidae
                    - - Botucaraitherium
                      - - Brasilodon
                        - Mammaliaformes
