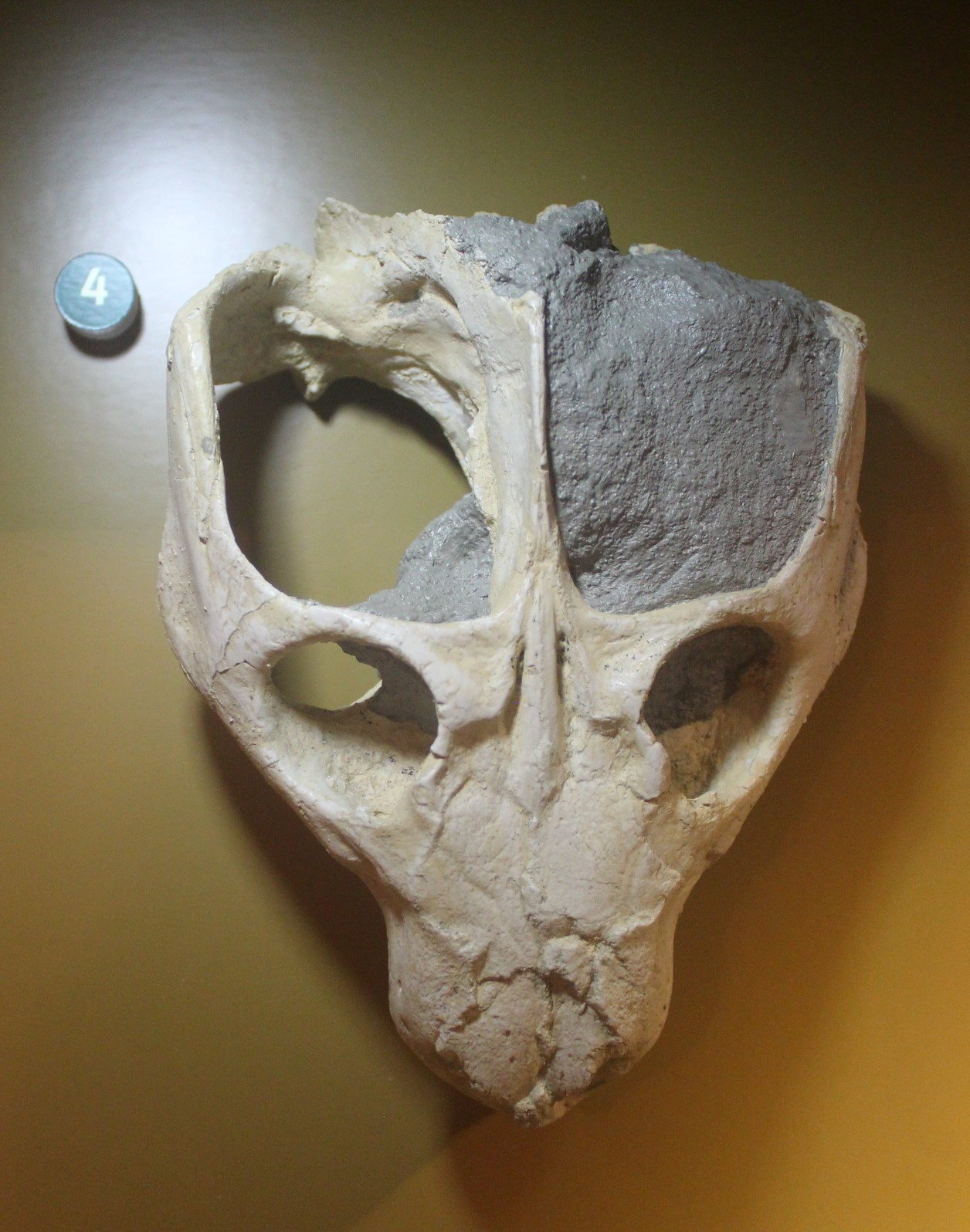
- Skull of Dadadon isaloi in the Field Museum of Natural History.

Scientific classification
- Domain: Eukaryota
- Kingdom: Animalia
- Phylum: Chordata
- Clade: Synapsida
- Clade: Therapsida
- Clade: Cynodontia
- Family: †Traversodontidae
- Subfamily: †Massetognathinae
- Genus: †Dadadon; Flynn et al., 2000

Species
- †D. isaloi Flynn et al., 2000 (type)

= Dadadon =

Dadadon Temporal range: Middle Triassic

Extinct genus of cynodonts

Dadadon is an extinct genus of traversodontid cynodonts which existed in Madagascar during the late Middle Triassic. The only species in the genus is Dadadon isaloi.
