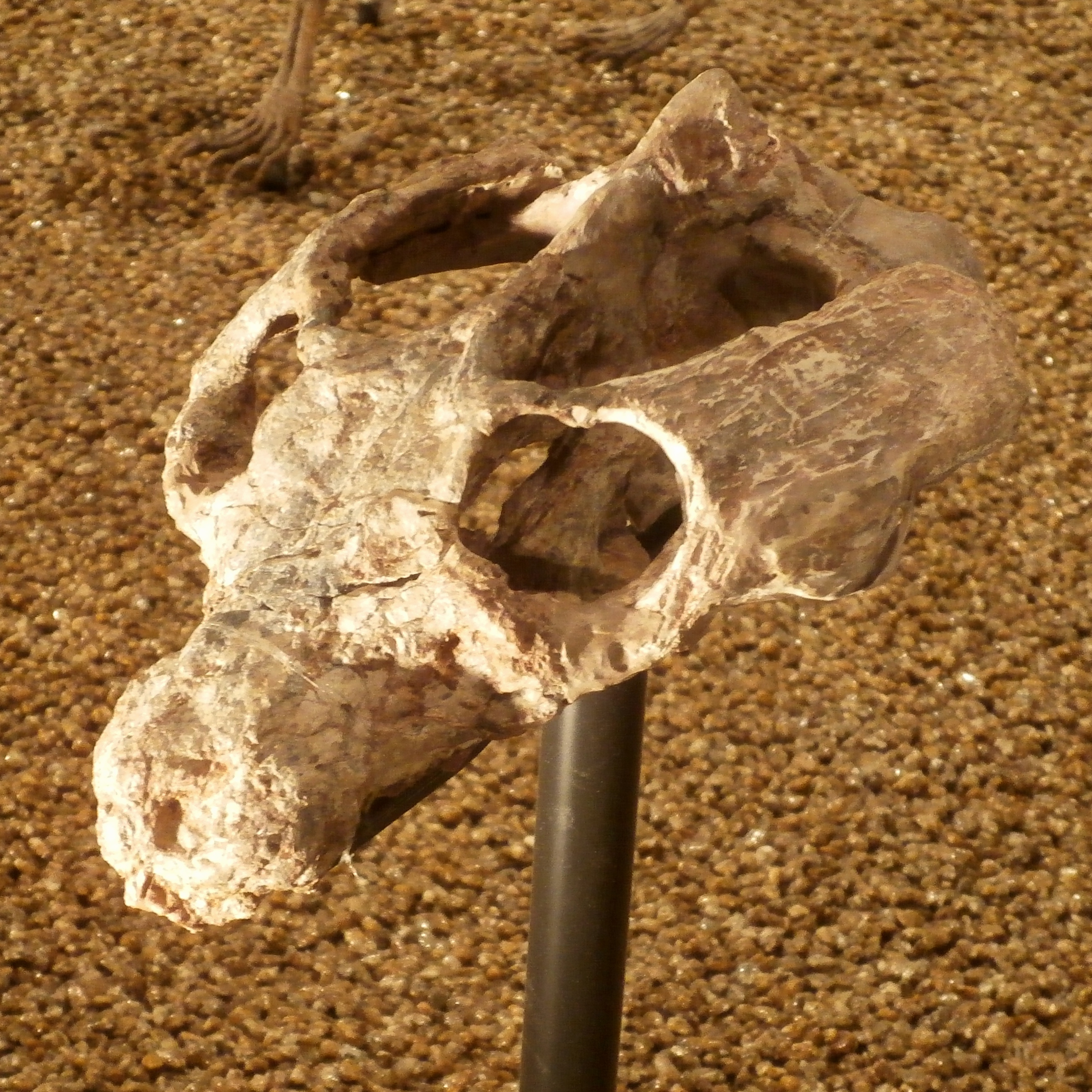
- Fossil of Traversodon sp.. Exhibit in the National Museum of Nature and Science, Tokyo, Japan.

Scientific classification
- Kingdom: Animalia
- Phylum: Chordata
- Clade: Synapsida
- Clade: Therapsida
- Clade: Cynodontia
- Family: †Traversodontidae
- Subfamily: †Traversodontinae
- Genus: †Traversodon von Huene, 1936

Species
- †T. stahleckeri von Huene, 1936 (type)

= Traversodon =

Traversodon Temporal range: Late Triassic

Extinct genus of cynodonts

Traversodon is an extinct genus of cynodonts. It was a relative of the ancestor to modern mammals.

Traversodon lived in what is now South America.

== Species ==
Traversodon stahleckeri was first found by Friedrich von Huene in 1936 in the Geopark of Paleorrota, São Pedro do Sul, Brazil.
