= Tritheledon =

Tritheledon Temporal range: Early Jurassic ~201.6–189.6 Ma

Scientific classification
- Kingdom: Animalia
- Phylum: Chordata
- Clade: Synapsida
- Clade: Therapsida
- Clade: Cynodontia
- Family: †Tritheledontidae
- Genus: †Tritheledon; Broom 1912
- Species: †T. riconoi

Binomial name
- †Tritheledon riconoi Broom 1912

Extinct genus of cynodonts

Tritheledon is an extinct genus of cynodonts that lived during the Lower Jurassic. Fossils were found in the Elliot Formation, South Africa. Like all cynodonts, it had many traits shared by mammals. Tritheledonts were probably insectivores, and nocturnal animals.
