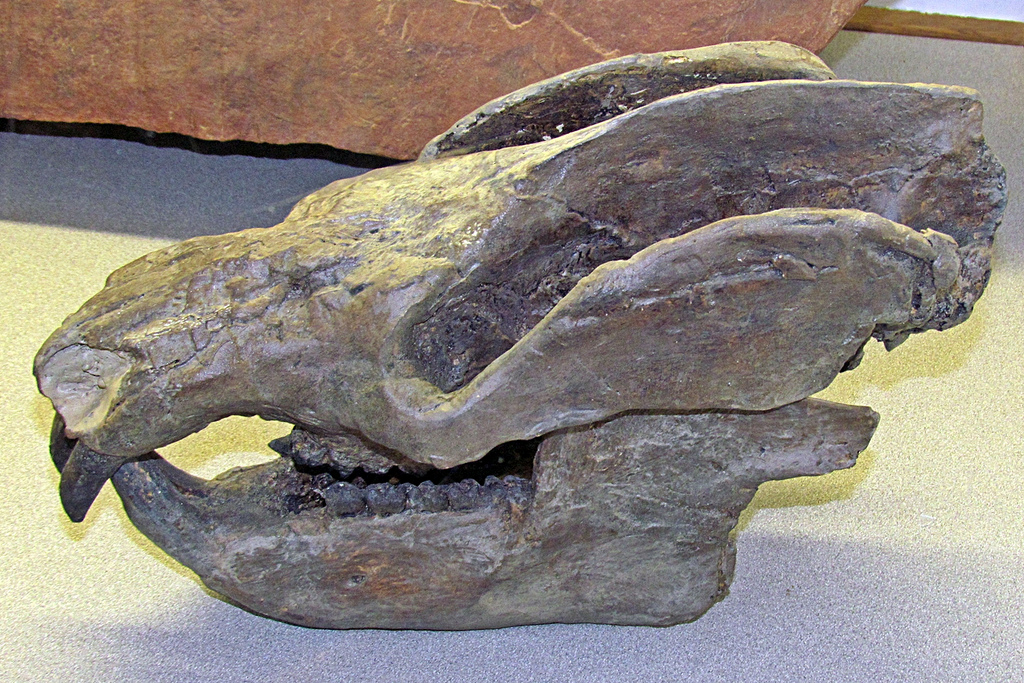
- Skull of K. wellesi

Scientific classification
- Kingdom: Animalia
- Phylum: Chordata
- Clade: Synapsida
- Clade: Therapsida
- Clade: Cynodontia
- Family: †Tritylodontidae
- Genus: †Kayentatherium; Kermack, 1982

Type species
- †Kayentatherium wellesi Kermack, 1982

Synonyms
- Nearctylodon broomi Lewis, 1986

= Kayentatherium =

Kayentatherium Temporal range: Early Jurassic

Extinct genus of mammaliamorphs

Kayentatherium is an extinct genus of tritylodontid cynodonts that lived during the Early Jurassic. It is one of two tritylodonts from the Kayenta Formation of northern Arizona, United States.

Kayentatherium means "Kayenta Beast", and is named for the geological formation in which it was found, the Kayenta Formation. Kayentatherium is known from several specimens. The specific name honors paleontologist Samuel Welles, who worked with the University of California Museum of Paleontology in much of the pioneering work on the paleontology of the Kayenta Formation.

== History ==
The first tritylodontid material found within the Kayenta Formation was collected by members of the United States Geological Survey in 1953. Further material was collected in 1977 and 1982 by a team led by Farish Jenkins. Also found in the same rocks were Dinnebitodon amarali and Nearctylodon broomi, but the latter was later considered to be a juvenile specimen of Kayentatherium, and so was synonymised.

== Description ==
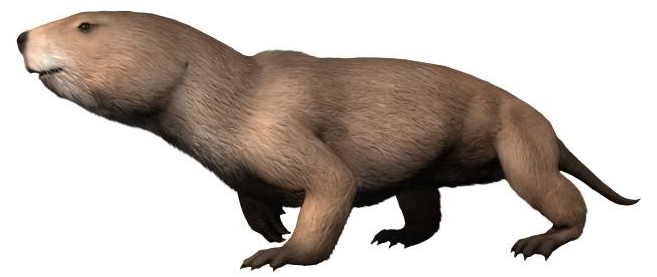
Artist's restoration of K. wellesi

It was about a meter long, the skull was over 20 centimetres (7.9 in) in length. It was a robust and stocky animal with a large head and stout backbone. Some researchers think it might have been semi-aquatic, with adaptations formerly thought to indicate digging habits now interpreted as specialisation towards limb-powered swimming. Slight flattening and flaring of the tail vertebrae also suggest specialisms for a semi-aquatic ecology. If this was the case, it would be one of the earliest examples of semi-aquatic specialism in mammaliamorphs in the mammal fossil record.

== Reproduction ==
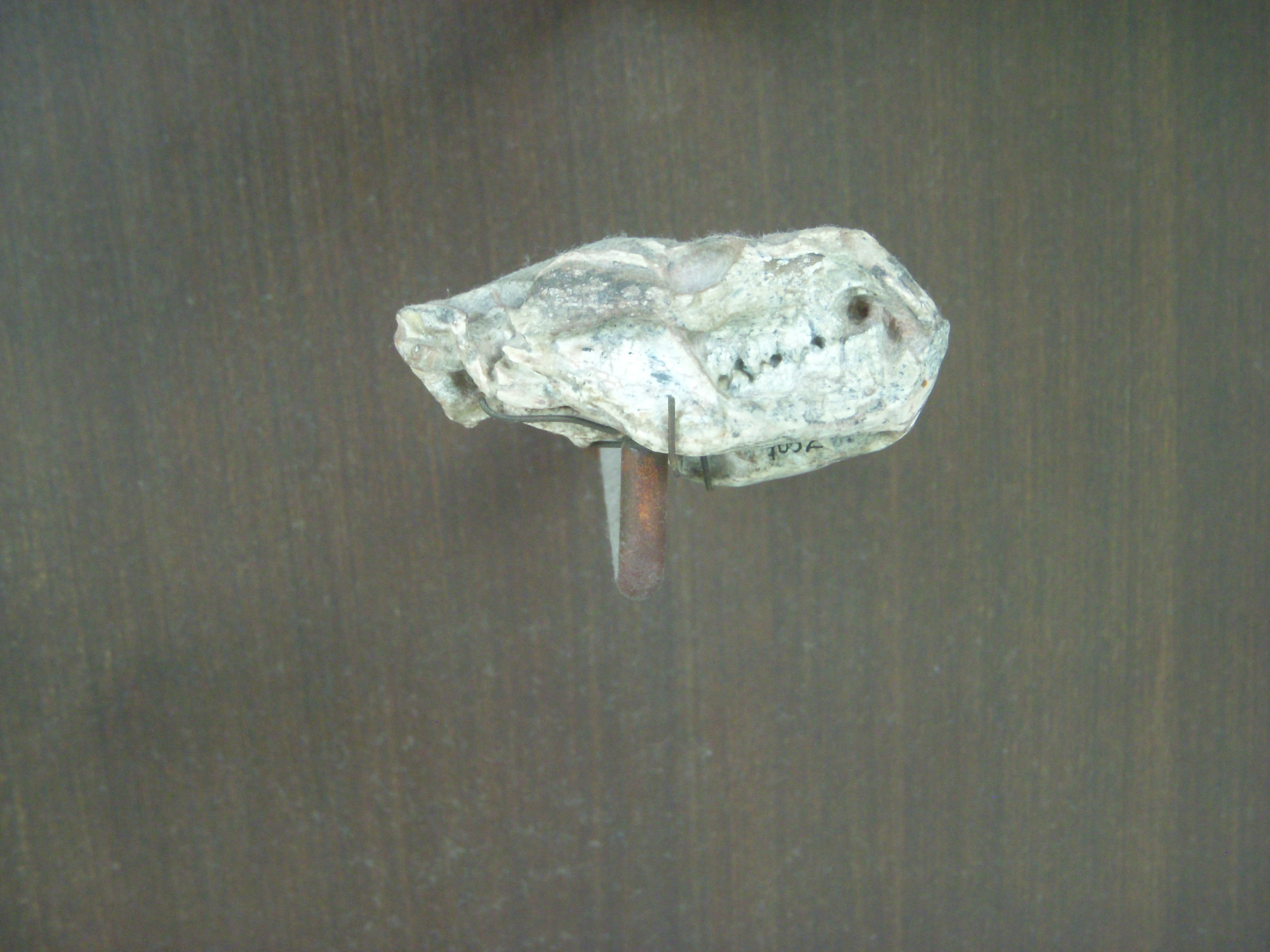
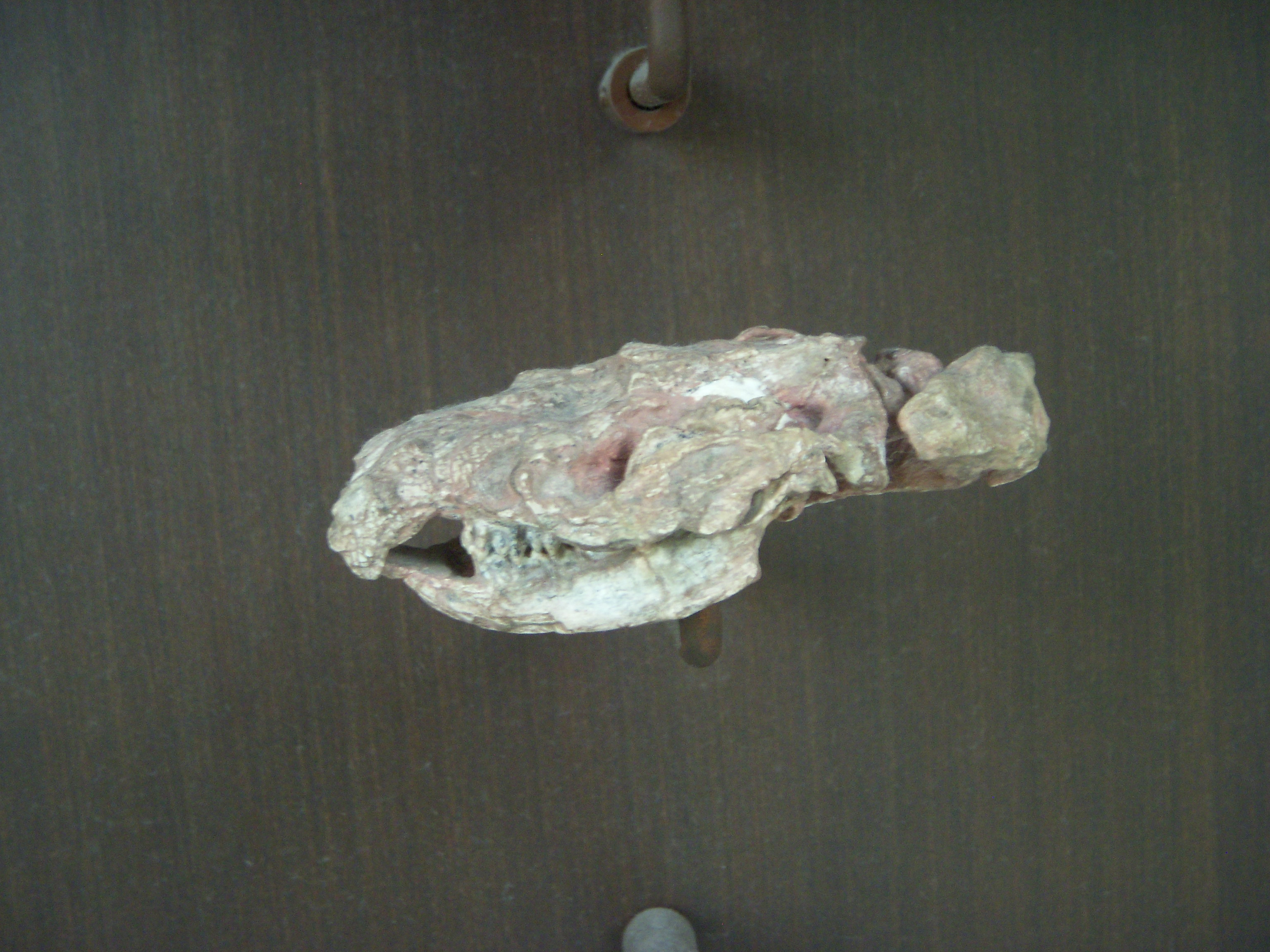
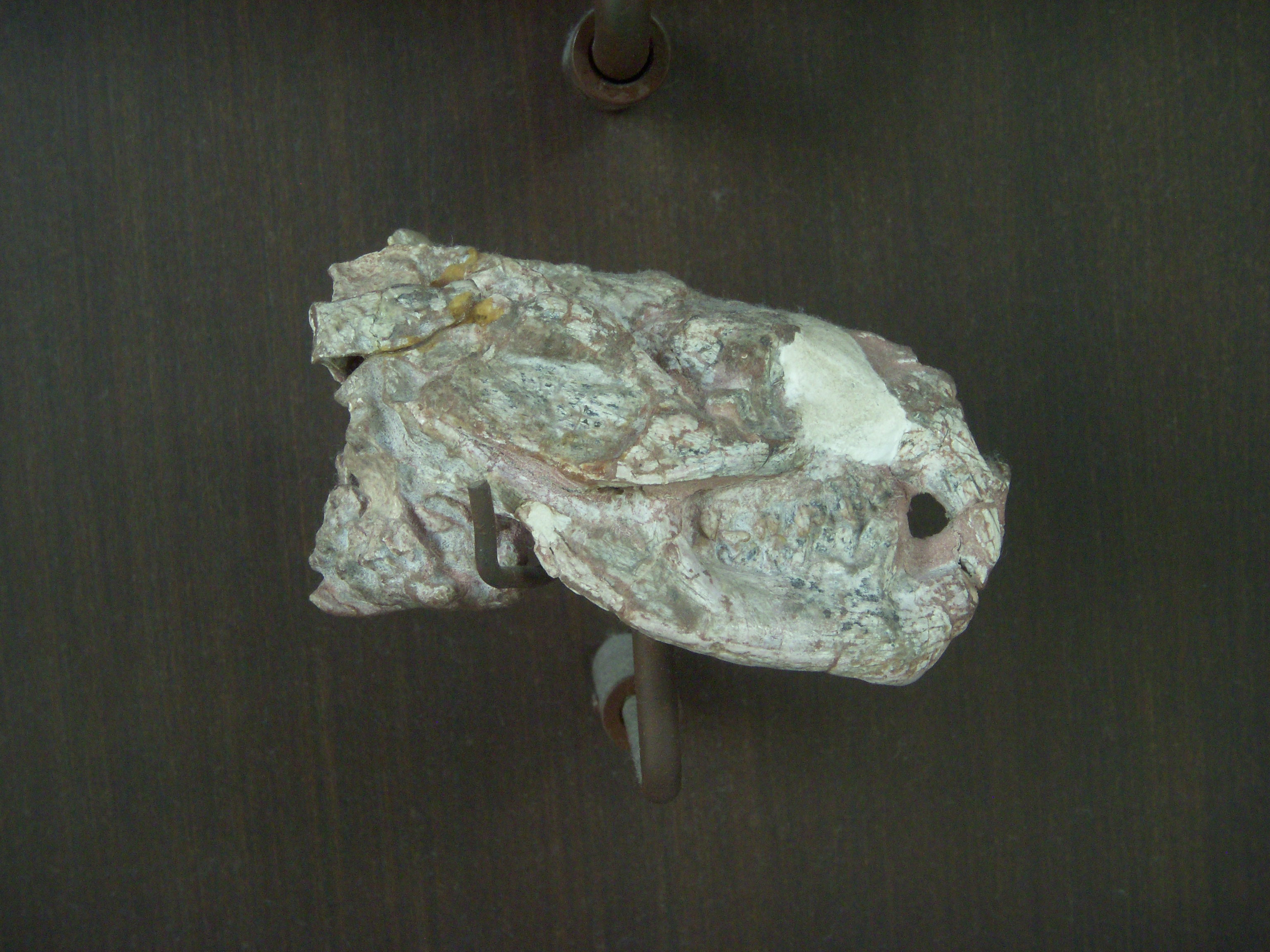
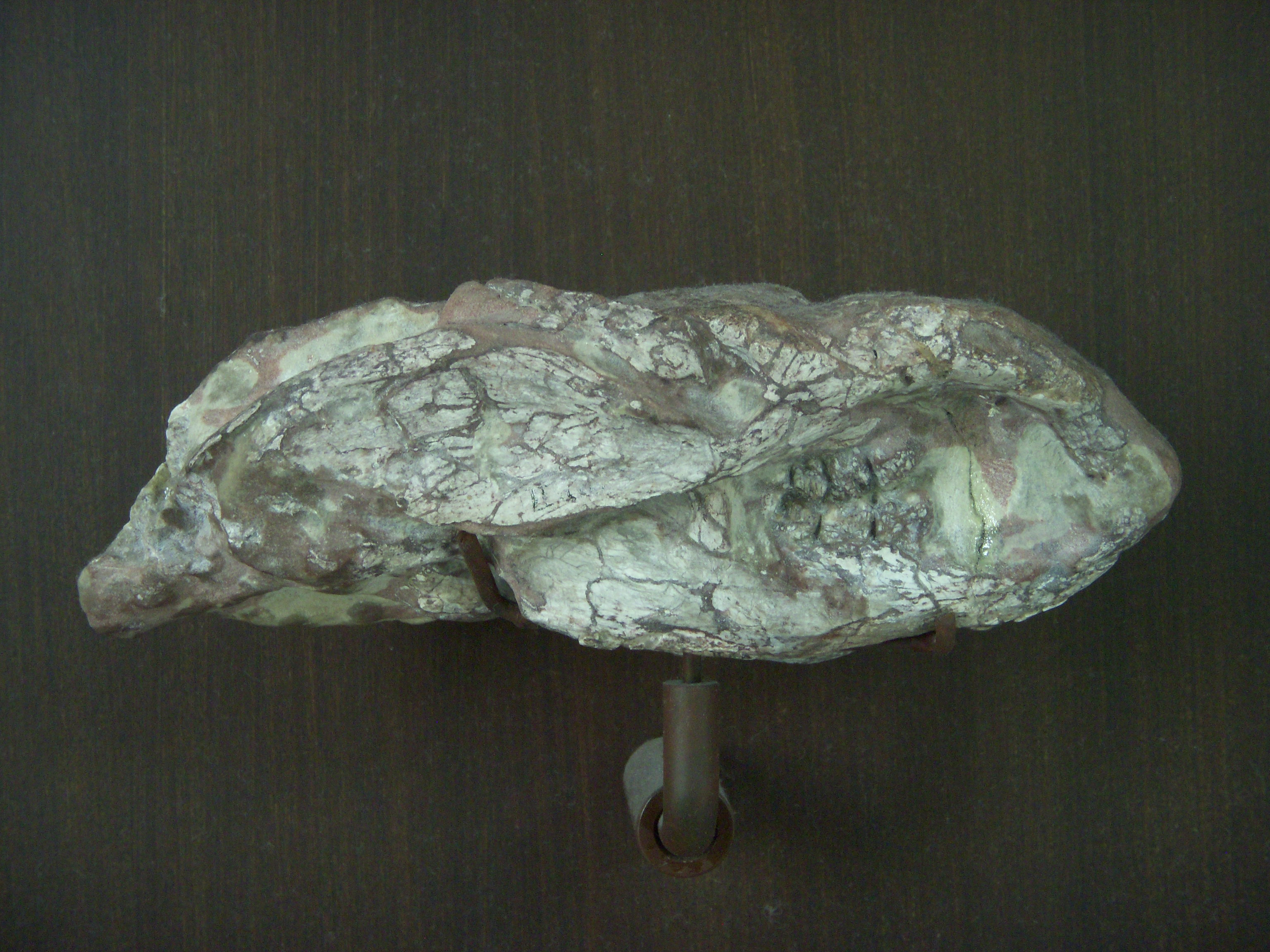
Skulls of Kayentatherium sp. in the American Museum of Natural History showing a growth series from young to adult.

A find in 2000 of Kayentatherium wellesi from the Kayenta formation of Arizona was examined by microCT scan, and revealed an adult with at least 38 perinates, a number considerably higher than any living mammal litter. The size of the group suggests a clutch of eggs. Perinates had similar skull proportions to adults, with well-developed teeth, and may have been able to fend for themselves at birth. Allometric study shows that tritylodontids had proportionally smaller brains at this stage than mammal perinates, which supports the hypothesis that the evolution of larger brain size in early mammals was associated with changes in reproductive strategy to invest more parental energy in a smaller number of offspring.

== See also ==
- Dinnebitodon
- Oligokyphus
- Tritylodontidae
