= Perinate =

A perinate refers to a member of a viviparous species from approximately one month before birth to one month after it. The term is derived from the Latin root perinatus, meaning "around birth." In medical and biological contexts, it specifically denotes the period surrounding childbirth, including the final weeks of gestation and the first days of life.

== Related ==
- Fetus
- Neonate
- Prenatal and perinatal psychology
