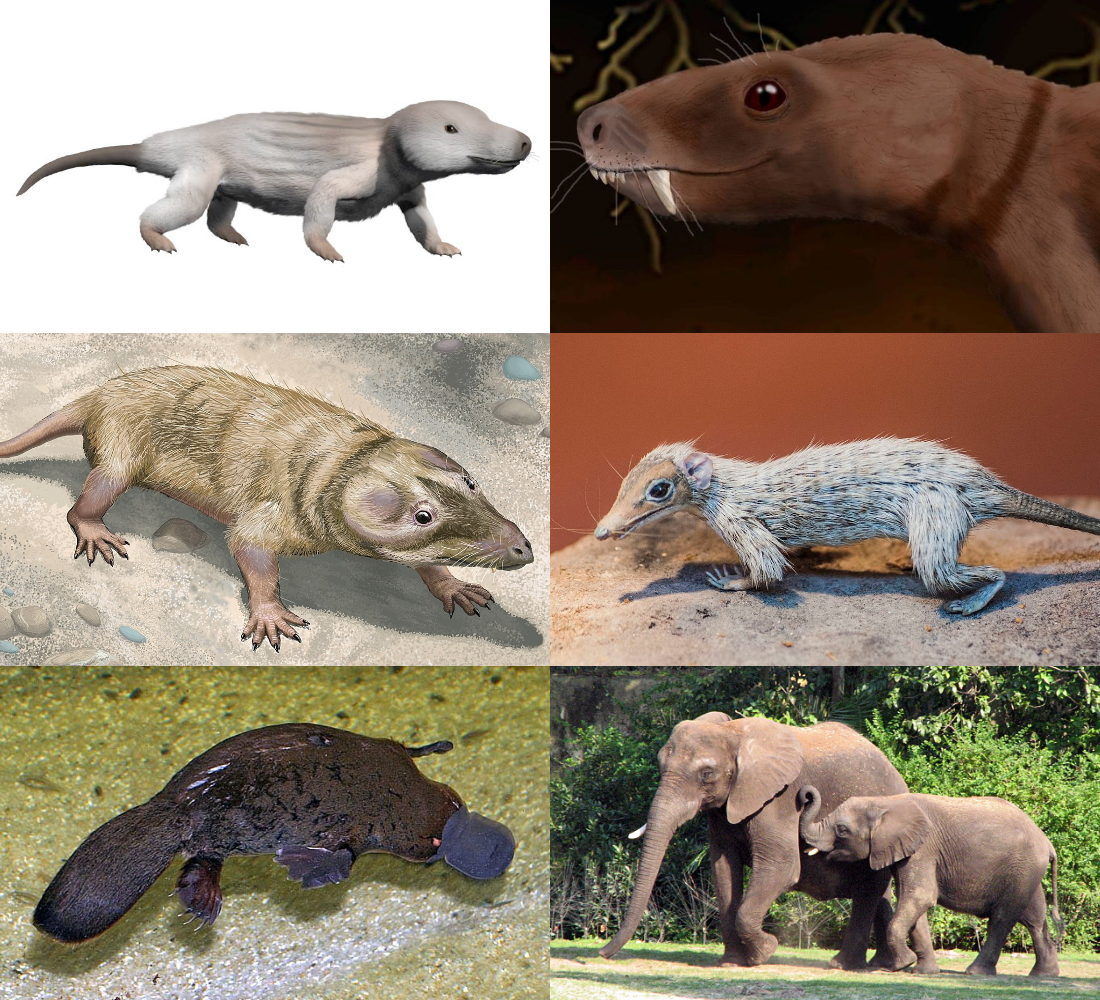
- Examples of cynodonts. 1st row: Dvinia prima, Trirachodon berryi; 2nd row: Brasilitherium riograndensis, Megazostrodon rudnerae; 3rd row: Ornithorhynchus anatinus (platypus), Loxodonta africana (African bush elephant).

Scientific classification
- Kingdom: Animalia
- Phylum: Chordata
- Clade: Synapsida
- Clade: Therapsida
- Clade: Eutheriodontia
- Clade: Cynodontia; Owen, 1861

Clades
- †Dvinia; †Madysaurus; †Charassognathidae; †Procynosuchidae; Epicynodontia

= Cynodontia =

Cynodontia Temporal range: Late Permian-Recent, 260–0 Ma

Clade of therapsids

Cynodontia (from Ancient Greek κύων (kúōn) 'dog' and ὀδούς (odoús) 'tooth') is a clade of eutheriodont therapsids that first appeared in the Late Permian (approximately 260 mya), and extensively diversified after the Permian–Triassic extinction event. Mammals are cynodonts, as are their extinct ancestors and close relatives (Mammaliaformes), having evolved from advanced probainognathian cynodonts during the Late Triassic.

Non-mammalian cynodonts occupied a variety of ecological niches, both as carnivores and as herbivores. Following the emergence of mammals, most other cynodont lines went extinct, with the last known non-mammaliaform cynodont group, the Tritylodontidae, having its youngest records in the Early Cretaceous.

== Etymology and description ==
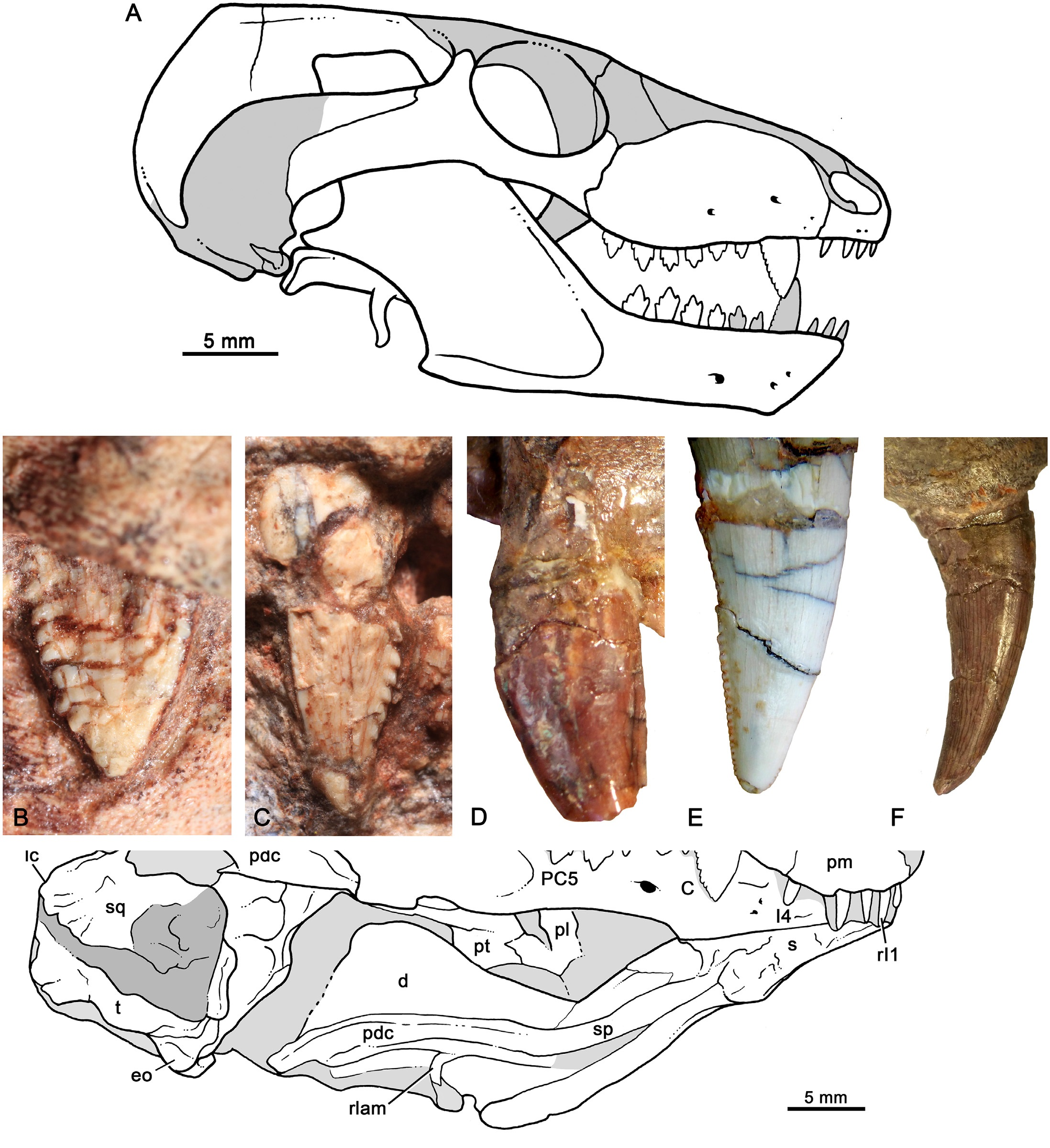
Skull of Bonacynodon and a comparison of various cynodont canine teeth

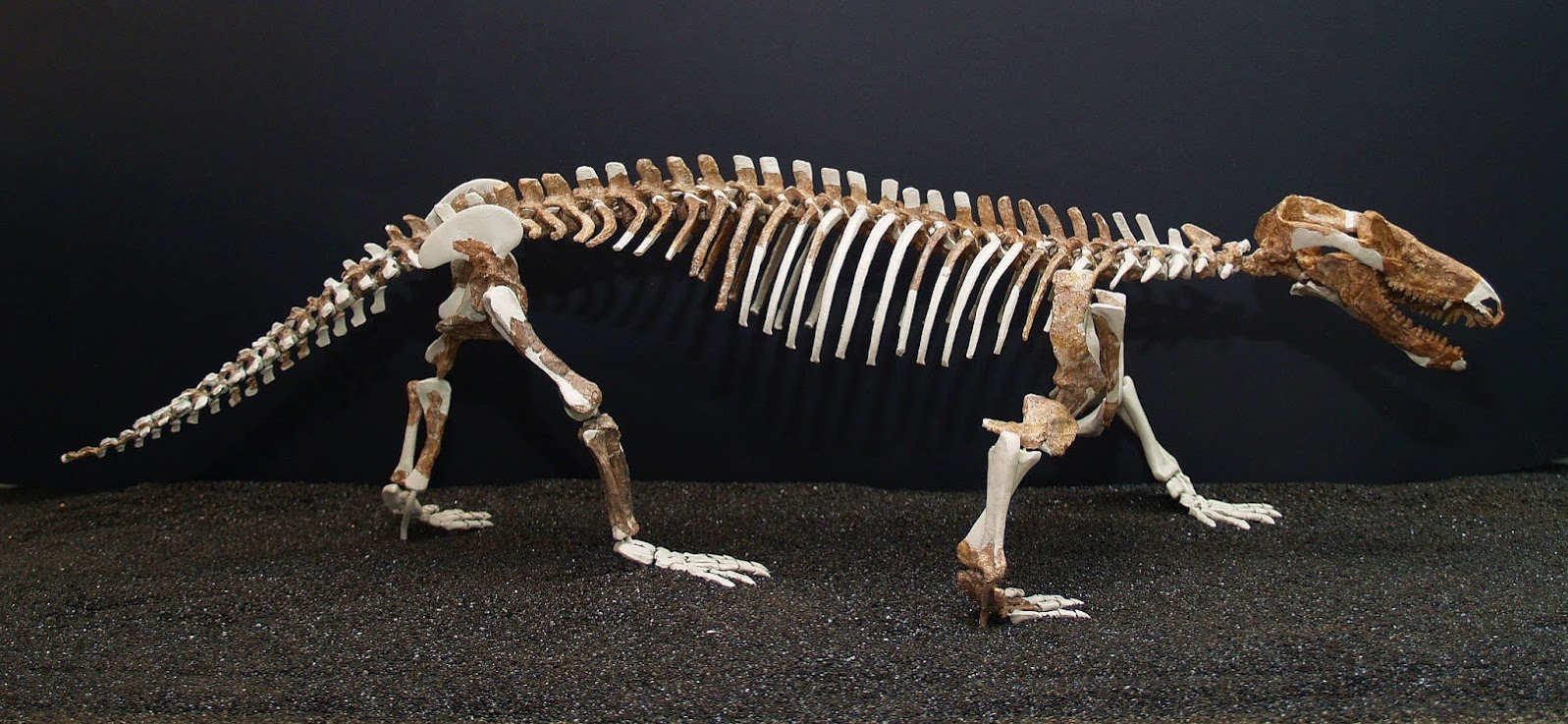
Skeleton of Procynosuchus

The name "Cynodontia" (literally "dog tooth") was given by Richard Owen in 1861, in which he noted their distinctive pair of canine-like upper teeth (which are ancestrally present in all therapsids) that he noted as similar to those of living carnivoran mammals.

Early cynodonts have many of the skeletal characteristics of mammals. The teeth were fully differentiated and the braincase bulged at the back of the head. Outside of some crown-group mammals (notably the therians), all cynodonts probably laid eggs. The temporal fenestrae were much larger than those of their ancestors, and the widening of the zygomatic arch in a more mammal-like skull would have allowed for more robust jaw musculature. They also have the secondary palate that other primitive therapsids lacked, except the therocephalians, who were the closest relatives of cynodonts. (However, the secondary palate of cynodonts primarily comprises the maxillae and palatines as in mammals, whereas the secondary palate of the therocephalians primarily comprises the maxillae and the vomer.)

The palatine teeth on the roof of the mouth present in other therapsids were lost in the ancestor of cynodonts. The dentary was the largest bone in their lower jaw.

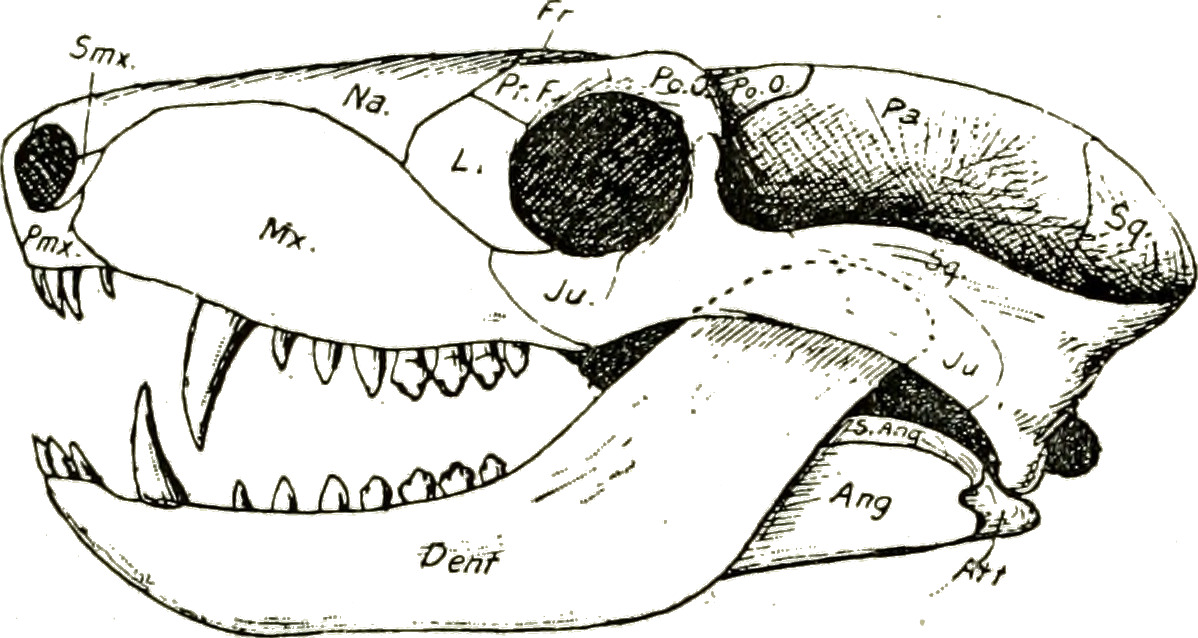
Skull of Thrinaxodon

The cynodonts probably had some form of warm-blooded metabolism. This has led to many reconstructions of cynodonts as having fur. Being endothermic they may have needed it for thermoregulation, but fossil evidence of their fur (or lack thereof) has been elusive. Modern mammals have Harderian glands secreting lipids to coat their fur, but the telltale imprint of this structure is found only from the primitive mammal Morganucodon and onwards. Fur was already unambiguously present present in Mammaliaformes as indicated in its presence in the Jurassic docodont Castorocauda.

Skull of Morganucodon, a member of Mammaliaformes

Early cynodonts had numerous small foramina on their snout bones, similar to reptiles. This suggests that they had immobile, non-muscular lips like those of lizards, and lacked muscular cheeks. As a muscular, mobile face is necessary to perform whisking movements and to avoid damage to whiskers, it is unlikely that early cynodonts had whiskers. In prozostrodontian cynodonts, the group that includes mammals, the foramina are replaced by a single large infraorbital foramen, which indicates that the face had become muscular and that whiskers would have been present.

Derived cynodonts developed epipubic bones. These served to strengthen the torso and support abdominal and hindlimb musculature, aiding them in the development of an erect gait, but at the expense of prolonged pregnancy, forcing these animals to give birth to highly altricial young as in modern marsupials and monotremes. Only placentals, and perhaps Megazostrodon and Erythrotherium, would lose these. A specimen of Kayentatherium does indeed demonstrate that at least tritylodontids already had a fundamentally marsupial-like reproductive style, but produced much higher litters at around 38 perinates or possibly eggs.

Cynodonts are the only known synapsid lineage to have produced aerial locomotors, with gliding being known in haramiyidans and various mammal groups, and placental mammals having developed flight.

The largest known non-mammalian cynodont is Scalenodontoides, a traversodontid, which has been estimated to have a maximum skull length of approximately 617 millimetres (24.3 in) based on a fragmentary specimen.

== Evolutionary history ==
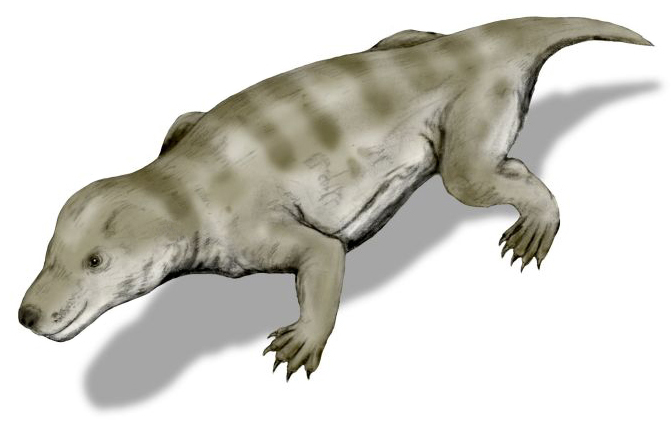
Thrinaxodon from the Early Triassic of South Africa

The closest relatives of cynodonts are therocephalians, with which they form the clade Eutheriodontia.

The earliest cynodonts are known early Lopingian (early Wuchiapingian) aged sediments of the Tropidostoma Assemblage Zone, in the Karoo Supergroup of South Africa, belonging to the basal family Charassognathidae. Fossils of Permian cynodonts are relatively rare outside of South Africa, with the most widely distributed genus being Procynosuchus, which is known from South Africa, Germany, Tanzania, Zambia, and possibly Russia.

Cynodonts expanded rapidly in diversity after the Permian–Triassic extinction event. Peak disparity in cynodonts occurred from the Induan to the Carnian and in the middle Norian. Post-Early Triassic cynodonts were dominated by members of the advanced clade Eucynodontia, which has two main subdivisions, the predominantly herbivorous Cynognathia and the predominantly carnivorous Probainognathia. During the Early and Middle Triassic, cynodont diversity was dominated by members of Cynognathia, and members of Probainognathia would not become prominent until the Late Triassic (early Norian). Almost all Middle Triassic cynodonts are known from Gondwana, with only one genus (Nanogomphodon) having been found in the Northern Hemisphere. Among the most dominant groups of Middle and Late Triassic cynodonts is the herbivorous Traversodontidae, predominantly in Gondwana, which reached a peak diversity in the Late Triassic. Mammaliaformes originated from probainognathian cynodonts during the Late Triassic. Early Mammaliaformes were small bodied insectivores. Only two groups of non-mammaliaform cynodonts existed beyond the end of the Triassic, both belonging to Probainognathia. The first is the insectivorous Tritheledontidae, which briefly lasted into the Early Jurassic. The second is the herbivorous Tritylodontidae, which first appeared in the latest Triassic, which were abundant and diverse during the Jurassic, predominantly in the Northern Hemisphere, persisted into the Early Cretaceous (Barremian-Aptian) in Asia, at least until around 120 million years ago, as represented by Fossiomanus from China.

During their evolution, the number of cynodont jaw bones reduced. This move towards a single bone for the mandible paved the way for other bones in the jaw, the articular and angular, to migrate to the cranium, where they function as parts of the mammalian hearing system.

Cynodonts also developed a secondary palate in the roof of the mouth. This caused air flow from the nostrils to travel to a position in the back of the mouth instead of directly through it, allowing cynodonts to chew and breathe at the same time. This characteristic is present in all mammals.

== Taxonomy ==
Richard Owen named Cynodontia in his 1861 work Palaeontology, or a Systematic Summary of Extinct Animals and their Geological Relations, which he assigned to Anomodontia as a family. Robert Broom (1913) reranked Cynodontia as an infraorder, since retained by others, including Colbert and Kitching (1977), Carroll (1988), Gauthier et al. (1989), and Rubidge and Cristian Sidor (2001). Olson (1966) assigned Cynodontia to Theriodontia, Colbert and Kitching (1977) to Theriodontia, and Rubridge and Sidor (2001) to Eutheriodontia. William King Gregory (1910), Broom (1913), Carroll (1988), Gauthier et al. (1989), Hopson and Kitching (2001) and Botha et al. (2007) all considered Cynodontia as belonging to Therapsida. Botha et al. (2007) seems to have followed Owen (1861), but without specifying taxonomic rank.

=== Phylogeny ===
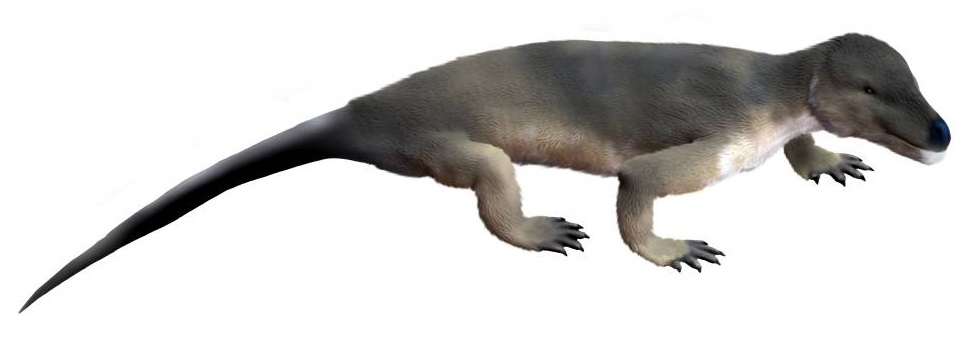
Procynosuchus

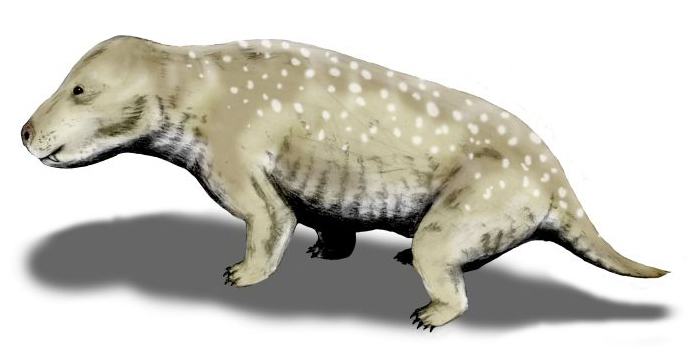
Exaeretodon

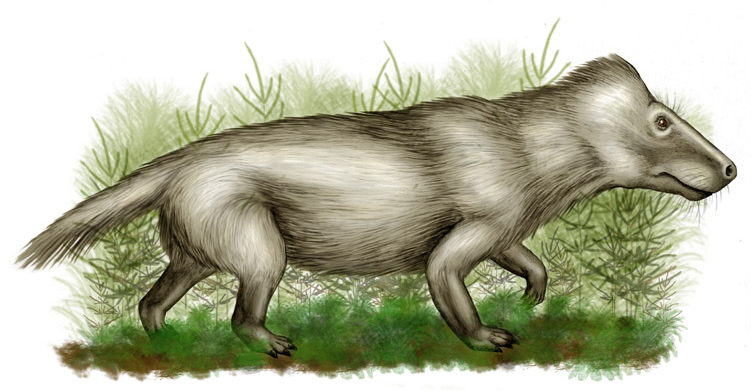
Diademodon

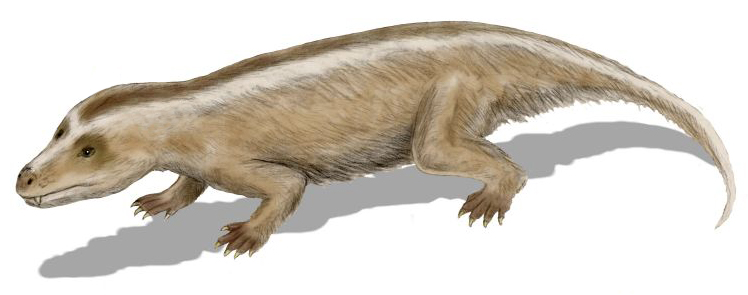
Tritylodon

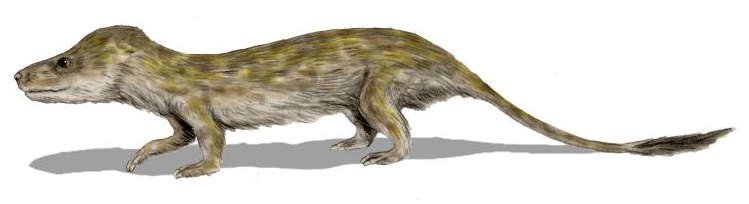
Oligokyphus

Below is a cladogram from Ruta, Botha-Brink, Mitchell and Benton (2013) showing one hypothesis of cynodont relationships:

- Cynodontia
  - †Charassognathus
  - - - †Dvinia
      - †Procynosuchus
    - Epicynodontia
      - †Cynosaurus
      - - - †Galesaurus
          - †Progalesaurus
        - - - †Nanictosaurus
            - †Thrinaxodon
          - - †Platycraniellus
            - Eucynodontia
              - †Cynognathia
                - †Cynognathus
                - †Gomphodontia
                  - †Diademodon
                  - - †Trirachodontidae
                      - - †Beishanodon
                        - †Sinognathus
                      - - †Trirachodon
                        - - †Cricodon
                          - †Langbergia
                    - †Traversodontidae
                      - - †Andescynodon
                        - †Pascualgnathus
                      - - †Scalenodon
                        - - †Luangwa
                          - - †Traversodon
                            - - - †"Scalenodon" attridgei
                                - - †Mandagomphodon
                                  - - †Nanogomphodon
                                    - - †Arctotraversodon
                                      - †Boreogomphodon
                              - - †Massetognathinae
                                  - †Massetognathus
                                  - - †Dadadon
                                    - †Santacruzodon
                                - †Gomphodontosuchinae
                                  - †Menadon
                                  - - †Gomphodontosuchus
                                    - - †Protuberum
                                      - - †Exaeretodon
                                        - †Scalenodontoides
              - Probainognathia
                - †Lumkuia
                - - †Ecteninion
                  - - - †Aleodon
                      - †Chiniquodon
                    - - †Probainognathus
                      - - †Trucidocynodon
                        - - †Therioherpeton
                          - - †Tritheledontidae
                              - †Riograndia
                              - - - †Chaliminia
                                  - †Elliotherium
                                - - †Diarthrognathus
                                  - †Pachygenelus
                            - - †Brasilodontidae
                                - †Brasilitherium
                                - †Brasilodon
                              - - †Tritylodontidae
                                  - †Oligokyphus
                                  - - †Kayentatherium
                                    - - †Tritylodon
                                      - †Beinotherium
                                - Mammaliaformes
                                  - Mammalia
                                  - †Sinoconodon
                                  - †Morganucodon

== Distribution ==
Non-mammalian cynodonts have been found in South America, India, Africa, Antarctica, Asia, Europe, and North America.

== See also ==
- Permian–Triassic extinction event
- Prehistoric mammal
- Tetrapod
- Triassic-Jurassic extinction event
