= Elliotherium =

Elliotherium Temporal range: Late Triassic

Scientific classification
- Kingdom: Animalia
- Phylum: Chordata
- Clade: Synapsida
- Clade: Therapsida
- Clade: Cynodontia
- Family: †Tritheledontidae
- Genus: †Elliotherium; Sidor 2006

Extinct genus of cynodonts

Elliotherium is an extinct genus of cynodonts which existed in South Africa during the upper Triassic period. The type species is Elliotherium kersteni, named after the Elliot Formation in which the fossils were found.
