= Diarthrognathus =

Diarthrognathus Temporal range: 201–189 Ma Lower Jurassic

Scientific classification
- Domain: Eukaryota
- Kingdom: Animalia
- Phylum: Chordata
- Clade: Synapsida
- Clade: Therapsida
- Clade: Cynodontia
- Family: †Tritheledontidae
- Genus: †Diarthrognathus; Crompton, 1958
- Species: †D. broomi

Binomial name
- †Diarthrognathus broomi Crompton, 1958

Extinct genus of cynodonts

Diarthrognathus ("Two joint jaw") is an extinct genus of tritheledontid cynodonts, known from fossil evidence found in South Africa and first described in 1958 by A.W. Crompton. The creature lived during the Early Jurassic period, about 200 million years ago. It was carnivorous and small, slightly smaller than Thrinaxodon, which was under 50 centimetres (20 in) long.

Diarthrognathus possesses a jaw structure that is similar to both mammals and more basal synapsids. Its primitive jaw joint is located between the quadrate and articular bones, and its derived, mammalian jaw joint is located between the squamosal and dentary bones.

The articular and quadrate bones evolved to become two of the middle-ear bones in mammals. The transition exemplified by Diarthrognathus suggests that natural selection favoured animals with a more powerful bite.

At one time, Diarthrognathus was thought to be synonymous with Pachygenelus. However, in 1980, newly discovered fossils revealed sufficient differences to warrant separate genera.

The double jaw joint of Diarthrognathus neatly bridges early synapsids and mammals, and thus rebuts a claim by creationists, such as Duane Gish, who thought such a transition was impossible. This "twin-jointed jaw" can also be seen in other derived cynodonts, such as early mammaliaforms.
