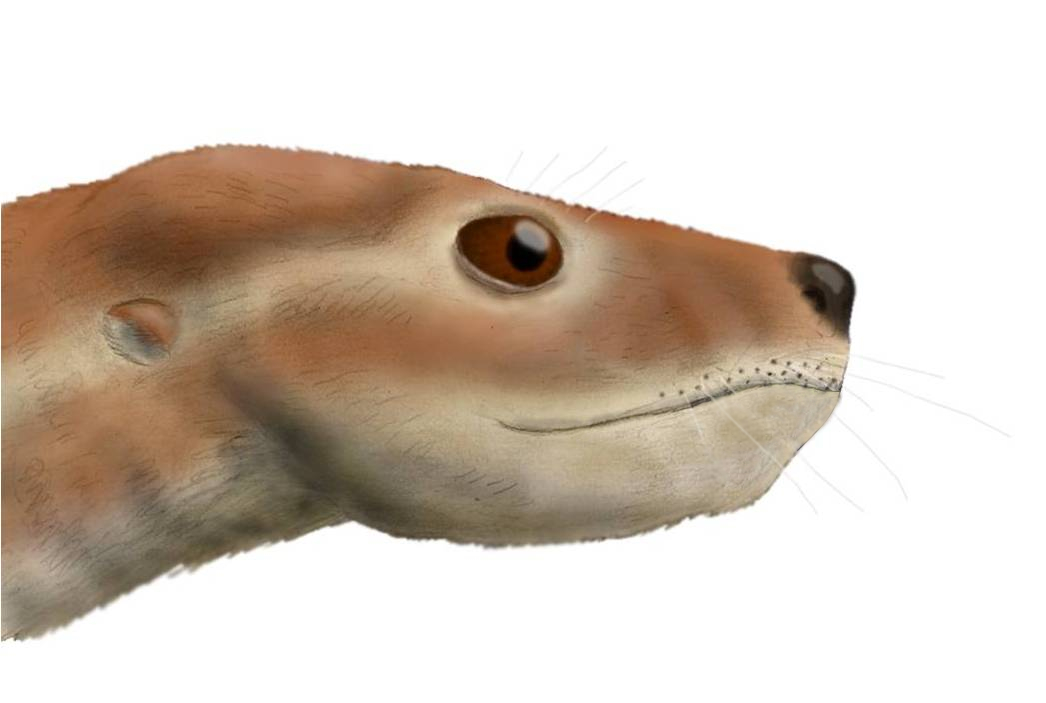
- Life restoration

Scientific classification
- Kingdom: Animalia
- Phylum: Chordata
- Clade: Synapsida
- Clade: Therapsida
- Clade: Cynodontia
- Clade: Probainognathia
- Family: †Lumkuiidae; Hopson and Kitching, 2001
- Genus: †Lumkuia; Hopson and Kitching, 2001
- Species: †L. fuzzi

Binomial name
- †Lumkuia fuzzi Hopson and Kitching, 2001

= Lumkuia =

Lumkuia Temporal range: Anisian, 247.2–242.0 Ma

Extinct genus of cynodonts

Lumkuia is an extinct genus of cynodont, fossils of which have been found in the Cynognathus Assemblage Zone of the Beaufort Group in the South African Karoo Basin that date back to the early Middle Triassic. It contains a single species, Lumkuia fuzzi, which was named in 2001 on the basis of the holotype specimen BP/1/2669, which can now be found at the Bernard Price Institute in Johannesburg, South Africa. The genus has been placed in its own family, Lumkuiidae. Lumkuia is not as common as other cynodonts from the same locality such as Diademodon and Trirachodon.

== Discovery and naming ==
The holotype and only known specimen of Lumkuia, BP/1/2669, was found by Paul Reubsamen near the Lumku Mission in the Eastern Cape province, close to the small town of Lady Frere. It was collected from rocks belonging to the subzone B of the Cynognathus Assemblage Zone. It consists of a well-preserved skull, part of the shoulder girdle (including the left scapulocoracoid, the left and a partial right clavicle, and the interclavicle), 10 dorsal vertebrae with ribs, 8 caudal (tail) vertebrae, and a nearly complete left forelimb. The specimen was stored in the fossil collection of the Bernard Price Institute of Johannesburg, where it was originally listed as a juvenile of Trirachodon, a basal member of Gomphodontia. However, in 1988 the American palaeontologist James A. Hopson noted several traits that it shared with Probainognathus and the chiniquodontids, members of a more mammal-like clade of cynodonts that would later be named Probainognathia.

In 2001 Hopson, joined by James W. Kitching, formally described the specimen as the new taxon Lumkuia fuzzi. The generic name comes from the Lumku Mission, near which the holotype was found. The specific name honours the South African palaeontologist Alfred W. "Fuzz" Crompton. Hopson and Kitching gave the skull a detailed description, but the postcranial elements were described only in superficial terms. In 2022 the specimen, including the postcranium, was given a more comprehensive redescription by Julien Benoit and colleagues, based on data gained from synchrotron X-ray computed tomography.

== Description ==
The postcanines are similar to those of the later chiniquodontids, but the secondary palate is quite short in comparison, and the genus lacks the angulation of the ventral cranial margin seen in chiniquodontids. Lumkuia can be seen as more derived than other contemporary cynodonts such as Cynognathus with the crowns of its teeth high and narrow and having inwardly curving tops.

== Classification ==
- Eucynodontia
  - Probainognathia
    - Lumkuia
    - - Ecteninion
      - - - Probelesodon
          - - Chiniquodon
            - Aleodon
        - - Probainognathus
          - - Pachygenelus
            - Morganucodon
  - Cynognathia

Cladogram after Hopson & Kitching (2001)

Lumkuia was first described in 2001 by the palaeontologists Hopson and Kitching, who considered it to be the most basal member of Probainognathia; this placement has been supported by several later studies. A 2010 phylogenetic analysis by Liu and Olsen, and multiple later analyses based on the same data matrix, have instead placed it outside the clade formed by Cynognathia and Probainognathia. However, during a 2022 redescription of Lumkuia, new anatomical characters found during the study were incorporated into the Liu & Olsen (2010) matrix, which led to Lumkuia being unambiguously recovered as a basal probainognathian. Before the discovery of Lumkuia, the earliest known probainognathians were from younger strata in Africa and South America that were deposited in the late Middle and Late Triassic.

== Palaeobiology ==
Lumkuia was facultatively fossorial, as its forelimbs displayed adaptations for scratch-digging. It used a sprawling locomotory mode.
