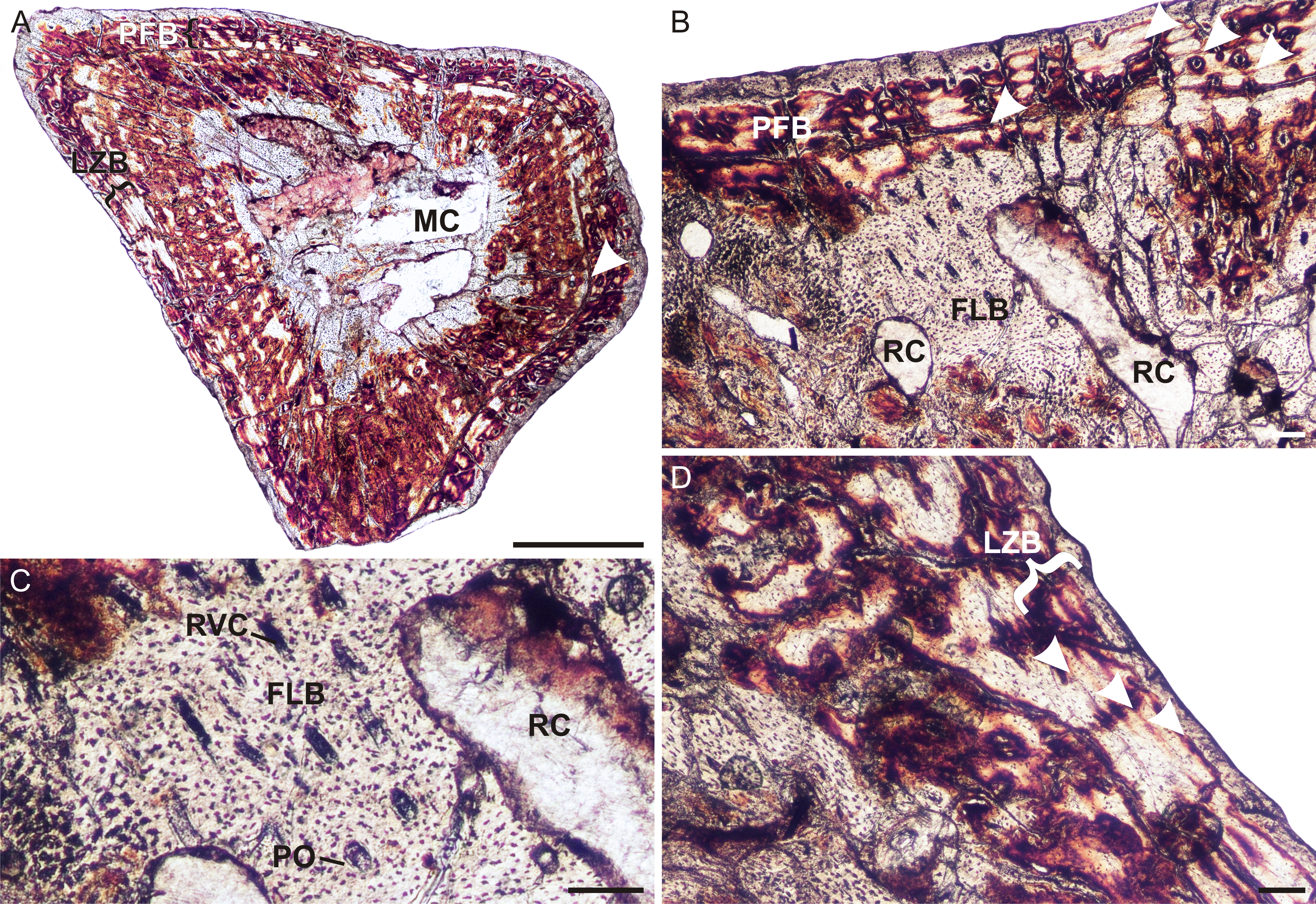
- Humeral osteohistology of I. hernandezi

Scientific classification
- Domain: Eukaryota
- Kingdom: Animalia
- Phylum: Chordata
- Clade: Synapsida
- Clade: Therapsida
- Clade: Cynodontia
- Family: †Tritheledontidae
- Genus: †Irajatherium; Bonaparte 2005

Type species
- Irajatherium hernandezi Bonaparte 2005

Species
- I. hernandezi Bonaparte 2005

= Irajatherium =

Irajatherium Temporal range: Late Triassic ~221.5–205.6 Ma

Extinct genus of cynodonts

Irajatherium is an extinct genus of cynodonts, known only of the type species Irajatherium hernandezi. It is named in honor of Irajá Damiani Pinto.

== Species ==
Irajatherium hernandezi is a species known only by a humerus, a femur, two jaws and an upper arch incomplete, has the upper canine teeth after pills across and the post-mandibular canines with a more developed central cusp, followed by three smaller ones. It was collected in the Candelária Formation in the municipality of Faxinal do Soturno in the Paraná Basin of southeastern Brazil.
