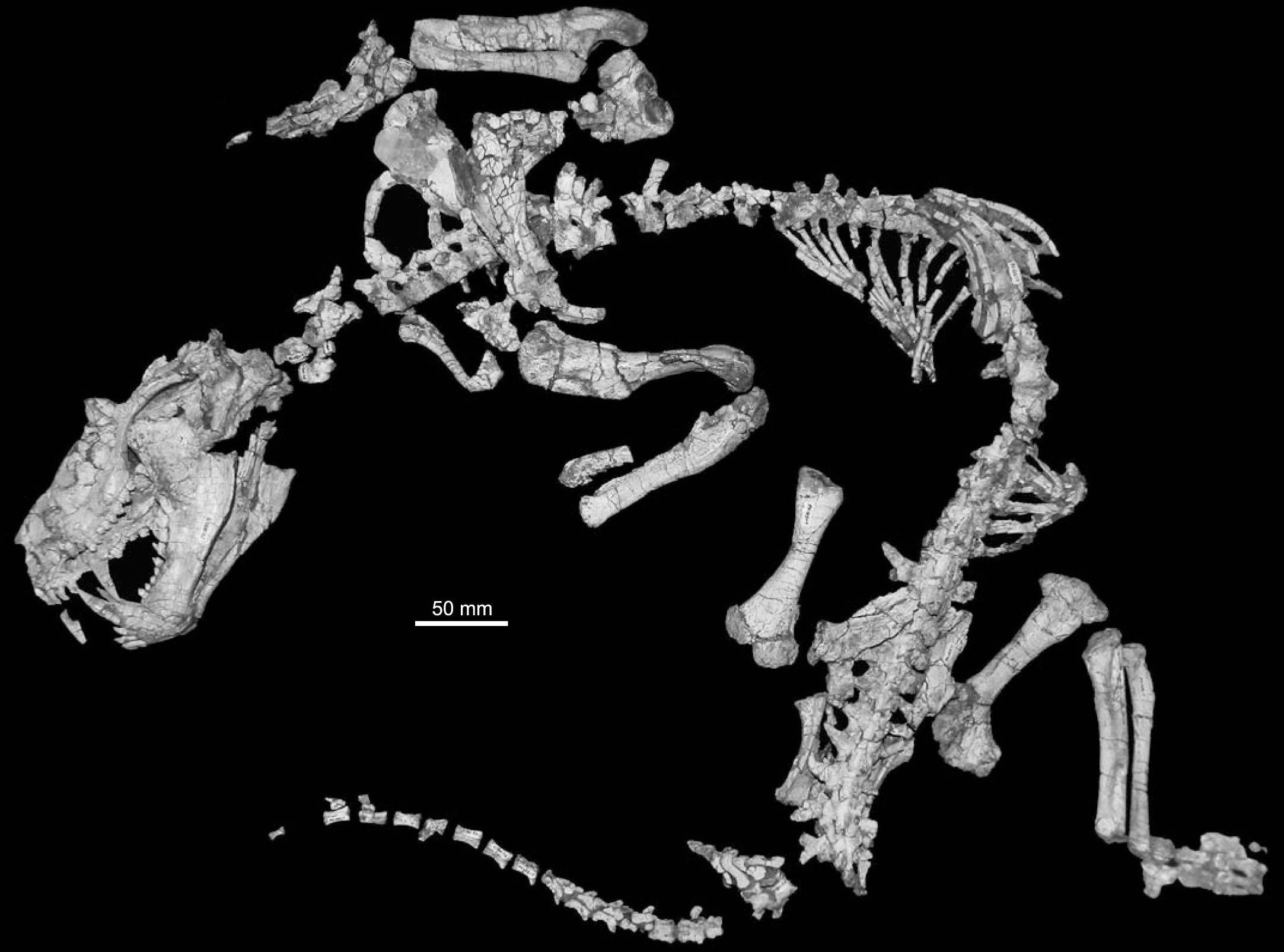
- Holotype skeleton UFRGS PV-1051-T
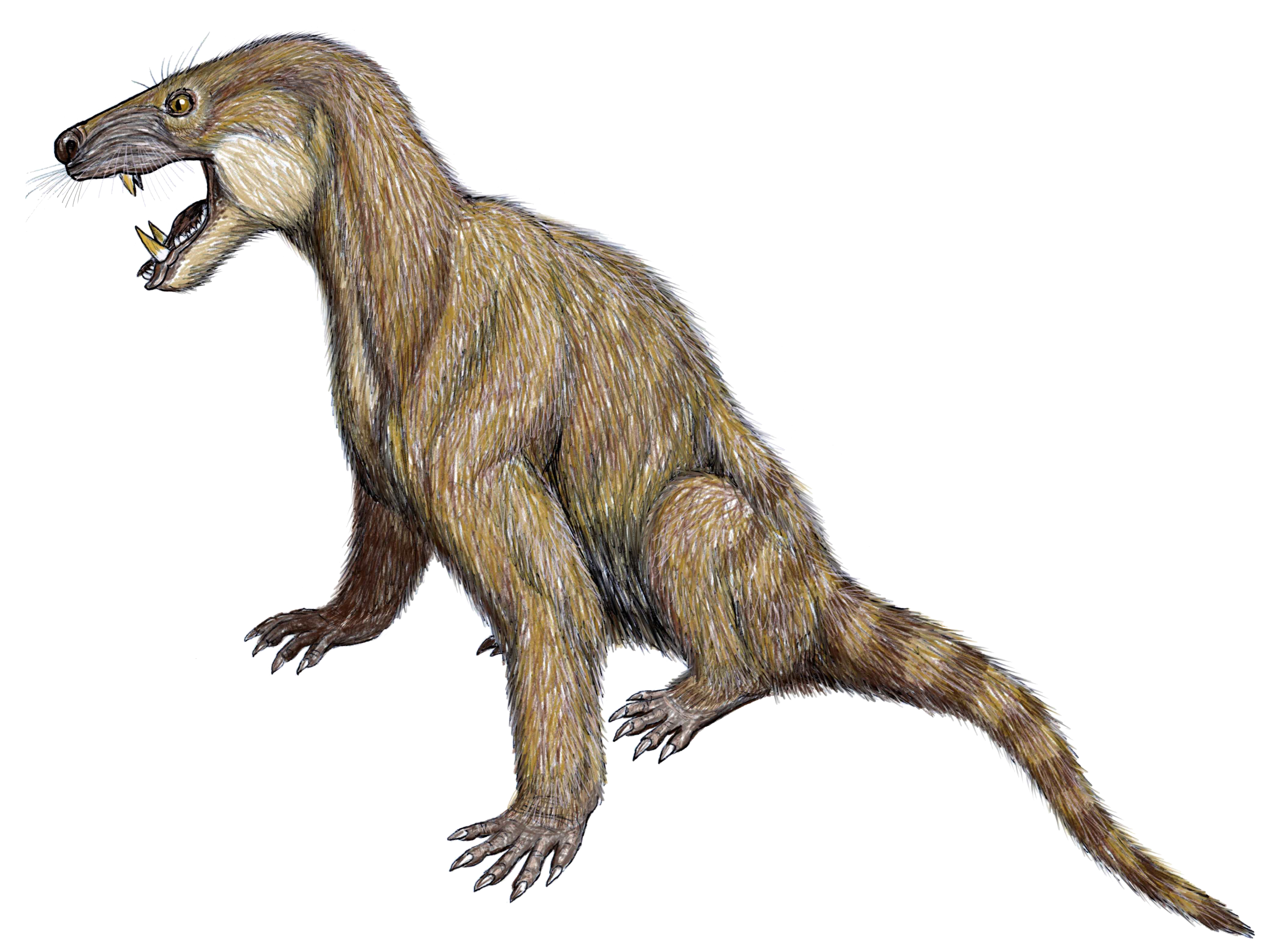
- Life restoration

Scientific classification
- Kingdom: Animalia
- Phylum: Chordata
- Clade: Synapsida
- Clade: Therapsida
- Clade: Cynodontia
- Family: †Ecteniniidae
- Genus: †Trucidocynodon; Oliveira et al. 2010
- Species: †T. riograndensis

Binomial name
- †Trucidocynodon riograndensis Oliveira et al. 2010

= Trucidocynodon =

Trucidocynodon Temporal range: Late Triassic, 230 Ma

Extinct genus of cynodonts

Trucidocynodon is an extinct genus of ecteniniid cynodonts from the Upper Triassic (Carnian) of Brazil. It is a monotypic genus that contains a single species, Trucidocynodon riograndensis. Fossils of Trucidocynodon were discovered in outcrops of the Upper Santa Maria Formation in Paleorrota Geopark, Agudo. Trucidocynodon is one of the most completely known Triassic cynodonts, as its holotype is a nearly complete and fully articulated skeleton.

== Description ==
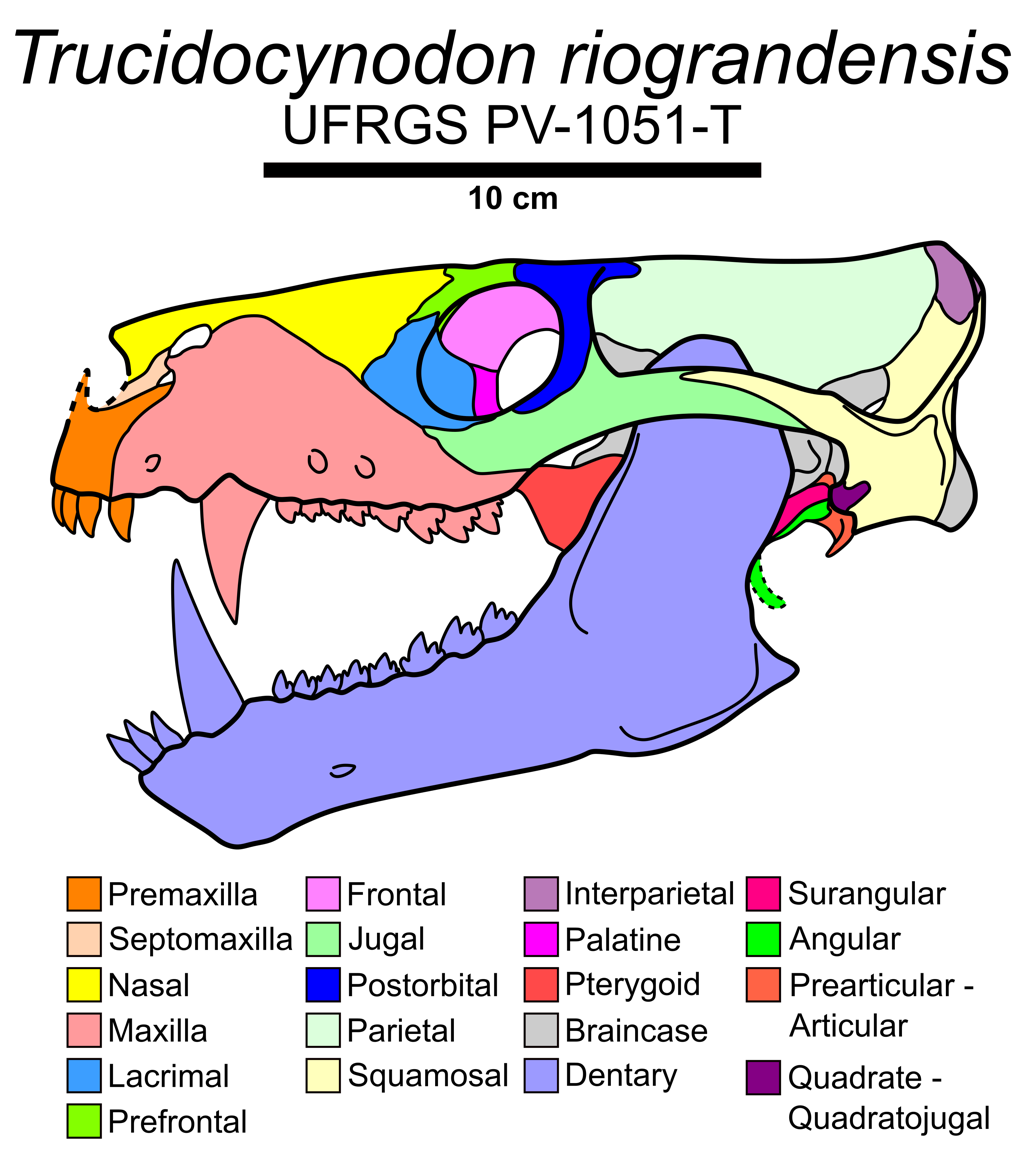
Skull diagram with bones labelled

T. riograndensis was a carnivorous cynodont closely related to Ecteninion lunensis and Diegocanis eleganus, from the Upper Triassic Ischigualasto Formation of Argentina. It differed from other ecteniniids in several respects, including its larger size. The holotype skeleton has a skull around 18.8 centimetres (7.4 inches) in length and a total body length of around 1.2 metres (3.9 feet). The holotype, UFRGS PV-1051-T, is accessioned at the Federal University of Rio Grande do Sul (UFRGS) alongside four paratypes based on postcranial fossils. A second skull was described in 2018 from the same site. This referred skull, CAPPA/UFSM 0029, was 17% larger than that of the holotype. Trucidocynodon is considered one of the largest known carnivorous cynodonts from the Triassic, as well as one of the largest probainognathians in the entire Mesozoic.

== Paleobiology ==
A biomechanical study has argued that Trucidocynodon not only had erect limbs, but that it also possibly had digitigrade forelimbs, being among the first synapsids to show adaptations for cursoriality. However, it was likely not a specialized runner, unlike ungulates and some other modern cursorial mammals.

T. riograndensis was a predator. It likely killed its prey by targeting the throat and suffocating its prey. Because a full neck clamp would have been impossible to use on adult individuals of most of the species that were potential prey items for T. riograndensis due to the predator's limited gape, it would thus have been a killing method that the ecteniniid employed only on juveniles.

== See also ==
- List of therapsids
