= Freshwater marsh =

Non-tidal, non-forested marsh wetland that contains fresh water

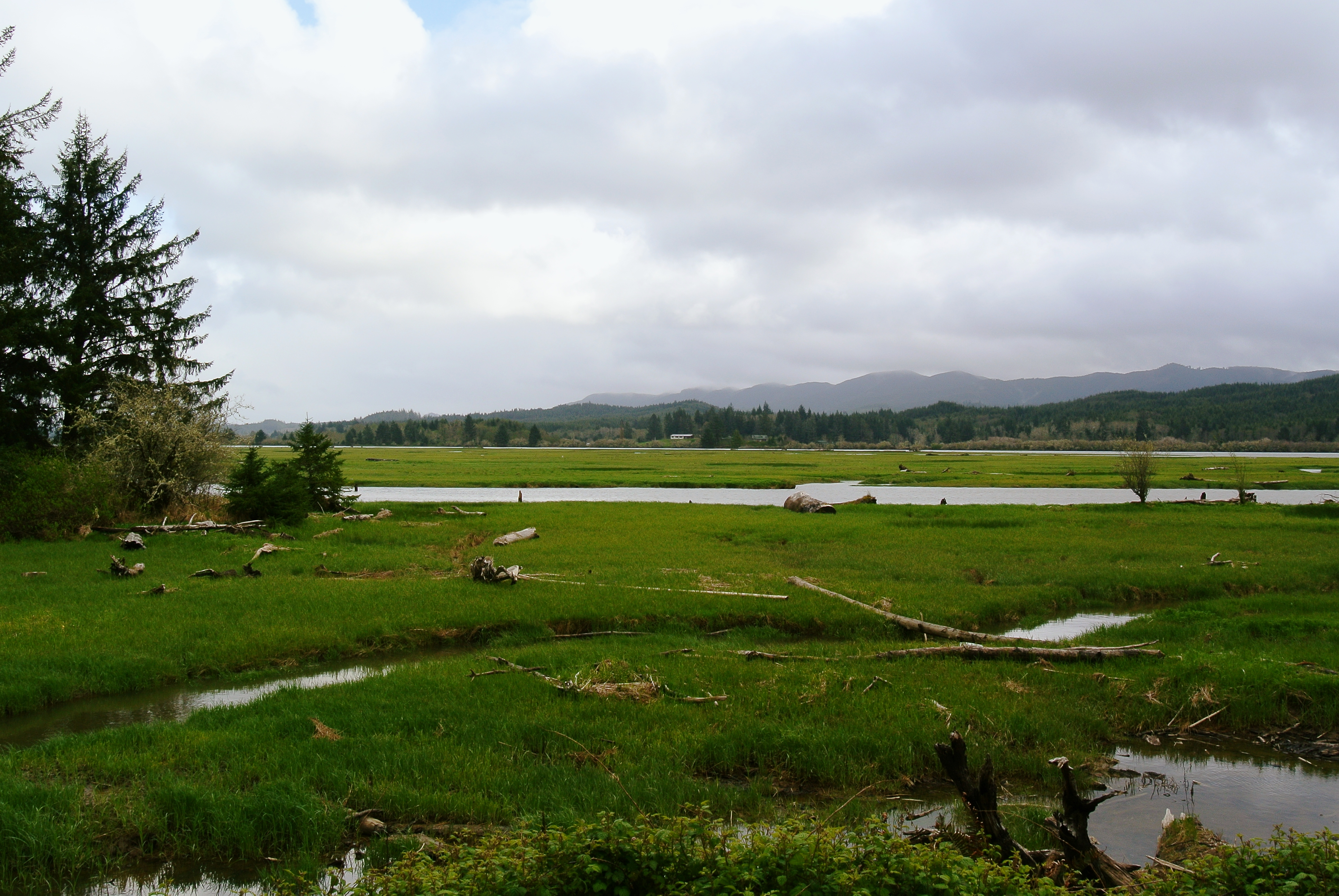
Freshwater marsh, Naselle River, Washington

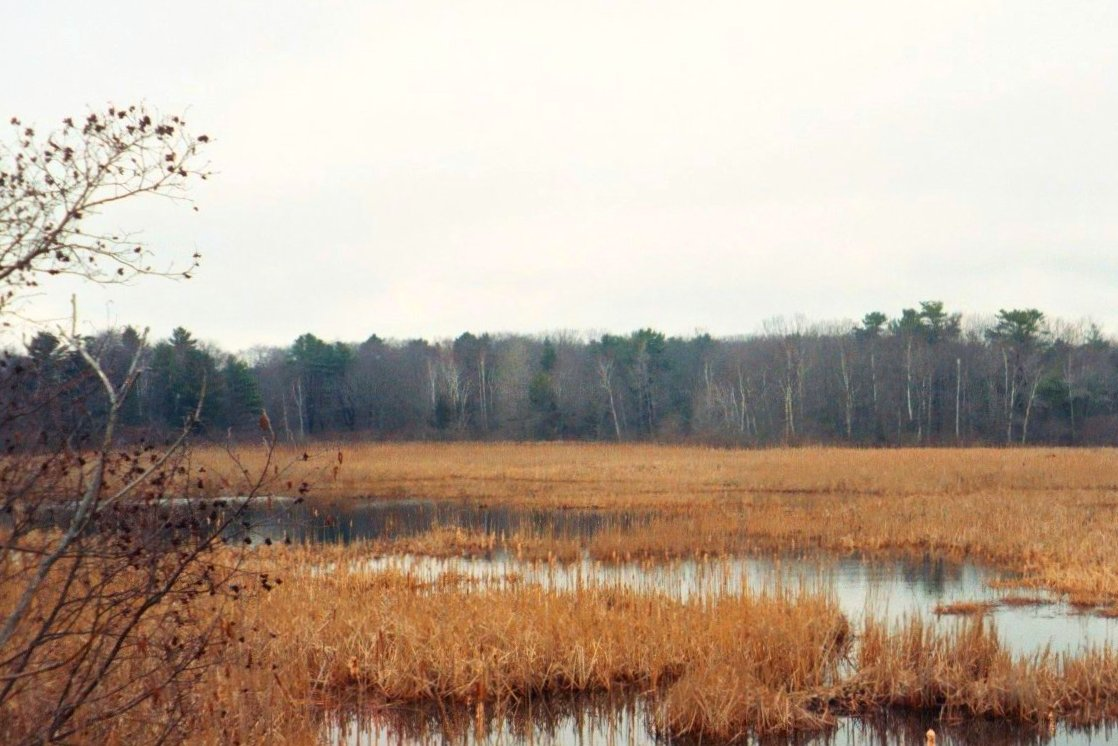
Freshwater marsh in Kittery Point, Maine

A freshwater marsh is a non-forested marsh wetland that contains shallow fresh water, and is continuously or frequently flooded. Freshwater marshes primarily consist of sedges, grasses, and emergent plants. Freshwater marshes are usually found near the mouths of rivers, along lakes, or are present in low-lying areas with low drainage like abandoned oxbow lakes. Unlike its counterpart the salt marsh, which is regularly flushed with sea water, freshwater marshes receive the majority of their water from surface water.

== Vegetation ==
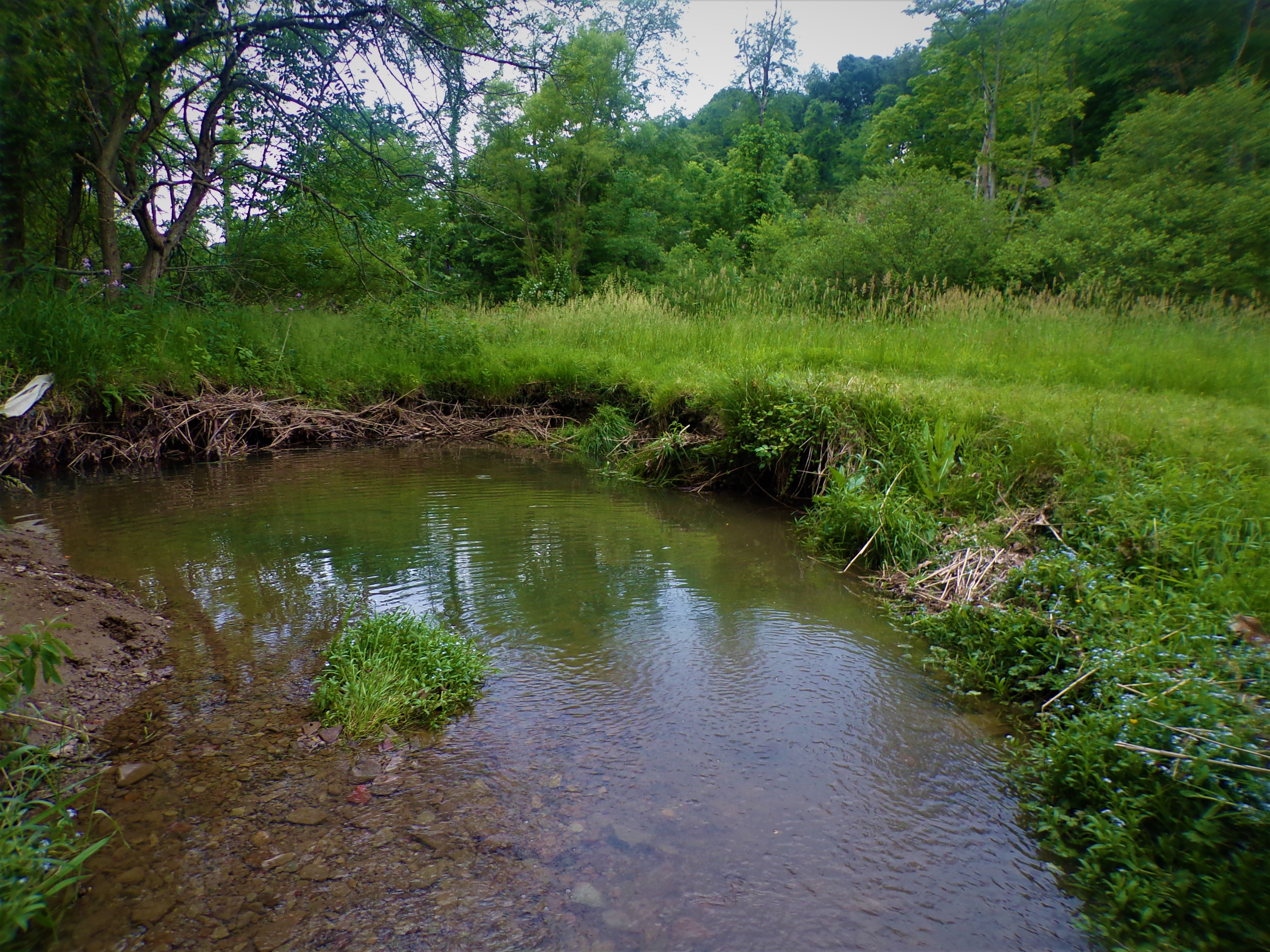
Creek in Pennsylvania which feeds the water in a surrounding freshwater marsh.

Freshwater marshes are highly productive and therefore can support a large biodiversity of vegetation. Vegetation is a key component in determining the structure of a freshwater marsh. In a freshwater marsh, there are emergent plants, floating plants, floating leaved and submerged. The primary plant in freshwater marshes are emergent plants. Emergent plants are plants with soft stems and are highly adapted to live in saturated soils. Freshwater marshes have a lengthy growing season and contain high nutrient levels in the water and substrate, which contribute to an overall high net primary production. Some of the most common plants in these areas are cattails, water lilies, arrowheads, and rushes.

== Animals ==
Many types of animals use freshwater marshes for habitat at some point in their life cycles. Birds, amphibians, reptiles, fish and macro-invertebrates can be found within freshwater marshes. Birds use freshwater marshes for nesting. Common species of birds found in a freshwater marsh include ducks, geese, swans, songbirds, swallows, coots, and black ducks. Although shallow marshes do not tend to support many fish, they are used as a nursery to raise young. The deeper ones are home to many species, including large fish such as the northern pike and carp.

== Soil ==
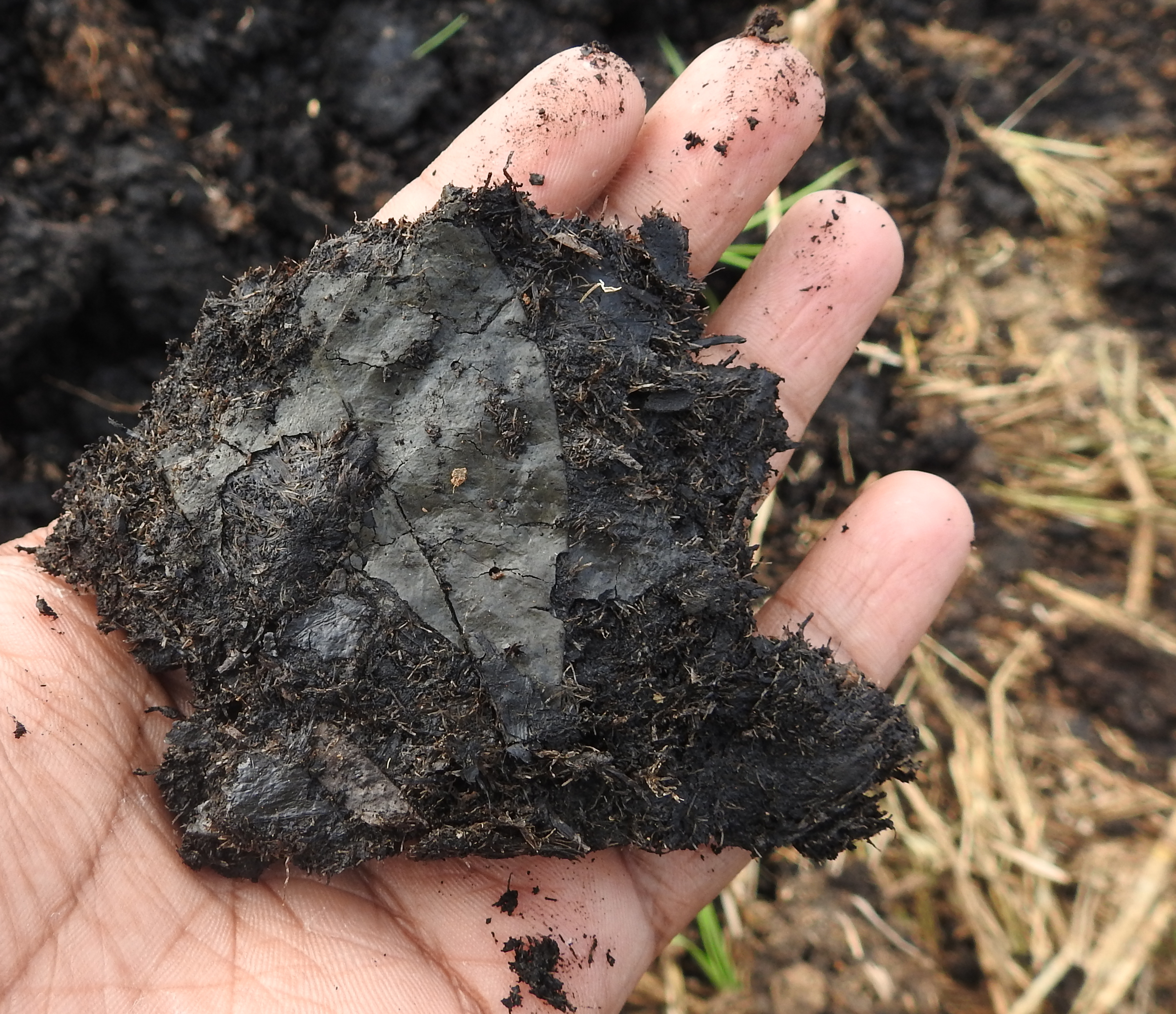
Organic rich peat-like deposit of Kole Wetlands

Soils in freshwater marshes are considered hydric; soils that are saturated during the growing season and have anaerobic, or no oxygen, conditions due to the saturation. The soils in freshwater marshes have high organic matter due to slow decomposition rates and are often black or brown. The anaerobic conditions of the soils are caused by microbial activity that deplete oxygen, which are then reverted to anaerobic processes that accumulate or deplete reduced iron and other minerals creating distinct soil morphology characteristics.

== Hydrology ==
Freshwater marshes are dynamic ecosystems. Aspects of the water like depth, velocity, oxygen concentration, and temperature change frequently. Marshes can be classified based on their hydrology. Marshes can be flooded permanently, intermittently, temporarily, seasonally, and semi-permanently. Groundwater reserves, water moving across the surface and precipitation are the three main sources of water in marshes.

== Functions and services ==
Wetlands have many services and functions that benefit the Earth. Marshes can remove carbon from the atmosphere and store it in their biomass or the ground, called carbon sequestration. Fresh water marshes hold a significant amount of the worlds organic carbon, as much as a third. In addition to carbon, other elements including carbon, nitrogen, phosphorus, sulfur, and iron, are cycled and transformed in freshwater marshes. These elements enter the system through water or from the atmosphere. Once in the wetland, they are transformed from photosynthesis, microbial processes such as nitrogen fixation and denitrification, or redoximorphic processes. Freshwater marshes also assist with particle retention. Freshwater marshes have little to no movement in water, allowing for the sediment and particulates suspended in the water from erosion and overland flow to settle out of the water accumulating in the wetland.

Freshwater marshes can also support and provide services to humans. Many different types of food are produced within a freshwater marsh like fruits, rice, fish, and vegetables such as taro. Freshwater marshes can also provide clothing in the form of pelts and materials for building such as reeds. Freshwater marshes also provide recreational services like fishing, bird-watching, water fowl hunting, and trapping. Another important function of marshes is flood mitigation. Marshes can slow down the rate at which water is traveling and create a buffer zone to stop flooding.

== Types of freshwater marshes ==
Freshwater marshes can be broken into several types including river marshes, lacustrine (lake), tidal freshwater, and palustrine depressional. Subtypes of these wetland types can be used to further specify the type of freshwater marsh based on vegetation, hydrology or location.

=== River marshes ===
River marshes are typically found within the floodplain or delta of rivers, where the wetland receives water from the river. The majority of these wetlands only receive water seasonally, when the river is highest, but there are river marshes found where the river empties into deserts with no outlet.

=== Lacustrine ===
Lacustrine marshes are found at the edges of lakes where the lakes transition from deep water to upland or other wetlands. The hydrology of lacustrine marshes are dependent on the hydrology of the surrounding area.

=== Tidal freshwater ===
Tidal freshwater marshes occur nearby tidal influences but receive most of their water from groundwater or streams. The wetlands mostly occur nearby brackish marshes where the salt water gradient decreases through those systems, therefore the freshwater tidal marshes are only affected by the tides through water levels but do not receive the salt water.

=== Palustrine depressional ===
Palustrine depressional marshes, sometimes also called basin or slope marshes, occur in hydrologically isolated areas such as a depression or on a hill slope. These marshes are not connected to rivers, lakes or oceans, but can be and frequently are fed by groundwater springs or seepages. Within the category of palustrine, there are several subcategories that are based on the location or function of the marsh. These include but are not limited to vernal pools, playas or playa lakes, and prairie potholes.

== Conservation and restoration ==
Wetlands are frequently being destroyed for development, agriculture, and other uses. Wetlands have decreased by as much as 50% since 1900 and in some parts of the world by 90%. Inland wetlands, freshwater marshes making up about 20-25% of all freshwater wetlands globally, have been decreasing approximately 1.2% each year throughout the last century (since 1900).

Wetland restoration, or bringing back the wetland and its functions, is an important step in conservation of freshwater marshes. Restoration can take two forms, re-establishment or rehabilitation. One common way freshwater marshes are restored is restoration of channelized rivers. When rivers are channelized and straightened, the marshes alongside the rivers disappear. Reverting rivers back to their natural state will allow nearby marshes to form again. Another way to restore freshwater marshes is to break down levees, dikes, and berms that impede rivers from flooding.

== Notable marshes ==
=== Florida Everglades ===
The Florida Everglades represent the largest contiguous freshwater marsh in the entire world. This immense marsh covers 4,200 square miles (11,000 km^{2}) and is located in the southern tip of Florida. The Everglades is home to animals such as the American Alligator, the Apple Snail and the Everglade Snail Kite. Alligators create depressions in the mud that retain water during the dry season. These wet depressions or alligator holes are important to fish, reptiles, and amphibians during the dry season. The vegetation of the Everglades include grasses, sedges, and other emergent hydrophytes. Continued human development, including drainage for development and polluted agriculture runoff, as well as alterations in the water cycle, threaten the existence of the Everglades.

=== Okavango Delta ===
The Okavango Delta in Botswana is one of Africa's largest freshwater marshes. Before the flowing water reaches the Okavango Delta, it comes from Angola and passes through Namibia. This marsh is so large that it can support commercial and recreational fishing. There are many tree islands within the Okavango marsh due to termites. Termites colonies build mounds in the dry season that later become flooded. The crowns of the mounds stay above water level and can support trees and other vegetation. The tree islands become a hot spot for biodiversity within the marsh. Continuous proposals for rerouting the river that fills the marsh is the main cause of concern for the future of this wetland.

=== Rift Valley ===
In Eastern Africa, the Rift Valley contains marshlands. Lake Naivasha is surrounded by tropical, freshwater marshes in the extensive 6,500 kilometer rift valley. These marshes are home to cattail, papyrus, and floating mats of other plants. This marsh is also home to ducks, herons, and crayfish. The rifting in the valley is enlarging the lake, creating more wetlands in the surrounding area.

=== Mesopotamian Marshes ===
The Mesopotamian Marshes are located in southern Iraq and Iran. The confluence of the Tigris and Euphrates Rivers create the Mesopotamian Marshes. The Mesopotamian Marshes were once the largest wetland ecosystem in the Middle East, covering an area of 15,000 to 20,000 square kilometers. In the 1980s and 1990s, this marshland was drained by upstream dams and water control structures, down to 10% of the original area. The marshland is located on the intercontinental flyway of migratory birds and is used by two-thirds of West Asia's water fowl. The marsh is currently dominated by an invasive grass, Phragmites australis.

== See also ==
- Brackish marsh
- Salt marsh
