= Ischigualasto Formation =

Geological formation in Argentina

- Stratigraphic range: Late Carnian - Early Norian; 231.7–225 Ma
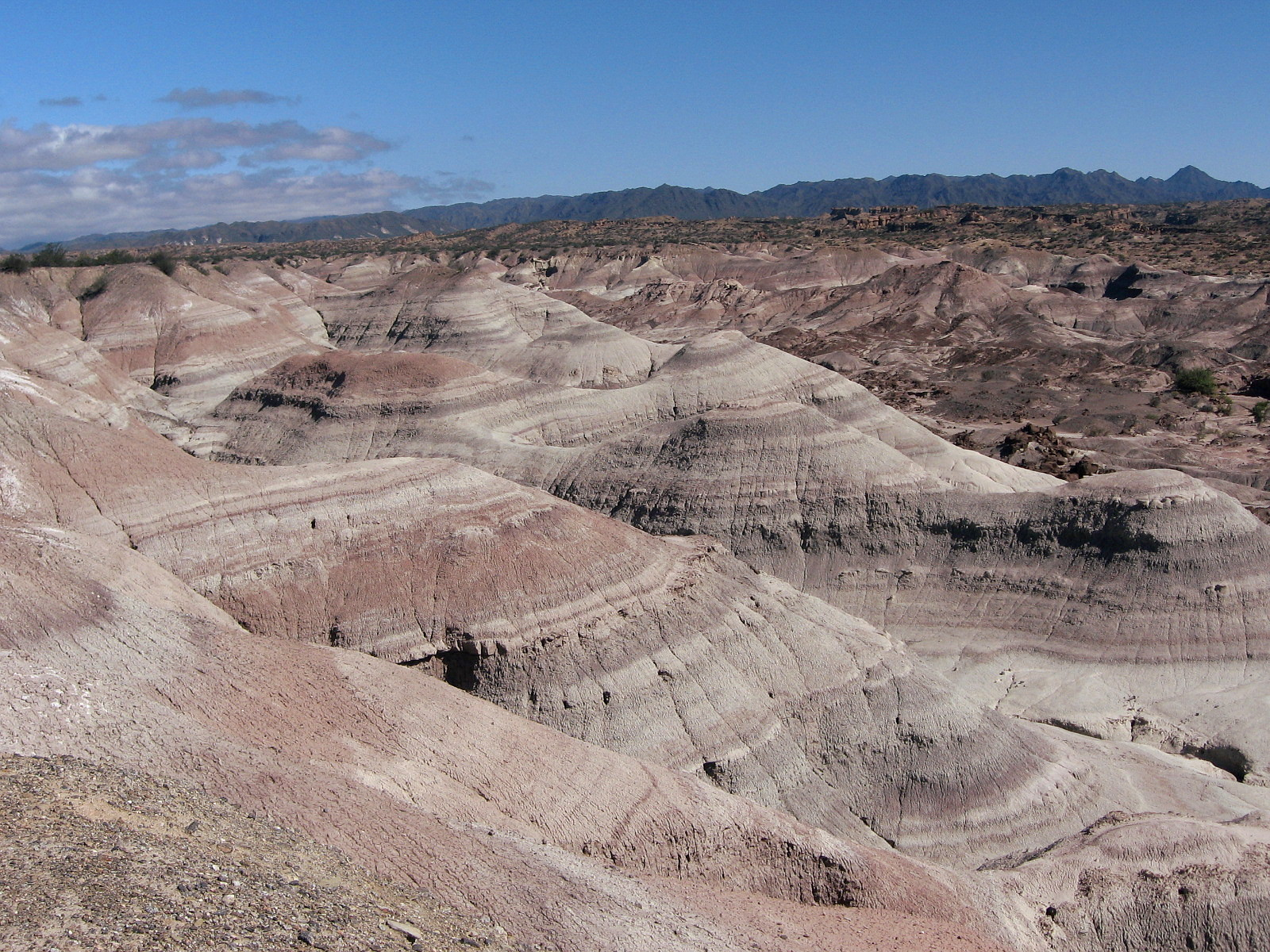
- Valle Pintado, Ischigualasto Formation
- Type: Geological formation
- Unit of: Agua de la Peña Group
- Sub-units: Quebrada de la Sal, Valle de la Luna, Cancha de Bochas & La Peña Members
- Underlies: Los Colorados Formation
- Overlies: Los Rastros Formation
- Thickness: Up to 1,059 m (3,474 ft)

Lithology
- Primary: Sandstone, mudstone
- Other: Tuff, conglomerate, siltstone, basalt

Location
- Coordinates: 29.6°S 68.1°W
- Approximate paleocoordinates: 46.0°S 40.2°W
- Region: La Rioja Province & San Juan Province
- Country: Argentina
- Extent: Ischigualasto-Villa Unión Basin

Type section
- Named for: Cacán: "Place where the moon alights"
- Named by: Frenguelli (1944)
- Ischigualasto Formation (Argentina)

The Ischigualasto Formation is a Late Triassic geological formation in the Ischigualasto-Villa Unión Basin of northwestern Argentina (southwestern La Rioja Province and northeastern San Juan Province). According to radiometric dating of ash beds, the formation dates to the late Carnian and early Norian stages of the Late Triassic (around 231.7 to 225 million years ago, though the exact duration may vary between different parts of the basin). The late Carnian portion is particularly rich in fossils, including early dinosaurs.

The Ischigualasto Formation is part of the Agua de la Peña Group, overlying the Los Rastros Formation and overlain by the Los Colorados Formation. The formation is typically subdivided into four members, from old to young; La Peña, Cancha de Bochas, Valle de la Luna and Quebrada de la Sal. The sandstones, mudstones, conglomerates and tuffs of the formation were deposited in a fluvial (river-dominated) floodplain environment, characterized by cool temperatures and strongly seasonal rainfall. The formation is most well-studied in Ischigualasto Provincial Park, a protected area established in San Juan Province in 1967 and designated a UNESCO World Heritage Site in 2000. Sites in La Rioja Province, such as Cerro Las Lajas and Cerro Bola, are less investigated but potentially even more stratigraphically extensive.

The Ischigualasto Formation is an important paleontological unit, considered a konzentrat-lagerstätte due to its density of fossils. It preserves a diverse assortment of Late Triassic synapsids, temnospondyls, and reptiles, including some of the earliest unambiguous dinosaur fossils. Herbivorous rhynchosaurs and cynodonts (especially the rhynchosaur Hyperodapedon sanjuanensis and the cynodont Exaeretodon argentinus) are by far the predominant findings among the tetrapod fossils in the formation. Herrerasaurus ischigualastensis is both the most numerous dinosaur and most abundant carnivore of the formation. Another important dinosaur with primitive characteristics is Eoraptor lunensis, found in Ischigualasto in the early 1990s. Coprolites, burrows, petrified wood, and plant compressions have also been found in the formation.

== Etymology ==
The name Ischigualasto is derived from the extinct Cacán language, spoken by an indigenous group referred to as the Diaguita by the Spanish conquistadors and means "place where the moon alights". The genus Ischigualastia and the species Herrerasaurus ischigualastensis, Pseudochampsa ischigualastensis, Pelorocephalus ischigualastensis and Protojuniperoxylon ischigualastianus were named after the formation.

== Geology ==
=== Regional setting ===
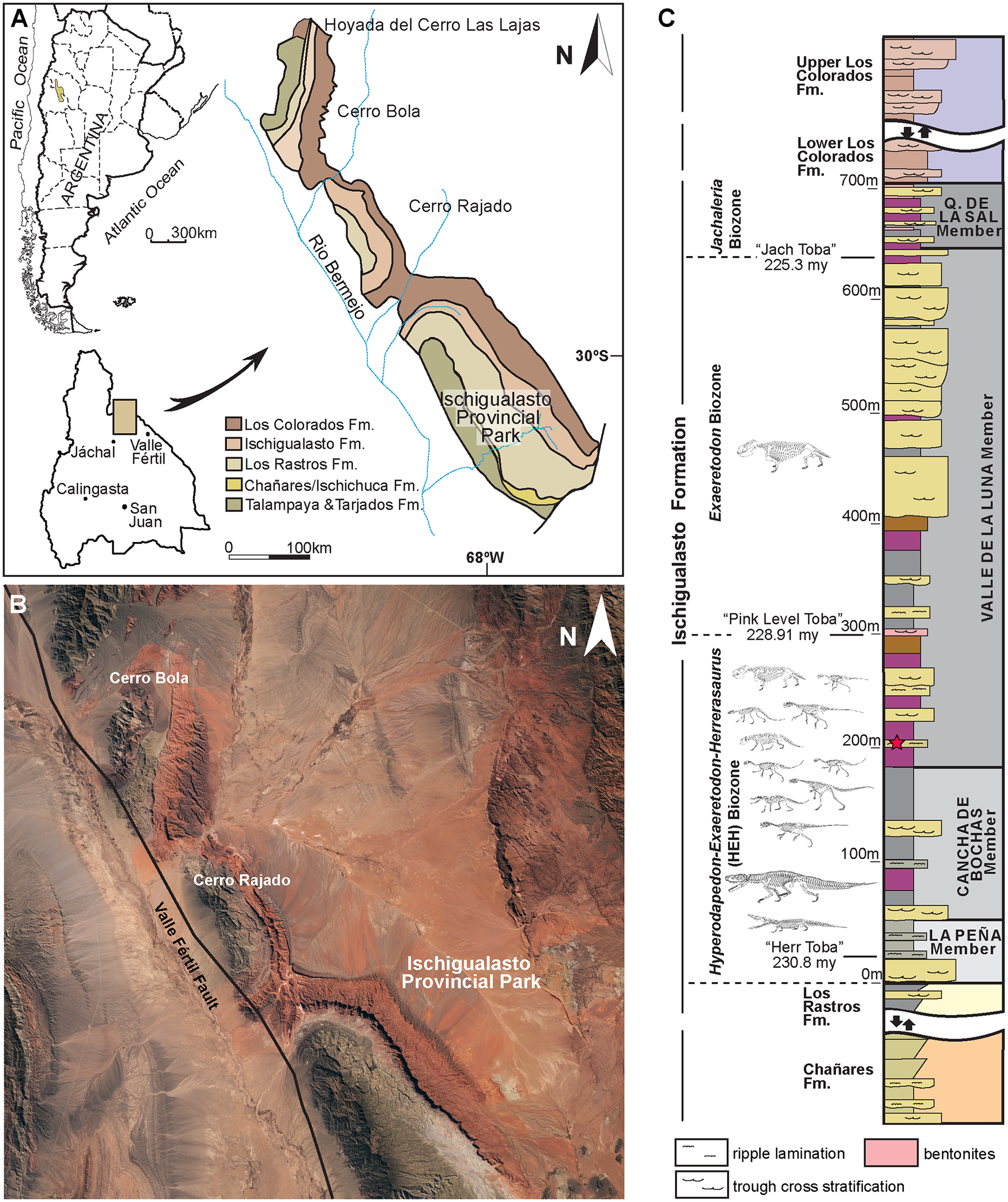
Map and stratigraphic column showing the extent of the Ischigualasto Formation and its biozones

The Ischigualasto Formation is found in the Ischigualasto-Villa Unión Basin, along the border between La Rioja and San Juan Provinces, in the badlands of Western Argentina. The formation is most widely exposed and studied in Ischigualasto Provincial Park (IPP), an Argentine national park and UNESCO World Heritage Site which occupies a large portion of the basin in San Juan province. In the western part of the park, the maximum thickness of the formation amounts to 691 metres (2,267 ft), narrowing to 397 metres (1,302 ft) in the eastern area. Conversely, the formation is thin and mostly covered by recent sediments in Talampaya National Park, which neighbors Ischigualasto Provincial Park in La Rioja to the north. Not every exposure in La Rioja is so limited, however. The previously neglected Cerro Las Lajas area, at the northwest tip of the basin, preserves an outcrop up to 1,059 metres (3,474 feet) thick in a small geographic area. Another well-exposed outcrop in La Rioja is Cerro Bola, which preserves nearly 800 metres (2,600 feet) of sediment.

The Ischigualasto-Villa Unión Basin is the remnant of an ancient half-graben which preserves a 3.5-kilometre (11,000 ft)-thick series of Triassic sediments. The Ischigualasto Formation represents the second syn-rift period within the basin, meaning that its sediments were emplaced during a brief interval when rifting was reactivated to widen the basin further. The rifting was accommodated by movement on Valle Fértil, a dormant fault along the western edge of the basin.

Stratigraphically, the formation is part of the Agua de la Peña Group, a name encompassing Late Triassic formations within the Ischigualasto-Villa Unión Basin. The Ischigualasto Formation overlies the Los Rastros Formation, a mid-Carnian unit dominated by green mudstone. It is subsequently overlain by the Los Colorados Formation, which is primarily Norian-age red sandstone. The comparatively pale color of the Ischigualasto Formation's sediments strongly contrasts with its predecessor and successor, helping to distinguish the three formations in the field.

=== Sedimentology ===
The Ischigualasto Formation was a river-dominated environment as indicated by its rock types: coarse fluvial (river channel) sandstone beds, and finer floodplain deposits of sandstones, mudstones, and paleosols. Thin bentonite tuffs are scattered through the entire formation, derived from volcanic ash.

==== Sandstone beds ====
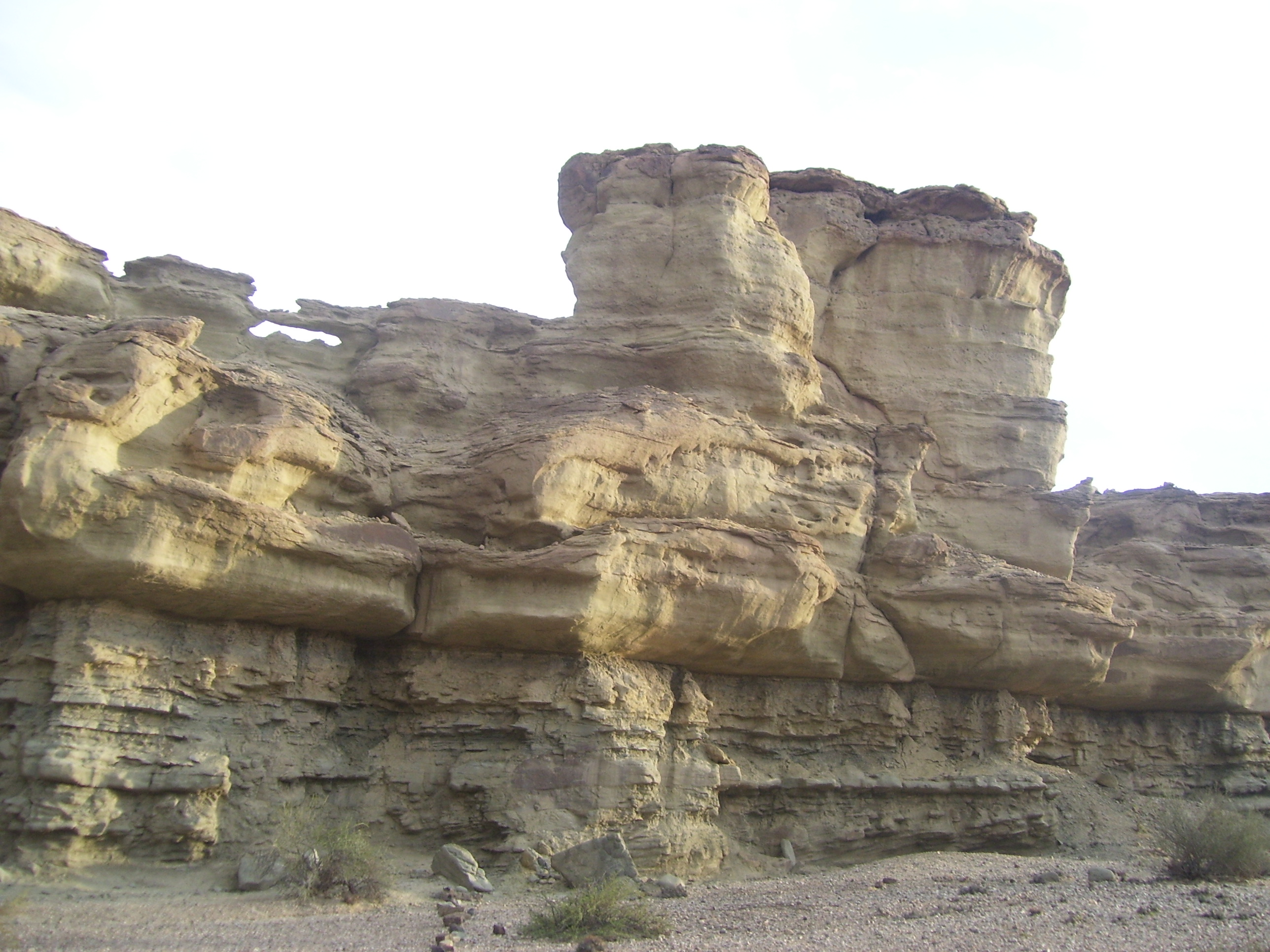
A sandstone bluff in Ischigualasto Provincial Park

The coarsest rocks in the formation are channel lag pebble-cobble river conglomerates (i.e., gravel beds, the first river sediments to sink and become buried). These form the lowermost layer of many sandstone beds, eroding into underlying fine-grained sediments. Flat, ribbon-like layers are the most common variety of river sandstone, and some layers preserve underwater ripples or dunes. Slanted sandstone layers indicate sediment accretion, either downstream or laterally (in the form of point bars). Sandstone beds occupy a range of sizes and proportions, from relatively small single-channel deposits (2 meters thick, 10 meters wide), up to massive complexes of multiple superimposed braided rivers (20 meters thick, 2000 meters wide). Sandstone and siltstone also occur in the surrounding floodplain, in the form of crevasse splays, abandoned channels, and levee deposits.

The ancient rivers and streams mainly flowed towards the north or northeast from volcanic highlands flanking the southern part of a prehistoric valley. At the southeastern edge of the modern basin, where the Ischigualasto Formation is somewhat thinner, flow indicators trend towards a northwestward orientation, possibly redirected by basalt flows. The sandstone beds also tend to be smaller and less numerous in the eastern part of the basin, while paleosols are more voluminous.

==== Mudstones and paleosols ====
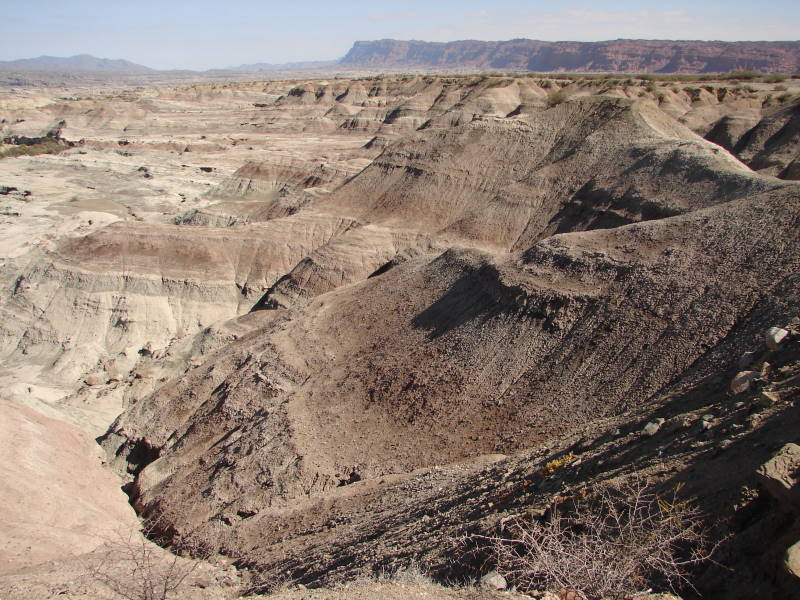
Badlands of multicolored mudstones and paleosols in Ischigualasto Provincial Park

Most floodplain sediments were fine-grained. Many of the coarser mudstone layers are overbank deposits, laid down over abandoned channels and crevasse splays. The finest sediments are preserved as paleosols (fossilized soil), of which there were eight varieties, labelled A through H. Type A paleosols are sandy soils rich in quartz and mica, with indistinct mottling, root casts, and no internal structure. They were probably protosols or entisols, young soils developing along streambanks where siliciclastic grains outnumber organic material. The other paleosols are mostly found among claystone or mudstone beds rather than sandy layers. Type B paleosols have high proportions of smectite and mica, frequent slickensides, wedge-shaped crevices (mudcracks in cross-section), and strong redoximorphic features such as gleying and mottling. They can be classified are a type of vertisol, emplaced in a warm seasonal climate with a high water table during much of the year. Type C paleosols are similar to type B, yet differ in their abundance of calcareous nodules and a paucity of redoximorphic features. Though also vertisols, they correlate with a less humid climate, moistened by periodic rainfall rather than groundwater.

Type D paleosols have high smectite and kaolinite, fine mottling, and distinctively numerous hematite nodules and clay films (argillic horizons). They are classified as argillisols or alfisols, buried in relatively dry and stable environments such as forests, away from the influence of water. Type E paleosols are simple blocky soils packed with calcareous structures and a distinct carbonate horizon alongside smectite and mica. They are calcisols, perpetually dry and stable desert soils forming in a climate with little precipitation. Type F paleosols are intermediate between type D and type E, since they have both clay- and carbonate-rich horizons and all three major clay minerals: smectite, mica, and kaolinite.

Type G and H paleosols are distinct in that they are derived from volcanic rocks, rather than sediments. Type G paleosols are colorful and sandy soils with distinct horizons rich in smectite, silica, and iron oxides. They develop above feldspar-based ash beds and are among the most laterally extensive soil type in the formation, since volcanic ash covers a broad area without regard to climate or water availability. Type H paleosols, on the other hand, are a rare variety of granular paleosol developing above basalt lavas which have been degraded and weathered during the process of soil formation.

=== Subdivisions ===
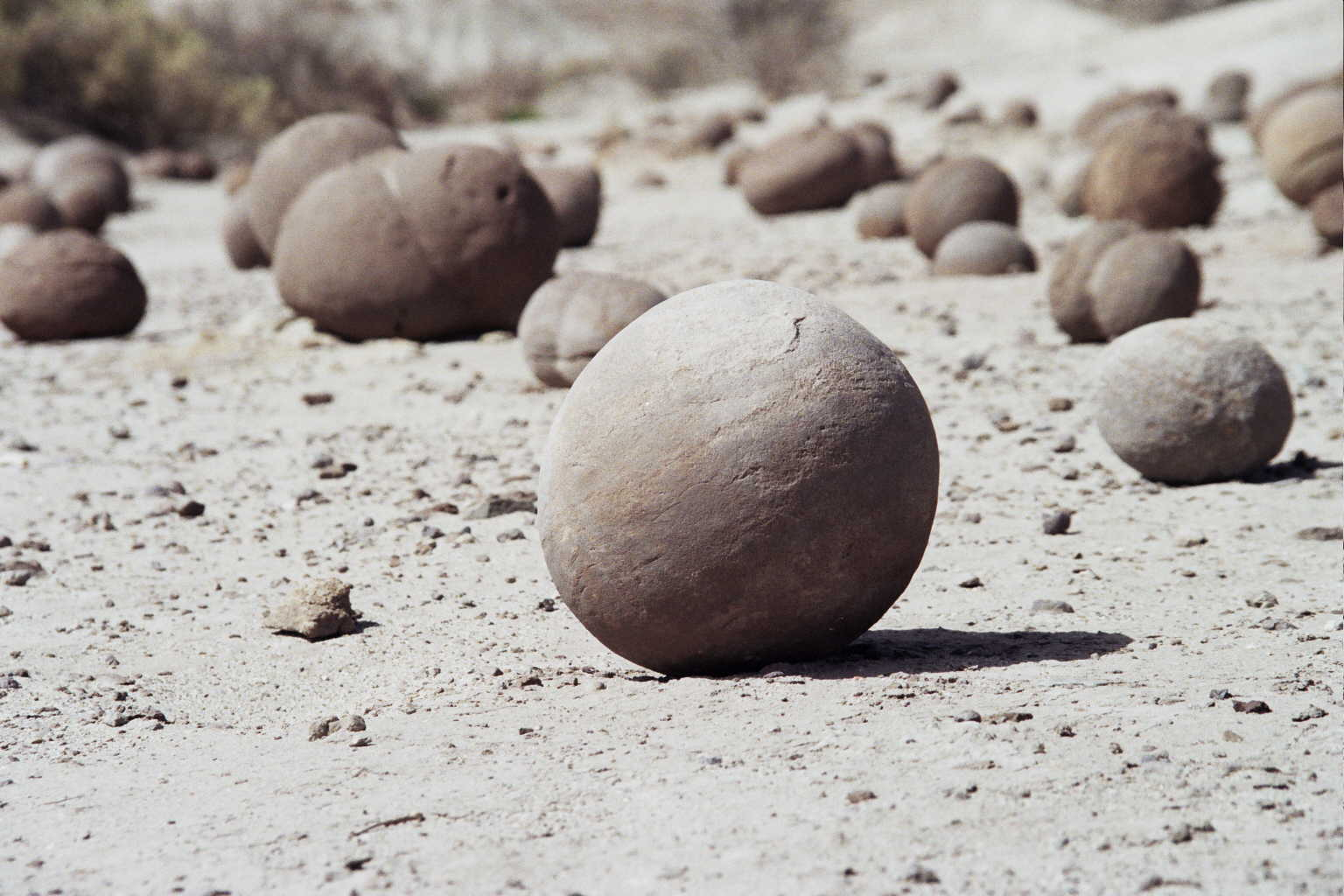
Large calcareous nodules exposed at Cancha de Bochas ("bocce court") in Ischigualasto Provincial Park. This site is the namesake of the Cancha de Bochas Member

The formation is subdivided four members in Ischigualasto Provincial Park, with each member showing a distinctive pattern of sedimentology and fossil content. These members were informally delineated in 2006 and formally named in 2009. From top (youngest and stratigraphically highest) to bottom (oldest and stratigraphically lowest), they are:

- Quebrada de la Sal Member (Unit IV): ~60 metres (200 ft). A coarse-grained member nearly lacking in fossil content. Most sediments are brown or red in color, though grey or mottled mudstones still occur sporadically, unlike the overlying Los Colorados Formation. The upper extent of the member (and the Ischigualasto Formation as a whole) is defined by the last grey mudstone bed in the Ischigualasto-Villa Unión Basin. All variety of sandstone features can be found in this member. Paleosols are limited and similar to those of the La Peña member, with type A and to a lesser extent type D as the most common varieties. Type B, F, and G paleosols are present but exceedingly rare.
- Valle de la Luna Member (UNIT III): ~450 metres (1,480 ft). The thickest member in the formation. Dark grey smectite-rich floodplain mudstone is the most common lithology, especially in the eastern part of the basin. Sandstone features are common and well-developed in the western part of the basin, as are abandoned channel overbank deposits with a high proportion of calcareous sediments. Tetrapod fossils continue to decrease in prevalence relative to earlier members, but plant fossils are locally abundant in abandoned channel deposits. The western basin has a high proportion of type A, D, and G paleosols, the central basin has more type B, and the eastern basin is mostly type A and B. Type C, E, and F paleosols are practically absent outside of the eastern basin.
- Cancha de Bochas Member (UNIT II): ~130 metres (430 ft). A fine-grained member mainly composed of mottled red/green/gray mudstone. Fossils are abundant, especially in the earliest layers of the member. Calcareous nodules are also abundant and used to distinguish this member from the La Peña and Valle de la Luna members. Slickensides, root casts, and other hallmarks of soil alteration are frequently encountered as well. Both single-channel and multi-channel sandstone beds are present, as are crevasse splay and levee deposits. Volcanic rocks include not just tuff, but also a thick basalt extrusion in the eastern part of the basin. This member hosts every type of paleosol except for type G. It is also the only member where type H paleosols are present. Type A is most common overall, type C is the most common in the middle, and types E, F, and B are most frequently found in the eastern area.
- La Peña Member (UNIT I): ~50 metres (160 ft). A coarse-grained member with uncommon but well-preserved fossils. Its base is defined by the first massive channel conglomerate layer above the Los Rastros Formation. Multi-channel fluvial sandstone is common and tannish-grey in color, though isolated single-channel and point bar deposits are seemingly absent, in contrast to the rest of the formation. Crevasse splay deposits are present but thin and silty, and floodplain mudstone is greenish-gray, sandy, and rich in smectite. Paleosols are uncommon; the western basin has type A and very rare type D paleosols while the eastern basin mostly has type B.

The outcrop at Cerro Las Lajas is instead divided into three subunits: a fossiliferous lower section (11 to 310 meters above the base of the outcrop) with meandering river deposits, a fossil-poor middle section (310 to 740 meters above base) with high-humidity paleosols, and an upper section (740 to 1070 meters above base) with braided river deposits and welded tuff beds, but no fossils.

== Age ==
=== Radiometric dating ===
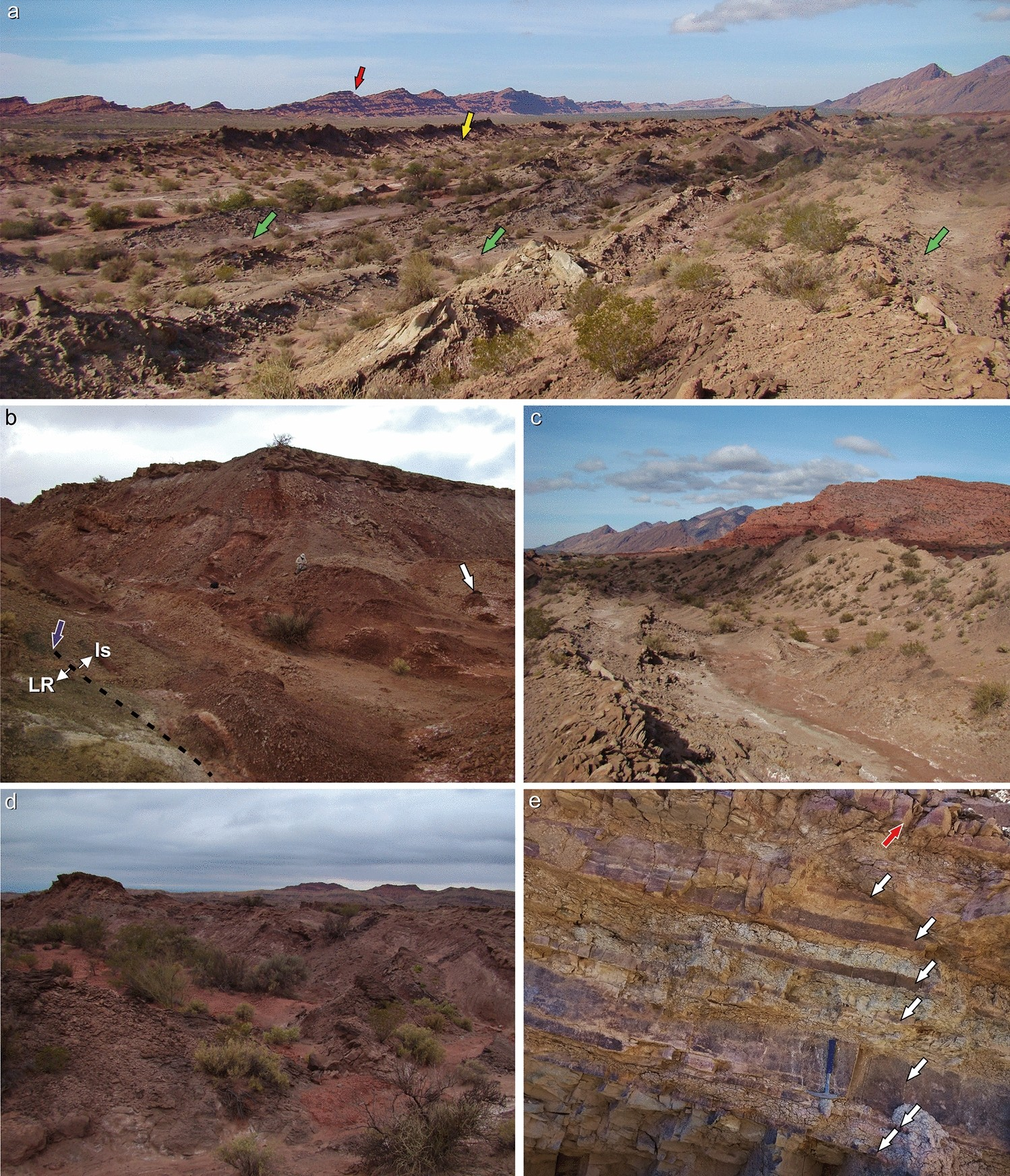
An outcrop of the Ischigualasto Formation at Cerro Las Lajas, showing major lithological and biostratigraphic boundaries (colored arrows) and tuff layers (white arrows)

Interlayered volcanic ash layers above the base and below the top of the Ischigualasto Formation in Ischigualasto Provincial Park provide precise chronostratigraphic control on the formation's duration. The two ash beds have yielded ages of 231.4 ± 0.3 Ma and 225.9 ± 0.9 Ma, respectively. These age estimates were derived from ^{40}Ar/^{39}Ar radiometric dating on sediment samples first analyzed in 1993 and recalibrated in 2011. The formation as a whole spans the Carnian-Norian boundary (at approximately 227 Ma), though the greatest diversity occurs in the older Carnian-age members of the formation (the La Peña and Cancha de Bochas members). A major faunal turnover and loss of diversity occurs in the early part of the Valle de la Luna Member, shortly before the start of the Norian. According to U-Pb dating, a 2021 study published an age of 228.91 ± 0.14 Ma for an ash bed at this level.

A 2020 study dated three tuffs at Cerro Las Lajas via U-Pb dating. The oldest tuff is at 107 meters above the base of the outcrop, shortly before the earliest fossils at the site. It has an age of 229.25 ± 0.1 Ma. The second tuff, in the middle of the fossiliferous section at 160 meters above base, is 228.97 ± 0.22 Ma. The third tuff is close to the top of the formation, 1035 meters above base with an age of 221.82 ± 0.1 Ma. These values estimate that the formation was deposited between 230.2 ± 1.9 Ma and 221.4 ± 1.2 at Cerro Las Lajas.

Small stratigraphic gaps may have been present at Cerro Las Lajas, lending some uncertainty to the thickness of the exposure and the precise level of the tuff beds. As a results, some studies suggest that only 700 meters are exposed at the site. Even accounting for this possibility, deposition of the Ischigualasto Formation at Cerro Las Lajas seems to end several million years later than at Ischigualasto Provincial Park. The age estimates at either site may be erroneous, or the transition between the Ischigualasto and Los Colorados formations is asynchronous, with some areas acquiring sediments characteristic of the latter formation at an earlier time than other areas. Likewise, sediments of the Los Rastros Formation may have been superseded later in Cerro Las Lajas relative to Ischigualasto Provincial Park.

=== Biostratigraphy ===
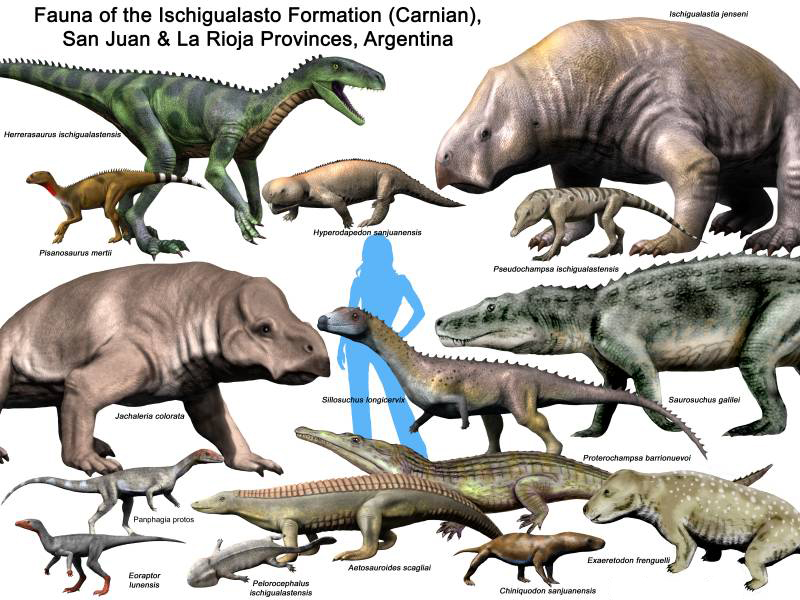
Fauna of the Ischigualasto Formation

At Ischigualasto Provincial Park, the Ischigualasto Formation is split into three biozones based on the composition and abundance of tetrapod fossils. The earliest biozone, and by far the most fossiliferous, is known as the Hyperodapedon-Exaeretodon-Herrerasaurus biozone (formerly the Scaphonyx-Exaeretodon-Herrerasaurus biozone, using an older synonym for Hyperodapedon). This biozone is characterized by the abundance of the rhynchosaur Hyperodapedon, the cynodont Exaeretodon, and the carnivorous dinosaur Herrerasaurus. It lasts from the La Peña member through the Cancha de Bochas member up as far as the earliest layers of the Valle de la Luna Member.

The second biozone is the Exaeretodon biozone, which occupies most of the Valle de la Luna Member. Hyperodapedon and Herrerasaurus disappear from the fossil record in the park, but Exaeretodon is slightly more abundant. Diversity and fossil abundance as a whole is significantly lower than the previous biozone. Only a few reptiles continue to persist through both biozones, namely Aetosauroides, Saurosuchus, and Proterochampsa. The third and final biozone is the Jachaleria biozone in the Quebrada de la Sal Member. Fossils are extremely rare; as the name implies, the only identifiable tetrapod from this member is the dicynodont Jachaleria. This biozone continues into the Los Colorados Formation.

At Cerro Las Lajas, two alternative biozones are used. The earliest biozone is the Hyperodapedon biozone, named for the prevalence of Hyperodapedon fossils. This biozone continues until about 260 meters above the base of the outcrop (equivalent to around 228 Ma). It is followed by the Teyumbaita biozone, which lacks Hyperodapedon and instead has abundant fossils of another rhynchosaur, Teyumbaita. Teyumbaita stops occurring around 350 meters above base, and the youngest fossils in the outcrop are about 400 meters above base. The Hyperodapedon and Teyumbaita biozones are suggested to be equivalent to the entire Hyperodapedon-Exaeretodon-Herrerasaurus biozone, with Teyumbaita first appearing in layers equivalent to the early Valle de la Luna member.

=== Regional and global correlations ===
Palynomorph and tetrapod biostratigraphy agree with a late Carnian to early Norian age for the formation. In terms of geological formations outside of Argentina, the Ischigualasto Formation is most easily correlated with the Upper Santa Maria Formation of the Paraná Basin in southeastern Brazil. Both formations show a pattern of abundant Hyperodapedon occurrences, followed by a decline in the genus along with a surge of Exaeretodon fossils. Proterochampsa, Aetosauroides, and herrerasaurids are also prevalent in both formations. Langer (2005) reestablished the term "Ischigualastian" for this shared faunal zone in South America, based on Bonaparte (1966)'s characterization of the Ischigualasto Formation as an interval with unique fossils. The Ischigualastian is defined by the presence of Hyperodapedon and Exaeretodon, after the dominance of the dicynodont Dinodontosaurus and prior to the first fossils of Jachaleria. Radiometric dating further supports this proposal, as the Upper Santa Maria Formation was also deposited during the late Carnian.

Outside of South America, faunal correlations are more tenuous. The Land Vertebrate Faunachron (LVF) system, initiated by Lucas (1998), intends to correlate Triassic formations on a global scale via tetrapod biostratigraphy. Lucas placed the Ischigualasto Formation within the Adamanian LVF, an biozone defined primarily by species and assemblages in southwest North America. His correlation was justified by the reported presence of several taxa shared between both continents: Ischigualastia, Saurosuchus, herrerasaurids, and the aetosaur Stagonolepis. Later investigations have disputed many of these claims. A proposed Ischigualastia femur from the Santa Rosa Formation of New Mexico may instead by referrable to Eubrachiosaurus or another unnamed stahleckeriid dicynodont. "Saurosuchus" fragments from Arizona are undiagnostic to the genus level, and cannot be taken as evidence that the genus ranged up to North America. Lucas's conception of Stagonolepis is unconventionally broad, lumping together not just the original European fossils, but also Aetosauroides and the North American genus Calyptosuchus, in defiance of many other specialists.

As an Ischigualastian index taxon, Hyperodapedon has been reported from the Pebbly Arkose Formation of Zimbabwe, the Tunduru beds of Tanzania, and the Lower Maleri Formation of India. It has also been reported from more northerly formations, such as the Lossiemouth Sandstone of Scotland, the Middle Wolfville Formation of Nova Scotia, and the Popo Agie Formation of Wyoming. Stagonolepis was initially discovered in the Lossiemouth Sandstone, providing another possible avenue of correlation with the Ischigualasto Formation. Some of the Hyperodapedon species have subsequently been placed into their own genus: the Tanzanian species is also known as Supradapedon, the Nova Scotian species is Oryctorhynchus, and the Wyoming species is Beesiiwo. Fossils from the "Isalo II" beds of Madagascar are broadly comparable to the Ischigualasto Formation, and the native Madagascan rhynchosaur, Isalorhynchus, has occasionally been considered a species of Hyperodapedon.

The Ischigualasto Formation is home to one of the oldest crocodylomorphs, Trialestes. This may facilitate correlation to other formations with very early crocodylomorphs: the Pekin Formation of North Carolina and the Lower Maleri Formation in India. Faunal composition through the "Ischigualastian" interval may be more closely tied to paleolatitude rather than geographical closeness. South America's late Carnian-early Norian ecosystems roughly resemble Africa, Europe, India, and northern North America, but strongly differ from southern North America.

== Climate and paleoenvironment ==
The Ischigualasto Formation dates to only a few million years after the Carnian Pluvial Episode (CPE), an interval of particularly warm and wet global climate in the mid-Carnian. The CPE corresponds to the underlying Los Rastros Formation. Various studies have come to strongly different conclusions on the climate of the Ischigualasto Formation.

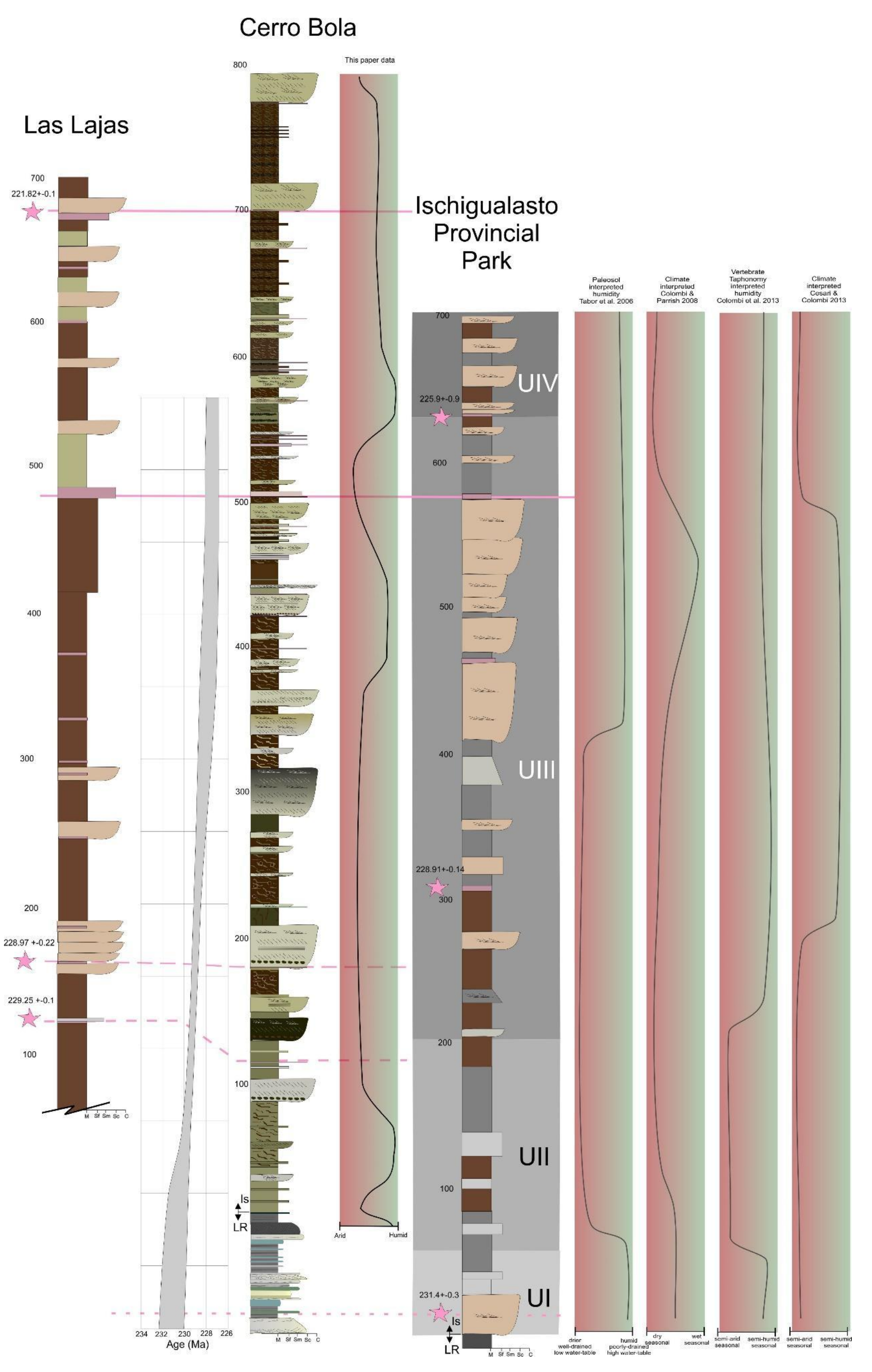
Stratigraphic columns of the Ischigualasto Formation at three major sites (Cerro Las Lajas, Cerro Bola, and Ischigualasto Provincial Park), mapped alongside radiometric dates (pink stars) and proposed climate trends from various studies

A 2004 study evaluated the geological composition of an Ischigualasto paleosol derived from a weathered basalt flow about 45 m above the base of the formation. The paleosol in question, later labelled as a type H paleosol, was a vertisol (indicating strong wet and dry seasons) preserving a horizon rich in goethite (a weathering product facilitated by cool rainwater) alongside high concentrations of kaolinite and a lack of carbonate (both indicative of high moisture). The estimated mean annual temperature was similar to Marion Island or southernmost Norway, as low as 3 to 9 °C (37 to 48 °F). Precipitation was comparable to a cool mediterranean climate, exceeding 750 to 1,000 millimeters per year (30 to 39 in/year) but with strong wet and dry seasons.

Later studies indicate strong climate fluctuations through the formation, with some members characterized by a semi-arid climate. When the same authors sampled a broader range of paleosols in 2006, their conclusions were modified. δ^{18}O values were extracted from calcareous nodules preserved in the three upper members of the formation. These values suggested mean annual temperatures below 11 °C (52 °F), only barely warmer than the previous estimate. Precipitation was more erratic through the formation's history, as indicated by variation in the frequency of low-moisture (calcareous) and high-moisture (non-calcareous) paleosols. Calcareous paleosols (types C, E, and F) are common in the Cancha de Bochas and lower Valle de la Luna members, but rare or absent in the rest of the formation. This suggests that the middle part of the formation experienced a cool semi-arid climate while the early and later parts were more humid.

A 2008 study compared the distribution of paleosols and plant fossils, with implications for climate change and the evolution of depositional environments within the Ischigualasto Formation. The La Peña Member would have been subhumid and frequently destabilized by shifting braided rivers, leaving little room for the development of dry mature soils or forests. By time of the Cancha de Bochas Member, the river systems stabilized into meandering and anastomosing forms, but the climate became much drier, so plant growth continued to be inhibited. The upper Valle de la Luna Member was by far the wettest part of the formation, with a mean annual precipitation exceeding 760 millimeters per year (30 in/year). A high water table, stable river channels, and a more humid climate allowed for the development of marsh habitats, widespread deep soils, and large trees. Dry conditions returned with the Quebrada de la Sal Member, with small sandy streams as the predominant depositional environment. These climate transitions were subtle, and the formation as a whole was assigned a climate with cool dry winters and hot rainy summers enhanced by the Pangean megamonsoon. Warm temperate grasslands in Oklahoma and central Argentina were considered the closest modern equivalent to the Ischigualasto paleoenvironment.

A 2022 study attempted to infer climate via a diverse set of geochemical proxies in paleosols. For the Ischigualasto Formation as a whole, their results estimated a mean annual temperature of 9.4 to 17.5 °C (48.9 to 63.5 °F) and a mean annual precipitation of 700 to 1,400 millimeters per year (28 to 55 in/year). This is notably cooler and drier than the Los Rastros Formation, though warmer than previous estimates. Using radiometrically dated ash beds and the 800 m outcrop of Cerro Bola as guidelines, the study proposed the following climate trends through the formation: the climate started out as relatively warm and humid, before drying out (at around 100 m or 229.5 Ma), and eventually recovering a degree of fluctuating seasonal humidity at the close of the Carnian (at 380 m or 227.8 Ma). These fluctuations are difficult to compare with changes in the fauna and flora, though rhynchosaur abundance and pseudosuchian diversity may show a positive correlation with high humidity in the formation.

== Taphonomy ==
=== Vertebrate preservation ===
Representative articulated vertebrate fossils from the Ischigualasto Formation

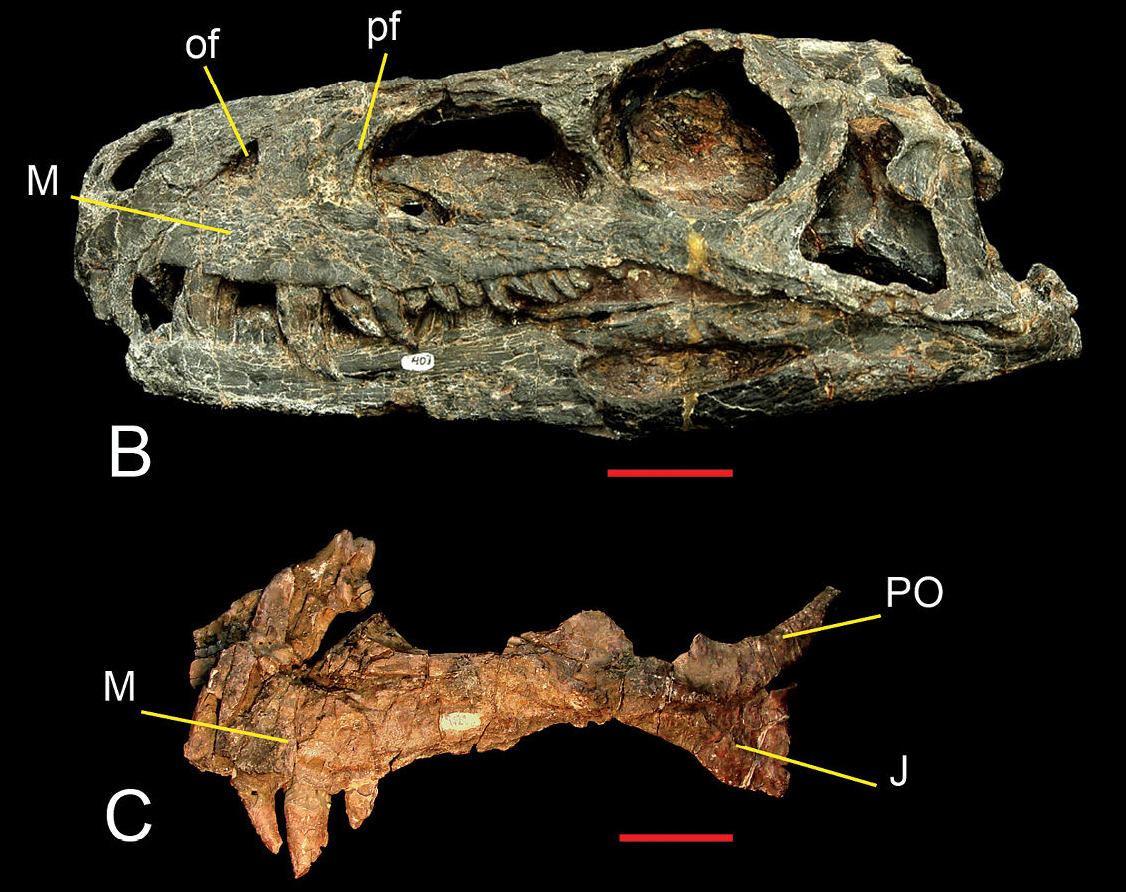
Herrerasaurus ischigualastensis (PVSJ 407, PVSJ 053)

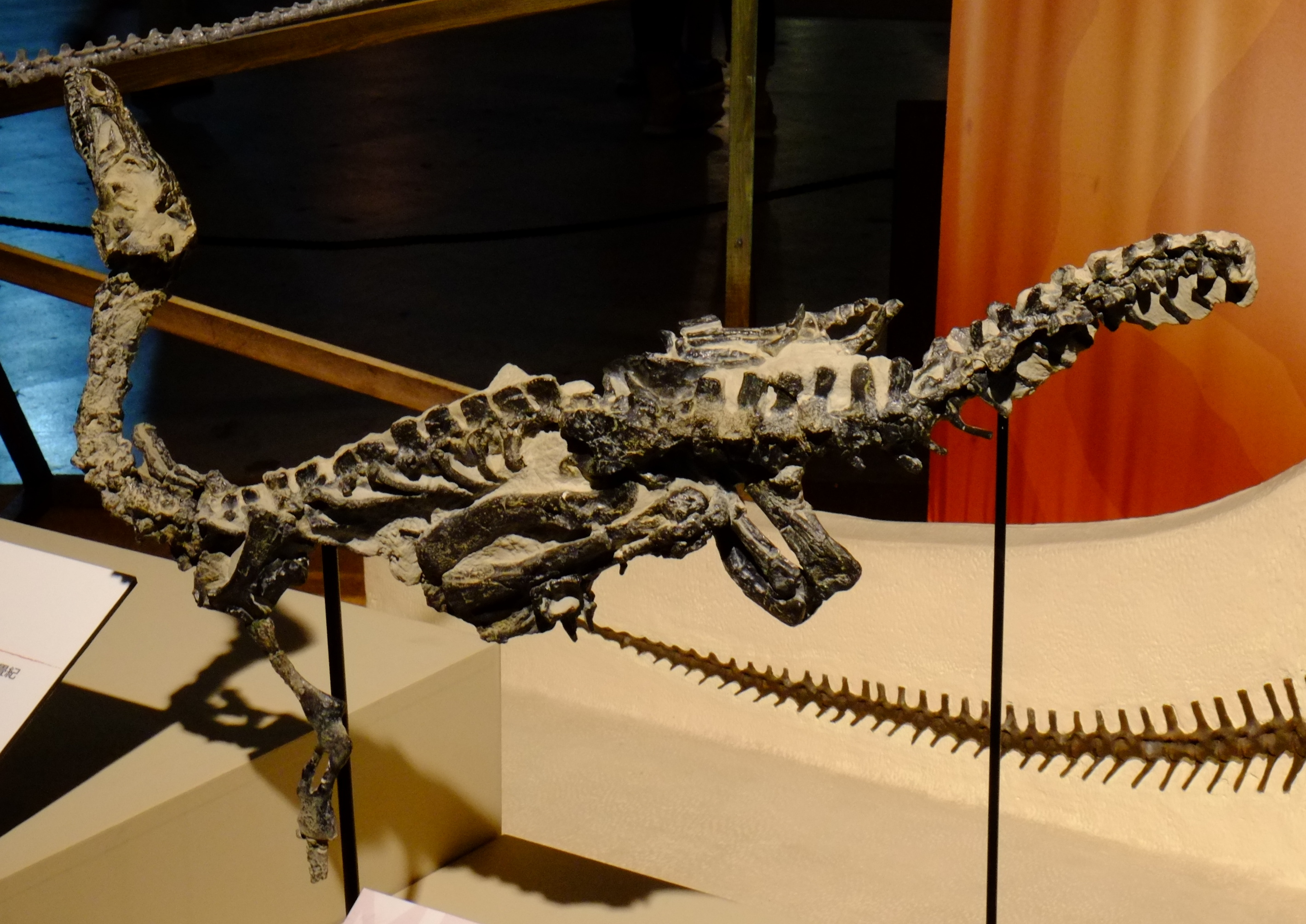
Eoraptor lunensis (PVSJ 512)

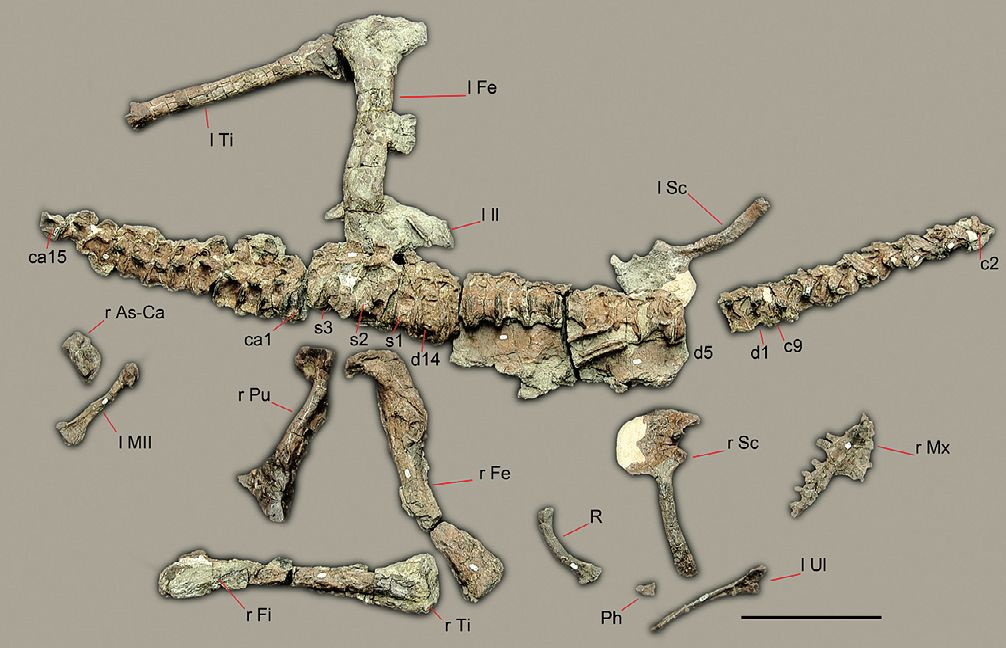
Sanjuansaurus gordilloi (PVSJ 605)

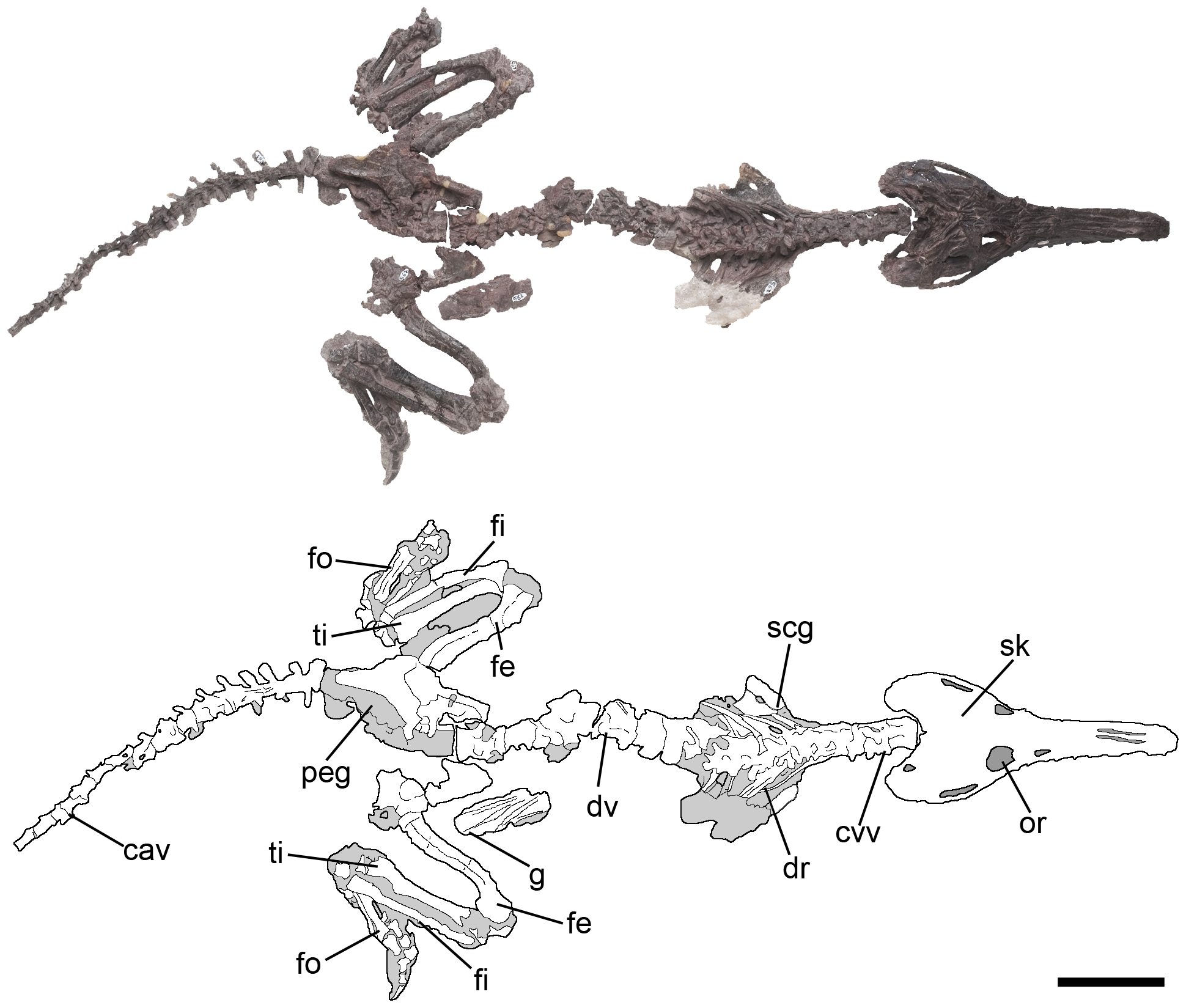
Pseudochampsa ischigualastensis (PVSJ 567)

According to a 2012 survey, vertebrate fossils in Ischigualasto Provincial Park present several distinct modes of preservation influenced by their location and stratigraphic level within the park. Fossils are rare in the center of the basin and most common along the margins, especially the southern edge. Nearly 88% of fossils are from floodplain deposits, with the remainder from active channel fills. There is little consistency in the distribution of particular animal groups relative to their place of burial, though well-preserved skulls of small cynodonts are unusually common in channel sandstone.

Around 4% of vertebrate fossils in the survey are recovered from the La Peña Member. Vertebrates from this member tend to be slightly weathered and splintered, with associated or semi-articulated bone clusters more common than fully articulated skeletons. Fossils are covered with a hematite crust, and internally recrystallized by hematite, apatite, calcite, and barite. Carcasses were buried in place by waterlogged floodplain and river sediments, though more fragmentary specimens were probably exposed for longer. Higher-quality preservation would have been facilitated by a high level of anoxic groundwater or dense vegetation to protect the bones from the elements.

Nearly 65% of vertebrate fossils are from the Cancha de Bochas Member, but preservation is overall worse than in the previous member. A larger portion of the fossils are isolated and/or highly weathered bones, though many articulated skeletons with excellent preservation have also been found. Calcite is by far the most common mineral in fossils both externally and internally, while hematite is uncommon, occurring as an internal crust layer close to the original bone. The drier climate induced a patchier distribution of carcasses, with most animals dying alone in dry areas exposed to scavengers. The few exceptional fossils may have been mummified in areas with a high density of animals, such as watering holes, where scavengers cannot keep up with the accumulation of carcasses. The proportion of fossils per sediment layer increases due to a lower sedimentation rate and a reduced influence from rivers, which otherwise would have washed the remains out of the basin. Soil chemistry shifts from anoxic to alkaline, encouraging calcite formation while discouraging hematite.

The lower Valle de la Luna Member preserves 26% of vertebrate fossils in the survey. Preservation is even worse than the Cancha de Bochas Member, as the proportion of highly weathered and isolated fossils continues to increase. Hematite regains its position as the most common mineral in fossils, and calcite is rare. Finally, 5% of vertebrate fossils are from the middle-upper Valle de la Luna Member. The same trend of decreasing fossil quality continues, with hematite and (to a lesser extent) barite as the predominant minerals. Higher subsidence and sedimentation in the middle of the basin decreased the relative density of fossil accumulation. The opposite is true for the edge of the basin, where carcasses would have been isolated and exposed to scavengers and weathering processes for prolonged periods. Preservation was jeopardized further by high humidity and groundwater acidity. Vertebrate fossils practically never occur in abandoned channel and marsh deposits, despite the frequency of plant fossils in these environments. The few fossil fragments from the Quebrada de la Sal Member are strongly weathered and covered by a very thick hematite crust.

=== Plant preservation ===
Plant fossils from the Ischigualasto Formation

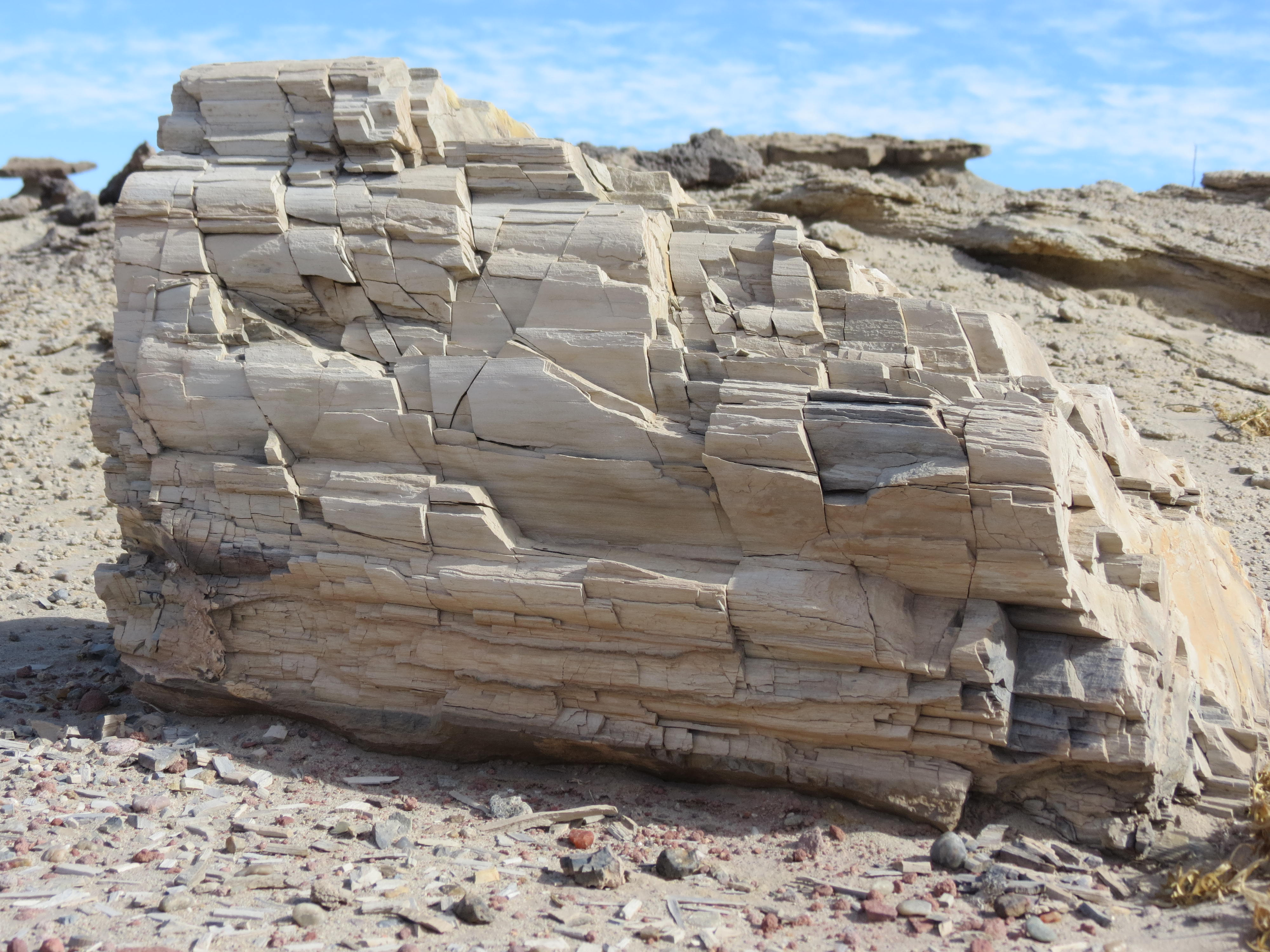
Fossilized wood

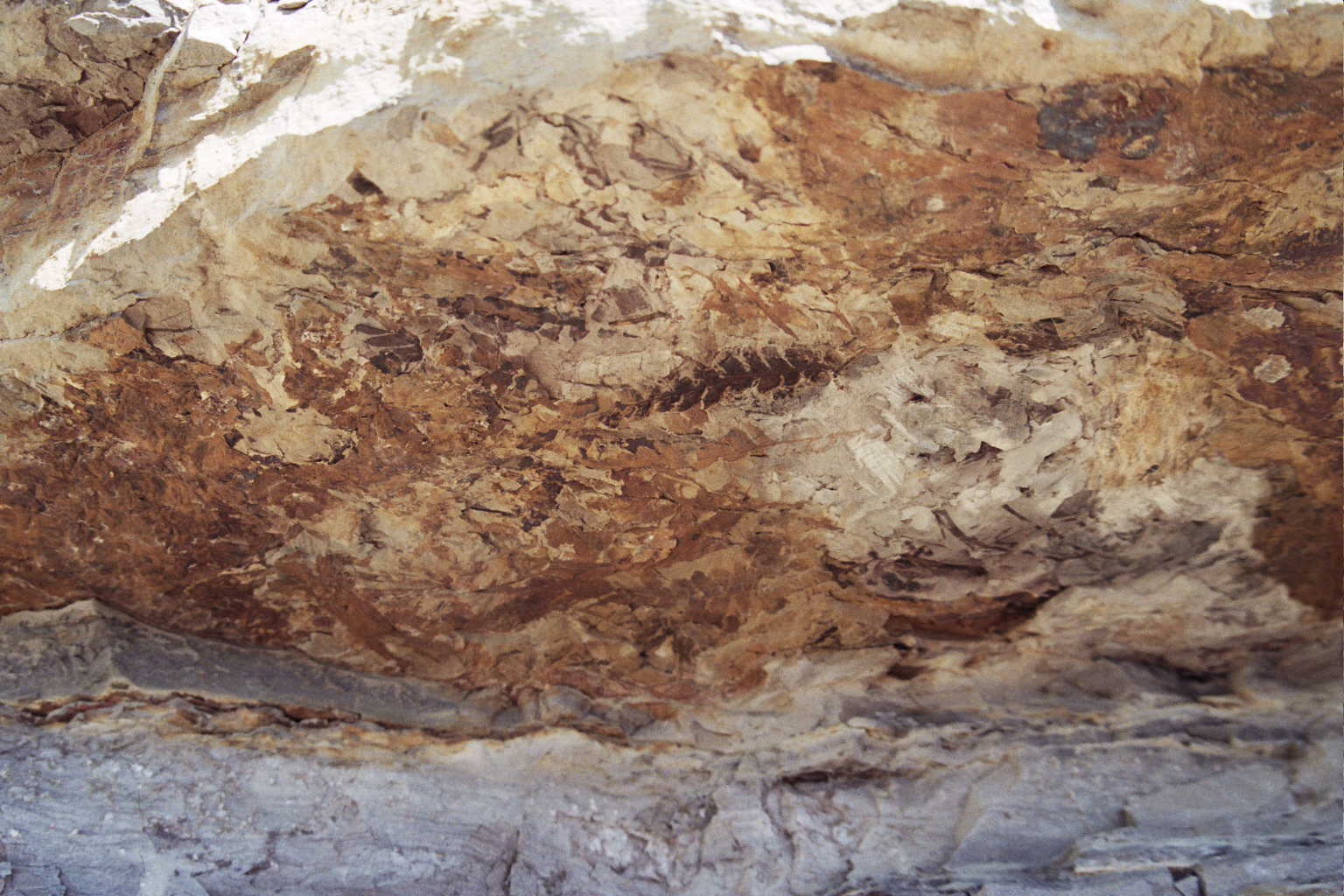
Foliage impressions

Plant preservation in the Ischigualasto Formation can follow nine different taphonomic pathways, each associated with a particular depositional environment:

- (A) Fibrous clay-filled root traces occupy smaller and more fine-grained sandstone beds, which were only exposed long enough for herbaceous plants to take hold. This type of preservation is common, especially in the La Peña Member and the middle part of the basin.
- (B) Root halos, ring-shaped discolorations indicative of altered soil chemistry around root traces. They are found in red paleosols affected by microbial activity in upland environments. They occur from the Cancha de Bochas member upwards, with the thickest root halos in the Valle de la Luna Member.
- (C) Silicified roots and stumps of woody shrubs are only found in thick braided channel sandstone deposits. The plants responsible for the silicified fossils would have inhabited dry sandbars and abandoned channels, only to be inundated and buried by new sediment and volcanic ash washed down by seasonal floods. This type of preservation is known from every member, but it is rare.
- (D) Silicified roots and trunks of large woody trees, often standing perpendicular to the bedding plane. The trunks occupy abandoned channel deposits in the mid-upper Valle de la Luna Member, with the wood stabilized in position by interbedded layers of mudstone and sandstone. Rhexoxylon piatnitzkyi is the most common species of petrified wood in the formation.
- (E) Horizontal silicified tree trunks and branches, parallel to the bedding plane. These trunks are found in exceptionally large sandstone beds in the mid-upper Valle de la Luna Member. They were probably riparian trees which were toppled, stripped of their roots, and buried during massive floods.
- (F) Horizontal foliage impressions and cuticle, parallel to the bedding plane. These plant fossils are the most diverse and diagnostic in the formation, deposited in thin flattened layers of fine-grained sediment. The original environment was calm stagnant water, probably a shallow marsh occupying an abandoned channel near an active river. Only found in the mid-upper Valle de la Luna Member.
- (G) Cuticle oriented oblique to the bedding plane, similar to the horizontal impressions but significantly more fragmentary. These are only found in trough cross-bedded sandstone, representing freshly detached foliage slowly settling onto a streambed by waning flood waters. Only found in the mid-upper Valle de la Luna Member.
- (H) Palynomorphs (pollen, spores, and other microscopic plant fossils). Found in marsh mudstone alongside horizontal foliage impressions and cuticle.
- (I) Eroded charcoal fragments, found alongside horizontal silicified trunks (in major flood deposits) or oblique cuticle (in trough cross-bedded sandstone beds).

Some fossilized wood in the formation display particular styles of decay and degradation, helping to estimate the occurrence of various bacteria and fungi groups in the Triassic Period which otherwise lack fossil evidence. For example, branches of Rhexoxylon piatnitzkyi were tunneled by wood-boring beetles (surprisingly similar to modern cerambycids) and decayed by white rot fungi. These attacks were defended against while the tree was still living, as shown by an abundance of resin cells and rings of thickened tracheids. This is the first report of wood boring and associated defense mechanisms in corystosperms. A similar relationship is found between modern conifers and their pests, and the situation in Rhexoxylon shows that the relationship originated at least as far back as the Triassic.

== Paleobiota ==
Color key: Taxon / Reclassified taxon / Taxon falsely reported as present / Dubious taxon or junior synonym / Ichnotaxon / Ootaxon / Morphotaxon

Notes
Uncertain or tentative taxa are in small text
~~crossed out~~ taxa are discredited.

=== Trace fossils ===
Coprolites were found in Valle Pintado in the upper part of the formation. Analysis of the coprolites revealed that plant remains were absent and bone material and apatite were sparse. The most likely candidate to have produced these fossil feces has been suggest as the most common reptile in the formation, Herrerasaurus.

Two different morphotypes of animal burrows are found in levee and crevasse splay deposits in the Cancha de Bochas member. One type of burrow is a horizontal mesh of tunnels and enlarged chambers which occasionally meet with vertical shafts branching off at right angles. Though the tunnel system extends up to 2 cubic meters, the tunnel diameters do not exceed 15 cm, while chambers only reach 25 cm in width. They were almost certainly created by small terrestrial vertebrates, presumably cynodonts. The other tunnel morphotype is a calcareous web of narrow, elliptical burrows (average diameters of 7 cm) branching out from a long vertical shaft. It probably represents plant root casts enlarged further by small animals. Clustered skeletons of juvenile Hyperodapedon have been found in sediments similar to those expected from a collapsed burrow, supporting the idea that rhynchosaurs were also among the burrowing fauna of the formation.

=== Reptiles ===
==== Dinosaurs ====
A 1993 study found dinosaur specimens to comprise only 6% of the total tetrapod sample. A 2011 study estimated a much higher proportion (11% of all findings), though a 2025 study returned to a lower estimate (5.2%). Even at lower estimates, dinosaurs still take up 76% of fossil abundance and 44% of species richness if one only considers animals smaller than 30 kg. Rarefaction curves (which plot known diversity against sample size through time) suggest that there are still many more species to be discovered in the Ischigualasto Formation. Carnivorous dinosaurs are the most common terrestrial carnivores of the Ischigualasto Formation, with herrerasaurids comprising 72% of all recovered terrestrial carnivores. The fossils of an undescribed species of theropod are present in San Juan Province.

Dinosaurs of the Ischigualasto Formation
Genus	Species	Province	Member	Biozone	Material	Notes	Image
Anteavis	A. crurilongus	San Juan	Cancha de Bochas	Hyperodapedon-Exaeretodon-Herrerasaurus biozone	Specimen PVSJ 1085 (a partial skeleton)	A small non-neotheropod theropod with anatomical features previously thought to be exclusive to neotheropods.	
Chromogisaurus	C. novasi	San Juan	lower Cancha de Bochas	Hyperodapedon-Exaeretodon-Herrerasaurus biozone	A partial skeleton.	A basal sauropodomorph closely related to Saturnalia, a saturnaliid (or saturnaliine guaibasaurid) from Brazil. Estimated length is around 2 metres (6.6 ft).	
Eodromaeus	E. murphi	San Juan	La Peña, Cancha de Bochas, Valle de la Luna	Hyperodapedon-Exaeretodon-Herrerasaurus biozone	A nearly complete skeleton and at least five other fossils.	A small and well-preserved predatory dinosaur, often considered the oldest known theropod since its description in 2011. It was a lightweight and long-limbed carnivore, around 1.2 meters (3.9 feet) in length, with an estimated weight of about 5 kilograms (11 pounds).	
Eoraptor	E. lunensis	San Juan	Cancha de Bochas	Hyperodapedon-Exaeretodon-Herrerasaurus biozone	A nearly complete skeleton and at least seven other fossils, though only some of these are referred to the species with certainty.	One of the most well-preserved and well-described Carnian-age dinosaurs. It was a small generalist with bipedal habits and a presumably omnivorous diet, according to the structure of its teeth. In its initial 1993 description, it was hailed as an early theropod vital for approximating the common ancestor of all dinosaurs. Many studies have subsequently reclassified it as a basal sauropodomorph. 1 meter (3.3 feet) in length, with an estimated weight of about 10 kilograms (22 pounds).	
Herrerasaurus	H. ischigualastensis	San Juan	Cancha de Bochas	Hyperodapedon-Exaeretodon-Herrerasaurus biozone	"Various partial skeletons, including a complete skull and mandible." Over 50 specimens have been recorded.	A herrerasaurid, among the largest and most well-described predatory dinosaurs of the Triassic, as well as the most common carnivore in the Ischigualasto Formation. The largest known specimen, previously referred to the discredited genus Frenguellisaurus, had a skull measuring 56 cm (22 in) in length and a total body length estimated at 6 meters (20 ft). Though Herrerasaurus was the earliest dinosaur collected from the formation in the 1960s, the most complete specimen, a juvenile, was only described in 1992.	
Panphagia	P. protos	San Juan	lower Cancha de Bochas	Hyperodapedon-Exaeretodon-Herrerasaurus biozone	A disarticulated partial skeleton.	A small basal sauropodomorph, initially considered to be the oldest and basal-most member of the group when described in 2009. Sometimes classified as a guaibasaurid or saturnaliid within Sauropodomopha. Estimated length is around 1.30 meters (4.3 feet).	
Sanjuansaurus	S. gordilloi	San Juan	upper La Peña or lowermost Cancha de Bochas	Hyperodapedon-Exaeretodon-Herrerasaurus biozone	A mostly-articulated partial skeleton.	A herrerasaurid comparable in size to a medium-sized Herrerasaurus.	
An unnamed herrerasaurid	Unnamed				Specimen MACN-PV 18649a, a partial forelimb.	An undescribed species of herrerasaurid mentioned in conference abstracts in the late 2000s.	

==== Other archosaurs ====
Non-dinosaur archosaurs of the Ischigualasto Formation
Genus	Species	Province	Member	Biozone	Material	Notes	Images
Aetosauroides	A. scagliai	San Juan, La Rioja	Cancha de Bochas, lower Valle de la Luna	Hyperodapedon-Exaeretodon-Herrerasaurus biozone, Hyperodapedon biozone, Exaeretodon biozone	Armor, postcrania, and skull material from at least 20 specimens, though not all of these may belong to the genus.	A large and fairly common basal aetosaur, one of the few known from South America. Presumably carnivorous, unlike most members of the group. Once proposed to be synonymous with Stagonolepis.	
Indeterminate aetosaurs	Indeterminate	San Juan	Cancha de Bochas	Hyperodapedon-Exaeretodon-Herrerasaurus biozone	Armor and postcrania of indeterminate basal aetosaurs, including an articulated partial skeleton.	Many indeterminate aetosaur fossils from the formation, such as the nomen dubium Argentinosuchus bonapartei, cannot be unambiguously referred to Aetosauroides.	
Ignotosaurus	I. fragilis	San Juan	lower Cancha de Bochas	Hyperodapedon-Exaeretodon-Herrerasaurus biozone	A right ilium	An obscure silesaurid dinosauromorph.	
Incertovenator	I. longicollum	San Juan	middle Cancha de Bochas	Hyperodapedon-Exaeretodon-Herrerasaurus biozone	Partial postcranial skeleton consisting of 23 articulated or semi-articulated vertebrae and a left ilium.	An archosauriform of uncertain phylogenetic placement with elongated neck vertebrae. It is most parsimonously placed as an archosaur, either among Aphanosauria or as the sister taxon to Mandasuchus.	
Pisanosaurus	P. mertii	La Rioja	Unknown ("upper levels")	Hyperodapedon biozone	"Fragmentary skull and skeleton"	An enigmatic herbivorous dinosauromorph. Originally described as the earliest species of ornithischian dinosaur in 1967, though many recent studies consider it to be a non-dinosaurian dinosauriform, potentially a silesaurid. Under the hypothesis that ornithischians are descended from silesaurids, these different positions are not mutually exclusive.	
Saurosuchus	S. galilei	San Juan	Cancha de Bochas, lower Valle de la Luna	Hyperodapedon-Exaeretodon-Herrerasaurus biozone, Exaeretodon biozone	A large number of specimens, including two well-preserved skulls.	A fairly common basal loricatan, part of the group historically known as "rauisuchians". By far the largest carnivore from the formation, with a total estimated body length of around 5.5 to 7 meters (18 to 23 ft). Like most other "rauisuchians", it was a quadrupedal predator, with serrated teeth, a laterally-compressed skull, and two rows of small osteoderms running down its back.	
Sillosuchus	S. longicervix	San Juan	middle Cancha de Bochas	Hyperodapedon-Exaeretodon-Herrerasaurus biozone	A partial skeleton missing the skull, and other isolated postcranial material.	A large shuvosaurid poposauroid, the only named shuvosaurid known from outside North America. The holotype individual had an estimated length of 3 m (9.8 ft), but an isolated vertebra referred to this species may belong to an individual up to 10 m (33 ft) long, making it one of the largest known pseudosuchians.	
Trialestes	T. romeri	San Juan, La Rioja	Cancha de Bochas	Hyperodapedon-Exaeretodon-Herrerasaurus biozone, Teyumbaita biozone,	Two partial skeletons. The holotype includes a partial skull while a referred specimen is semi-articulated.	A medium-sized crocodylomorph, one of the earliest members of the group. Once believed to be a primitive dinosaur due to its lightly built body plan.	
Venaticosuchus	V. rusconii	La Rioja	Unknown ("middle or upper levels")	Teyumbaita biozone,	Partial skull with forelimb material and osteoderms.	A medium-sized ornithosuchid, a type of scavenging or piscivorous pseudosuchian reaching up to 2 m (6.6 ft) in length.	
An unnamed lagerpetid	Unnamed	San Juan	Cancha de Bochas	Hyperodapedon-Exaeretodon-Herrerasaurus biozone	Distal end of the left femur	A lightly built pterosauromorph based on a femur discovered among the skeletal remains of the dinosaur Panphagia.	
An unnamed crocodylomorph	Unnamed	San Juan	Cancha de Bochas	Hyperodapedon-Exaeretodon-Herrerasaurus biozone	Five incomplete skeletons (specimens PVSJ 846, PVSJ 1078, PVSJ 1088, PVSJ 1089 and PVSJ 1090)	A new undescribed species of large-bodied crocodylomorph distinct from Trialestes.	

==== Other reptiles ====
Non-archosaur reptiles of the Ischigualasto Formation
Genus	Species	Province	Member	Biozone	Material	Notes	Images
Hyperodapedon	H. sanjuanensis	San Juan, La Rioja	La Peña, Cancha de Bochas	Hyperodapedon-Exaeretodon-Herrerasaurus biozone, Hyperodapedon biozone	Numerous (over 400) fossils including complete skulls and postcranial bones.	A large hyperodapedontine rhynchosaur, also known as Scaphonyx. By far the most abundant species in the formation, though its abundance declines exponentially past the earliest 100 meters. Like other advanced rhynchosaurs, it was a herbivore combining a protruding beak with multi-rowed tooth plates on the side of the jaw.	
Hyperodapedon	H. sp. nov.	La Rioja	Unknown	Hyperodapedon biozone	A partial skull and postcrania	A new unnamed species of Hyperodapedon from the Cerro Las Lajas area. More potential new species may be present due to the fact that several rhynchosaur tooth plate morphotypes are present in the formation.	
Proterochampsa	P. barrionuevoi	San Juan, La Rioja	upper La Peña, Cancha de Bochas, lower Valle de la Luna	Hyperodapedon-Exaeretodon-Herrerasaurus biozone, Teyumbaita biozone, Exaeretodon biozone	Multiple skulls, some of which are complete, and associated postcranial material.	A large and well-described proterochampsid archosauriform, with a massive flattened and ornamented skull averaging 50 centimetres (20 in) in length.	
Pseudochampsa	P. ischigualastensis	San Juan	lower Cancha de Bochas	Hyperodapedon-Exaeretodon-Herrerasaurus biozone	An articulated partial skeleton missing only the forelimbs.	A small proterochampsid archosauriform known from a well-preserved skeleton. Originally described a species of Chanaresuchus, and subsequently given its own genus.	
Taytalura	T. alcoberi	San Juan	lower Cancha de Bochas	Hyperodapedon-Exaeretodon-Herrerasaurus biozone	Partial skull.	A small stem-lepidosaur, distantly related to modern squamates (such as lizards) and sphenodonts (such as the tuatara).	
Teyumbaita	T. sp.	La Rioja	Unknown	Teyumbaita biozone	Numerous cranial and postcranial fossils, including a well-preserved partial skull.	A new unnamed species of the hyperodapedontine rhynchosaur Teyumbaita, which succeeds Hyperodapedon sanjuanensis in the Cerro Las Lajas area.	

=== Synapsids ===
==== Cynodonts ====
Cynodonts of the Ischigualasto Formation
Genus	Species	Province	Member	Biozone	Material	Notes	Images
Chiniquodon	C. sanjuanensis	San Juan	Cancha de Bochas	Hyperodapedon-Exaeretodon-Herrerasaurus biozone	Complete skull with jaws and partial postcranial skeleton.	A chiniquodontid Initially named as a species of Probelesodon, a genus which is now understood to be a junior synonym of Chiniquodon.	
Chiniquodon	C. cf. theotonicus	San Juan	Cancha de Bochas	Hyperodapedon-Exaeretodon-Herrerasaurus biozone	Three partial skulls.	A chiniquodontid, a dog-sized carnivore similar in ecological niche to some of the predatory dinosaurs it coexisted with.	
Diegocanis	D. elegans	San Juan	Cancha de Bochas	Hyperodapedon-Exaeretodon-Herrerasaurus biozone	Partial skull, represented by the snout and the orbital region, with partially preserved upper dentition.	An obscure ecteniniid.	
Ecteninion	E. lunensis	San Juan	Cancha de Bochas	Hyperodapedon-Exaeretodon-Herrerasaurus biozone	Complete skull with jaws and at least three additional specimens.	A ecteniniid known from a skull around 11 centimetres (4.3 in) in length.	
Exaeretodon	E. argentinus	San Juan, La Rioja	La Peña, Cancha de Bochas, Valle de la Luna	Hyperodapedon-Exaeretodon-Herrerasaurus biozone, Hyperodapedon biozone, Teyumbaita biozone, Exaeretodon biozone	Numerous (over 200) specimens, including a large number of complete skulls.	A large gomphodontosuchine traversodont, up to 1.8 meters (5.9 feet) in length. The most abundant synapsid in the Ischigualasto Formation and the second most abundant species overall, behind Hyperodapedon sanjuanensis. Like other traversodontids, it was a herbivore with a specialized chewing style. E. argentinus has a long list of potential junior synonyms, with Exaeretodon frenguellii as a particularly widespread alternative name.	
cf. Probainognathus	Indeterminate	San Juan	Cancha de Bochas	Hyperodapedon-Exaeretodon-Herrerasaurus biozone	Specimen PVSJ 410, a skull with jaws.	A small probainognathid close to the origin of mammaliaforms. The Ischigualasto skull provisionally referred to this genus is tiny, 3.5 centimetres (1.4 in) long. It is a juvenile, presumably belonging to an unnamed species.	
Pseudotherium	P. argentinus	San Juan	upper La Peña	Hyperodapedon-Exaeretodon-Herrerasaurus biozone	Specimen PVSJ 882, a cranium.	A prozostrodontid probainognathian closely related to tritylodontids. A small species with a narrow skull 6.9 centimetres (2.7 in) in length, discovered among the skeletal remains of the dinosaur Panphagia.	

==== Dicynodonts ====
Dicynodonts of the Ischigualasto Formation
Genus	Species	Province	Member	Biozone	Material	Notes	Images
Ischigualastia	I. jenseni	San Juan	Cancha de Bochas	Hyperodapedon-Exaeretodon-Herrerasaurus biozone	Over 20 specimens, five of which have been described: a complete undistorted skull, two complete compressed skulls, a partial skull with braincase material, and an ilium. Postcranial material is also present in each skull-bearing specimen.	An enormous stahleckeriine stahleckeriid. The skull is 55 centimetres (22 in) in length, tall and broad, with a short snout bearing pointed bony projections instead of tusks. The fourth most common species in the formation.	
Jachaleria	J. colorata	San Juan	Quebrada de la Sal	Jachaleria biozone	Nearly complete skull with jaws.	A large stahleckeriid restricted to the uppermost layers of the formation, distinct from all other Ischigualasto fossils. Brazilian species of Jachaleria reach around 3 metres (9.8 ft) in length with an estimated mass of 300 kilograms (660 lb), close in size to Dinodontosaurus.	

=== Temnospondyls ===
Temnospondyls of the Ischigualasto Formation
Genus	Species	Province	Member	Biozone	Material	Notes	Images
Pelorocephalus	P. ischigualastensis	San Juan	lower Cancha de Bochas	Hyperodapedon-Exaeretodon-Herrerasaurus biozone	"A skull with associated mandibles and interclavicle."	A chigutisaurid based on fragmentary material.	
Promastodonsaurus	P. bellmanni	San Juan	middle Valle de la Luna	Exaeretodon biozone	Skull, left clavicle, interclavicle.	A little-known mastodonsaurid (capitosaur).	

=== Plants ===
==== Palynomorphs ====
Palynomorphs are often separated into two biogeographic groups in Carnian-Norian Gondwana, using Australia as a guideline for distinguishing the two. One group is the Ipswich province, a temperate palynoflora (40° S) which developed in areas around the Triassic South Pole, equivalent to modern South Africa, southern Australia, most of Antarctica, and the southern part of South America. The second group is the Onslow province, a subtropical palynoflora (30-40° S) which is found further north in areas closer to the Tethys Sea, equivalent to India, Madagascar, East Africa, and northern Australia.

The Ischigualasto Formation, at around 40° S, is predicted to lie near the boundary between these two provinces. Palynomorphs have been found in the lower-mid part of the Valle de la Luna Member, about 330–350 meters above the base of the formation. There are strong similarities between the Ischigualasto Formation palynoflora and the Onslow province, as well as the palynoflora of Europe. Although the most abundant pollen types are standard among Triassic South America, eight rarer palynomorph species were previously unreported from the continent. Ischigualasto was the first formation reported to host distinctive Onslow province species in South America, and Western Gondwana as a whole. It helps to support the idea that the Onslow province rings around the middle latitudes of the entire Southern Hemisphere, rather than just the vicinity of the Tethys Sea.

Onslow province species have also been discovered in the Chañares Formation, but not the Los Rastros Formation, which retains South Polar species typical of the Ipswich province. This seems to contradict evidence from climate proxies which suggest the Los Rastros Formation was warmer and wetter than the Ischigualasto and Chañares formations, rather than cooler. The distinction between the Ipswich and Onslow palynofloras may be based on local environmental conditions (such as the availability of riparian or upland habitats) rather than regional climate.

==== Macrofossils ====
Most plant macrofossils are found in the lower to middle Valle de la Luna Member, unless stated otherwise. The Triassic plant assemblages of Argentina are divided into five biozones based on changes in floral composition through time. Most of the Valle de la Luna Member belongs to the late Carnian-age Yabeiella brackebuschiana/Scytophyllum neuburgianum/Rhexoxylon piatnitzkyi (BNP) biozone, the third in the sequence. The uppermost Valle de la Luna Member belongs to the early Norian-age Dicroidium odontopteroides/D. lancifolium (OL) biozone, the fourth in the sequence.

Plant macrofossils of the Ischigualasto Formation
Genus	Species	Province	Preservation types	Notes	Images
Agathoxylon	A. argentinum	San Juan	Silica permineralizations of wood.	Woody branches or thin trunks of an araucariacean conifer, only present in the upper Valle de la Luna Member. Branches could reach a diameter of 8 centimetres (3.1 in). Presumably a humid-adapted evergreen which retains leaves for up to two years. Previously considered an undescribed species of Araucarioxylon.	
Cladophlebis	C. mendozaensis			Leaves of an osmundacean fern.	
Dicroidium	D. lancifolium	San Juan	Horizontally oriented cuticles (F), as well as cuticles oriented obliquely with respect to the bedding plane (G).	Leaves of a corystosperm "seed fern". Most common in the upper Valle de la Luna Member.	
Dicroidium	D. odontopteroides	San Juan	Horizontally oriented cuticles (F), as well as cuticles oriented obliquely with respect to the bedding plane (G).	Leaves of a corystosperm "seed fern". Most common in the upper Valle de la Luna Member. Includes a double-forked leaf previously considered a distinct genus and species, Tetraptilon heteromerum.	
Dicroidium	D. zuberi	San Juan	Isolated stacks of leaf cuticle, so-called 'litter bags'.	Leaves of a corystosperm "seed fern", sometimes considered a species of Zuberia.	
Ginkgoites	G. sp.			Leaves of a ginkgoale.	
Heidiphyllum	H. elongatum	San Juan		Leaves of a podocarp or voltzialean conifer. Only present in the upper Valle de la Luna Member.	
Johnstonia	J. coriacea	San Juan		Leaves of a corystosperm "seed fern". Some authors refer this species to Dicroidium.	
Johnstonia	J. stelzneriana		Horizontally oriented cuticles (F), as well as cuticles oriented obliquely with respect to the bedding plane (G).	Leaves of a corystosperm "seed fern". Some authors refer this species to Dicroidium.	
Lepidopteris	L. stormbergensis	San Juan		Leaves of a peltasperm "seed fern".	
Michelilloa	M. waltonii	San Juan	Silicified stem.	A cycad stem with a preserved diameter of about 10 centimetres (3.9 in).	
Neocalamites	N. carrerei	San Juan	Horizontally oriented impressions (F).	Stem and leaf impressions of a common equisetopsid (horsetail).	
Protojuniperoxylon	P. ischigualastensis	San Juan	Silicified wood.	Wood of an evergreen cupressacean conifer.	
Pterophyllum	P. sp.			Leaves of a bennettitale.	
Rhexoxylon	R. piatnitzkyi	La Rioja, San Juan	Vertical silicified trunks and stumps (D), as well as horizontal or oblique silicified tree trunks (E).	Stems, branches, trunks, and other wood of a common corystosperm "seed fern", presumably the same plant which produces Dicroidium leaves. Some trunks could reach a diameter of 50 centimetres (20 in).	
Scytophyllum	S. neubergianum	San Juan	Cuticle impressions.	Leaves of a peltasperm "seed fern".	
Taeniopteris	T. sp.			Indeterminate leaves possibly belonging to bennettitales or cycads.	
Xylopteris	X. argentina		Horizontally oriented cuticles (F), as well as cuticles oriented obliquely with respect to the bedding plane (G).	Leaves of a corystosperm "seed fern". Some authors refer this species to Dicroidium.	
Xylopteris	X. elongata	San Juan	Horizontally oriented cuticles (F), as well as cuticles oriented obliquely with respect to the bedding plane (G).	Leaves of a corystosperm "seed fern". Some authors refer this species to Dicroidium.	
Yabeiella	Y. brackebuschiana			A possible gnetopsid or cycad.	
Yabeiella	Y. mareyesiaca			A possible gnetopsid or cycad.	
Yabeiella	Y. sp.			A possible gnetopsid or cycad.	
Zuberia	Z. papillata	San Juan		Leaves of a corystosperm "seed fern" similar to Dicroidium, and sometimes referred to the genus.	

== See also ==
- Quebrada del Barro Formation, contemporaneous fossiliferous formation of the Marrayel-El Carrizal Basin
- Candelária Formation, contemporaneous fossiliferous formation of the Paraná Basin
- Molteno Formation, contemporaneous fossiliferous formation of the Karoo Basin in southern Africa
- Fremouw Formation, contemporaneous fossiliferous formation of Antarctica
- Denmark Hill Insect Bed, contemporaneous fossiliferous unit of Queensland, Australia
- Madygen Formation, contemporaneous Lagerstätte of Central Asia
