= Diegocanis =

Diegocanis Temporal range: Carnian

Scientific classification
- Kingdom: Animalia
- Phylum: Chordata
- Clade: Synapsida
- Clade: Therapsida
- Clade: Cynodontia
- Family: †Ecteniniidae
- Genus: †Diegocanis; Martínez et al. 2013

Type species
- †Diegocanis elegans Martínez et al. 2013

Extinct genus of cynodonts

Diegocanis is an extinct genus of cynodonts from the Late Triassic (Carnian) of Argentina. The type species, Diegocanis elegans, was named in 2013 from fossils found in the Cancha de Bochas Member of the Ischigualasto Formation in the Ischigualasto-Villa Unión Basin. Diegocanis was classified within a new family of probainognathian cynodonts called Ecteniniidae, along with the genera Ecteninion and Trucidocynodon.
