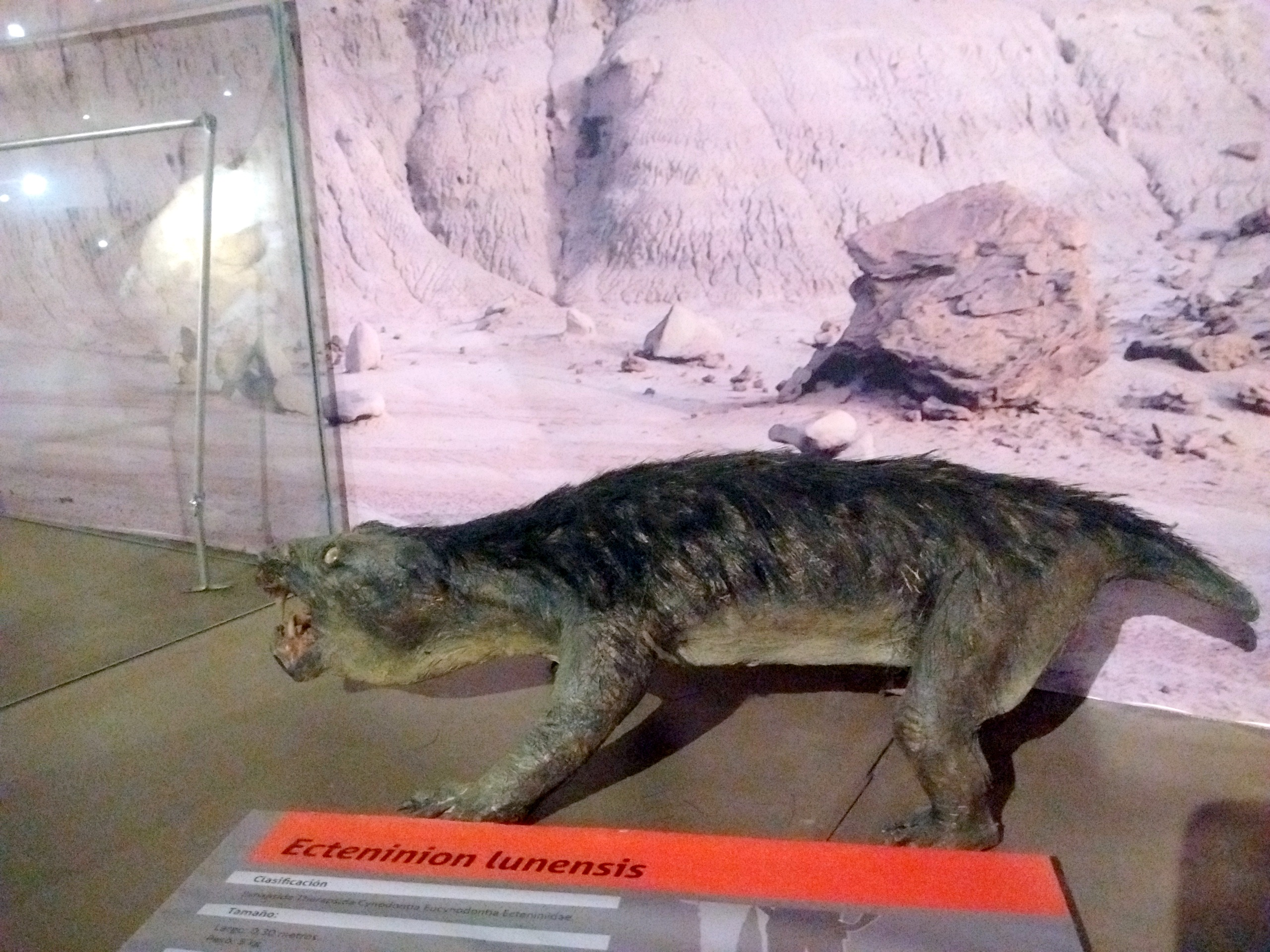
- Model

Scientific classification
- Domain: Eukaryota
- Kingdom: Animalia
- Phylum: Chordata
- Clade: Synapsida
- Clade: Therapsida
- Clade: Cynodontia
- Family: †Ecteniniidae
- Genus: †Ecteninion; Martínez et al. 1996

Type species
- †Ecteninion lunensis Martínez et al. 1996

Synonyms
- Ectenion (sic) Stefanello et al. 2023

= Ecteninion =

Ecteninion Temporal range: Carnian

Extinct genus of cynodonts

Ecteninion is an extinct genus of meat-eating cynodonts that lived during the Late Triassic (Carnian) in South America. The type species Ecteninion lunensis was named by R.N. Martinez, C.L. May, and C.A. Forster in 1996. The holotype of E. lunensis is PVSJ 422, it's known from a nearly complete skull of about 11 centimetres (4.3 in) in length. It was found in the Cancha de Bochas Member of the Ischigualasto Formation in the Ischigualasto-Villa Unión Basin in northwestern Argentina. It has been interpreted as a basal eucynodont. The holotype is in the collection of the Universidad Nacional de San Juan.

== Body size ==
Although specimens larger than the holotype are present in the Ischigualasto Formation, they are notably smaller than Trucidocynodon from the Santa Maria Formation.

== Phylogeny ==
Ecteninion in a cladogram after Hopson & Kitching (2001):

- Eucynodontia
  - Probainognathia
    - Lumkuia
    - - Ecteninion
      - - - Probelesodon
          - - Chiniquodon
            - Aleodon
        - - Probainognathus
          - - Pachygenelus
            - Morganucodon
  - Cynognathia

Cladogram after Stefanello et al. (2023):

- Ecteniniidae
  - Trucidocynodon
  - - Ectenion (sic)
    - Diegocanis
