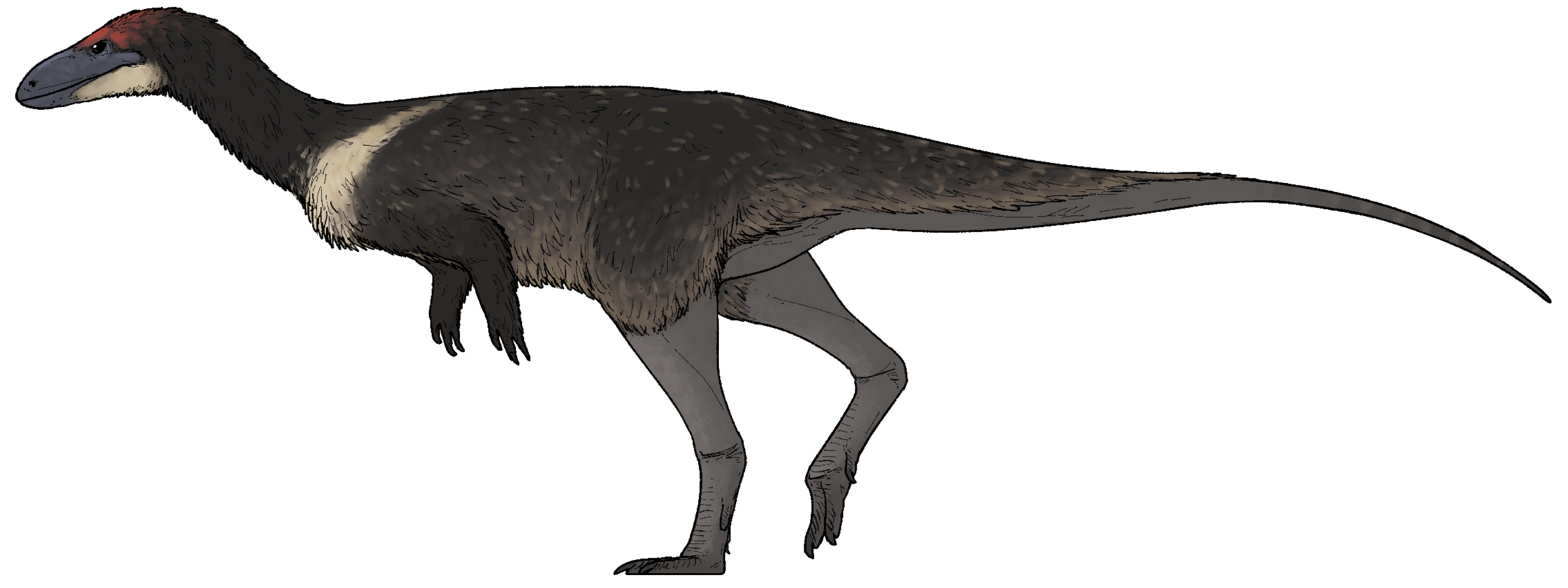
- Speculative life restoration

Scientific classification
- Kingdom: Animalia
- Phylum: Chordata
- Class: Reptilia
- Clade: Dinosauria
- Clade: Saurischia
- Clade: Theropoda
- Genus: †Anteavis; Martínez et al., 2025
- Species: †A. crurilongus

Binomial name
- †Anteavis crurilongus Martínez et al., 2025

= Anteavis =

Anteavis Temporal range: Late Triassic (late Carnian), 231.4–225.9 Ma

Genus of theropod dinosaurs

Anteavis (lit. 'before birds') is an extinct genus of early theropod dinosaurs known from the Late Triassic (Carnian age) Ischigualasto Formation of Argentina. The genus contains a single species, Anteavis crurilongus, known from a partial skeleton and skull.

== Discovery and naming ==
Anteavis type locality atIschigualasto Provincial Park, Argentina

The Anteavis holotype specimen, PVSJ 1085, was discovered in outcrops of the Cancha de Bochas Member of the Ischigualasto Formation in Ischigualasto Provincial Park of San Juan Province, northwestern Argentina. The specimen, which is accessioned at the Institute and Museum of Natural Sciences (Instituto y Museo de Ciencias Naturales) of the National University of San Juan, consists of a partial skeleton of a single individual. The preserved skull bones include the left maxilla and right dentary (upper and lower tooth-bearing bones), the left prefrontal (bone near the upper margin of the orbit, to the side of the skull roof), and part of both pterygoids and the right ectopterygoid (palate bones). Several vertebrae are preserved from various regions of the body, including four cervical (neck), ten dorsal (back), four sacral, and six caudal (tail) vertebrae. The remaining elements belong to the limbs and girdles. Part of the right scapulocoracoid, both humeri and the ends of the right ulna (upper and lower forelimb bones), a possible phalanx of digit III, and part of what may be the ungual (claw) of digit I are preserved from the forelimb and pectoral region. The hindlimb and pelvic region preserves a complete and articulated pelvis (ilium, pubis, and ischium), the left femur, right tibia, and an end from both fibulae (upper and lower hindlimb bones), in addition to the left astragalus, tarsals, and metatarsus, the right metatarsal of the digit II, and left phalanges of digit I and II.

In 2025, Ricardo N. Martínez and colleagues described Anteavis crurilongus as a new genus and species of early theropod dinosaur based on these fossil remains. The generic name, Anteavis, combines the Latin words ante, meaning 'preceding' or 'before', and avis, meaning 'bird'. This alludes to the ancestral anatomy of the genus compared to birds, the only extant theropods. The specific name, crurilongus, combines the Latin words crus, meaning 'leg',and longus, meaning 'long', in reference to the proportionally elongate lower hindlimb.

Putative dorsosacral (A, B) and caudosacral (C, D) vertebrae of the A. crurilongus holotype

== Classification ==
In their 2025 phylogenetic analysis, Martínez and colleagues recovered Anteavis as a basally-branching member of the Theropoda, diverging after the coeval Eodromaeus. These results are displayed in the cladogram below:

- Dinosauria
  - Ornithischia
  - Saurischia
    - Herrerasauria
    - - Sauropodomorpha
      - Theropoda
        - Eodromaeus
        - - Anteavis
          - - Lepidus
            - Neotheropoda
