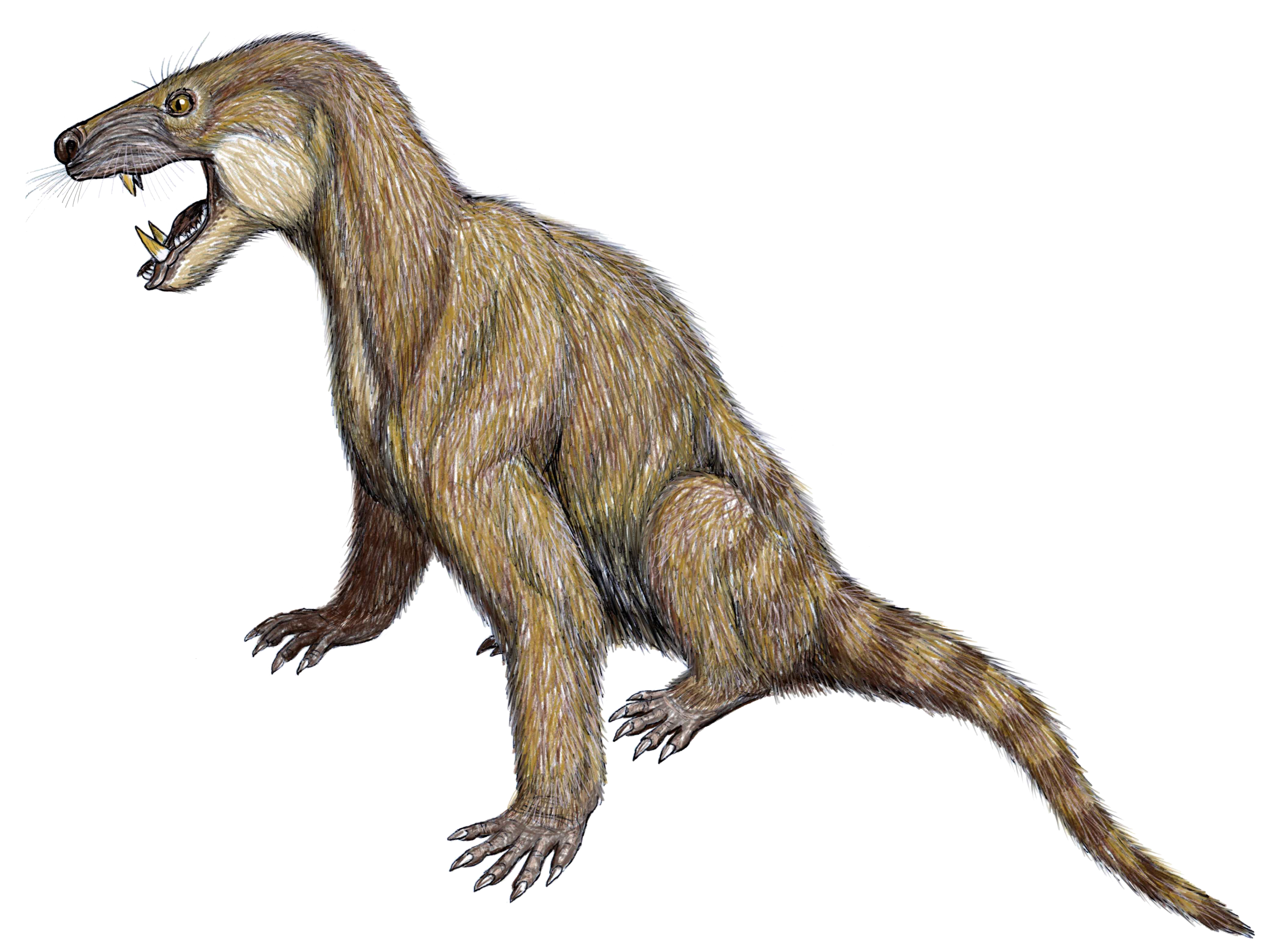
- Life restoration of the ecteniniid Trucidocynodon riograndensis

Scientific classification
- Kingdom: Animalia
- Phylum: Chordata
- Clade: Synapsida
- Clade: Therapsida
- Clade: Cynodontia
- Clade: Probainognathia
- Family: †Ecteniniidae; Martínez et al., 2013

Genera
- †Diegocanis; †Ecteninion; †Trucidocynodon

= Ecteniniidae =

Ecteniniidae Temporal range: Late Triassic, Norian

Extinct family of cynodonts

Ecteniniidae is an extinct family of probainognathian cynodonts from the Triassic of South America. They are notable for their large size, as well as for being among the first synapsids with specializations towards cursoriality.

== Phylogeny ==
Below is a cladogram from Martínez et al. (2013):

- Cynodontia
  - Procynosuchus
  - - Galesaurus
    - - Thrinaxodon
      - - Platycraniellus
        - Eucynodontia
          - Cynognathia
          - Probainognathia
            - Lumkuia
            - - Chiniquodon
              - - Probainognathus
                - - Ecteniniidae
                    - Diegocanis
                    - Ecteninion
                    - Trucidocynodon
                  - Prozostrodontia
                    - Prozostrodon
                    - - Therioherpeton
                      - - Tritylodontidae
                          - Oligokyphus
                          - Tritylodon
                          - - Bienotherium
                            - Kayentatherium
                        - - Pachygenelus
                          - Riograndia
                          - - Brasilodon
                            - Mammaliaformes
                              - Adelobasileus
                              - - Sinoconodon
                                - Morganucodon
