= Redoximorphic features =

Redoximorphic features (RMFs) consist of color patterns in a soil that are caused by loss (depletion) or gain (concentration) of pigment compared to the matrix color, formed by oxidation/reduction of iron and/or manganese coupled with their removal, translocation, or accrual; or a soil matrix color controlled by the presence of iron (2+) The composition and responsible formation processes for a soil color or color pattern must be known or inferred before it can be described as an RMF.
