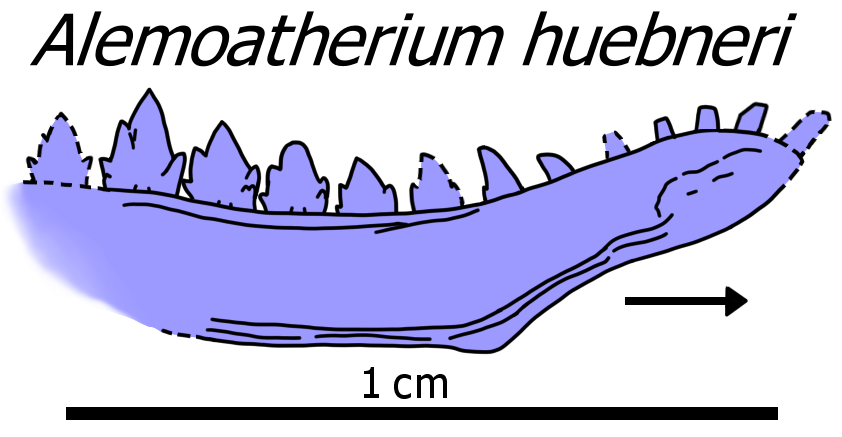
- Diagram of the lower jaw in medial view

Scientific classification
- Kingdom: Animalia
- Phylum: Chordata
- Clade: Synapsida
- Clade: Therapsida
- Clade: Cynodontia
- Clade: Prozostrodontia
- Genus: †Alemoatherium; Martinelli et al., 2017

Type species
- Alemoatherium huebneri Martinelli et al., 2017

= Alemoatherium =

Alemoatherium Temporal range: Late Carnian

Extinct genus of cynodonts

Alemoatherium is an extinct genus of prozostrodontian cynodont which lived in the Late Triassic of Brazil. It contains a single species, A. huebneri, named in 2017 by Agustín Martinelli and colleagues. The genus is based on UFSM 11579b, a left lower jaw (dentary) found in the Alemoa Member of the Santa Maria Formation, preserving the late Carnian-age Hyperodapedon Assemblage Zone. Alemoatherium was among the smallest species of cynodonts found in the rich synapsid fauna of the Santa Maria Formation. Its blade-like four-cusped postcanine teeth show many similarities with those of dromatheriids, an obscure group of early prozostrodontians.

== Description ==
The dentary is similar in shape to that of many other prozostrodontians, with an overall slender form that abruptly changes angle near the front of the jaw. This distinct change in angle separates the dentary into two main regions, the horizontal ramus behind the level of the first postcanine tooth, and the upwards-tilted anterodorsal process in front of the first postcanine. Seen in medial (inside) view, the dentary has a faint groove along the tooth row and a much more prominent Meckelian groove parallel to its lower edge. A short and smoothly rounded ridge is visible in medial view close to the front of the dentary. This corresponds to the unfused symphysis, where the left and right jaws connect to each other at the chin.

=== Dentition ===
Alemoatherium has five incisors, one canine, and at least seven postcanines on its lower jaw. Though none of the incisors are fully preserved, the largest would have been the first incisor (i1), indicated by an alveolus (tooth socket) which was strongly procumbent (oriented forwards) and circular in cross section. The second incisor (i2) was smaller and strongly worn on the labial (cheek) side. The third, fourth, and fifth incisors (i3-i5) are similar but smaller still. The single canine tooth (c1) is quite small, with a straight distal (rear) edge and no apparent serrations. The first postcanine tooth (pc1) is similar to the canine but larger, with a tiny second cusp behind the main cusp. The second postcanine (pc2) is not preserved but it would have been slightly larger than pc1.

The third postcanine (pc3) has four main cusps: the large main cusp (a), preceded by a small cusp (b), and followed by two more small cusps (c and d). This tooth is a fairly typical cynodont sectorial (flesh-slicing tooth), with a continuous sharp cutting surface from cusp a back to cusp c. Cusp b is set slightly more labial (towards the cheek) and separated by a groove, while the tiny cusp d is set low and has a straight lingual (towards the tongue) edge. The fourth postcanine (pc4) is significantly larger, with a tall cusp a with a convex labial surface. Cusp b is small and set low on the crown. An additional cingular cusp is positioned below the lingual surface of cusp b. Cusp c is the second-largest in the tooth, separated from cusp a by a sharp notch. Cusp d is very small and leans back. There is a vertical groove on the side of the root, the predecessor condition to a bifurcated root. The even larger fifth postcanine (pc5) is similar to the fourth, though cusp b is taller, cusp d curves further, and two cingular cusps are positioned below cusp b rather than just one. The sixth postcanine (pc6) is similar to its predecessors and is the largest preserved tooth in the jaw, though it has only one cingular cusp. The seventh postcanine (pc7) is not preserved, but its alveolus indicates that it was around the size of pc3.

== Classification ==
The unfused mandibular symphysis and constricted roots of the lower postcanines support the placement of Alemoatherium within Prozostrodontia, a clade of cynodonts including mammaliaforms and many of their Late Triassic relatives, from Prozostrodon crownwards. Among its Brazilian contemporaries, Alemoatherium shares some similarities with probainognathids (postcanine tooth shape), Protheriodon (slender jaw, high number of incisors), Santacruzgnathus (slender jaw, distinct Meckelian groove), and brasilodontids (overall jaw and tooth shape). However, all of these taxa also possess traits contradicting the remains of Alemoatherium. The teeth of Alemoatherium share many similarities to those of dromatheriids, a poorly-known group of cynodonts found in North America, Europe, and India. Its dentary was also very similar to those of dromatheriids such as Microconodon and Dromatherium, supporting their connection further.

Below is a cladogram showing the results of Martinelli et al. (2017)'s phylogenetic analysis (excluding Santacruzgnathus, Microconodon, and Charruodon).

- Probainognathia
  - Ecteninion
  - - Chiniquodon
    - - Probainognathidae
      - - Protheriodon
        - Prozostrodontia
          - Prozostrodon
          - Therioherpeton
          - Alemoatherium
          - - Tritheledontidae
            - - Tritylodontidae
              - - Botucaraitherium
                - - Brasilodontidae
                  - - Adelobasileus
                    - - Sinoconodon
                      - - Mammaliaformes
