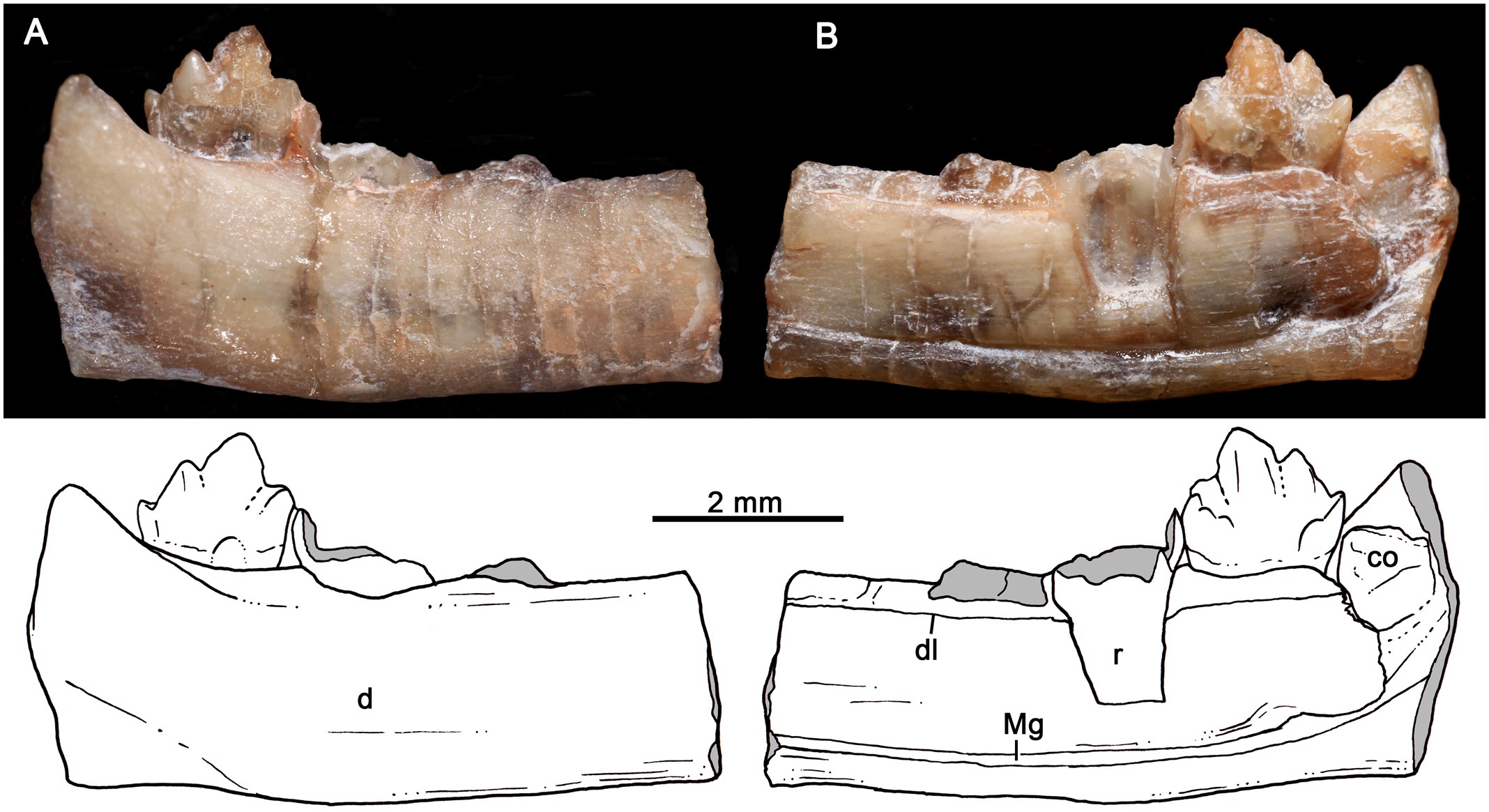
- Photos and drawings of the holotype

Scientific classification
- Kingdom: Animalia
- Phylum: Chordata
- Clade: Synapsida
- Clade: Therapsida
- Clade: Cynodontia
- Clade: Prozostrodontia
- Genus: †Santacruzgnathus; Martinelli et al., 2016
- Species: †S. abdalai

Binomial name
- †Santacruzgnathus abdalai Martinelli et al., 2016

= Santacruzgnathus =

Santacruzgnathus Temporal range: Carnian

Extinct genus of cynodonts

Santacruzgnathus is an extinct genus of small cynodonts from the Late Triassic (Carnian) Santacruzodon Assemblage Zone of Brazil. It contains one species, S. abdalai. Santacruzgnathus is known from a single partial lower jaw with four postcanine teeth, only one of which is well-preserved. Some features of the specimen, including the slender shape of the jaw and the incipiently double-rooted teeth, indicate that the animal was an early member of Prozostrodontia, a group that includes mammals and their close relatives.

== Discovery and naming ==
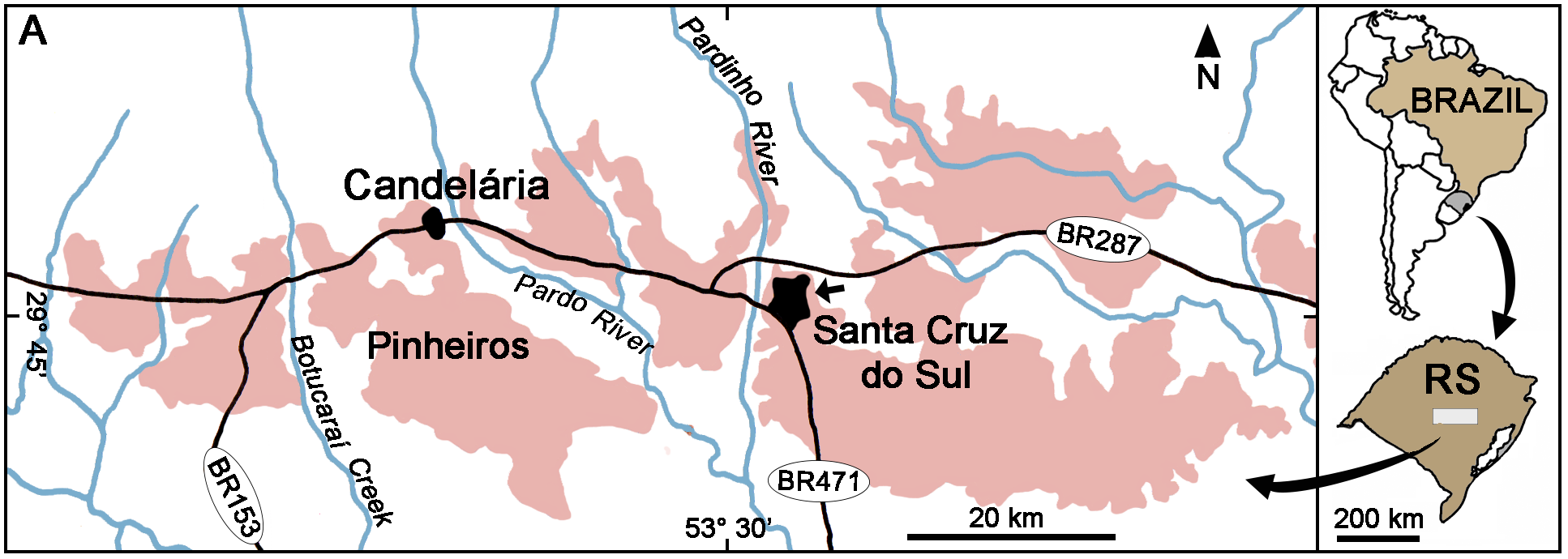
Map showing the Middle to Late Triassic outcrops of the municipalities of Candelária and Santa Cruz do Sul. The location where Santacruzgnathus was found is marked by an arrow.

The holotype and only known specimen of Santacruzgnathus (UFRGS-PV-1121-T) consists of a partial right dentary bone with a well-preserved final postcanine tooth and fragments of three other postcanines. The specimen was discovered at the Schoenstatt site near the town of Santa Cruz do Sul within the state of Rio Grande do Sul. The outcrop in which the specimen was found belongs to the Santa Cruz Sequence of the Santa Maria Supersequence, which has been dated to the early Carnian age of the Late Triassic. The specimen was first described in a 2011 paper by Soares et al. They interpreted it as a juvenile, and provisionally assigned it to cf. Probainognathus due to similarities with Probainognathus juveniles from the Chañares Formation of Argentina, as well as a supposed juvenile Probainognathus specimen from the Argentine Ischigualasto Formation.

The specimen was redescribed in a 2016 paper by Martinelli et al. They identified it as a new species of cynodont unrelated to Probainognathus, which was given the name Santacruzgnathus abdalai. The generic name derives from Santa Cruz do Sul where the holotype was found, and the Neo-Latin word gnathus meaning a lower jaw. The specific epithet abdalai references the Argentine palaeontologist Fernando Abdala. The authors reinterpreted the holotype as a likely subadult or adult; the last postcanine is fully erupted in the specimen, which is usually not the case in juvenile cynodonts.

== Description ==
While only a small portion of the dentary is preserved, the bone appears to have been quite slender, as was the case with many early prozostrodontians. On the lingual (inner) side near the lower edge of the bone, a thin meckelian groove can be seen. Behind the tooth row, most of the coronoid process has broken off with only the base remaining. On the lingual side of the coronoid process, part of the coronoid bone has been preserved.

Of the four teeth preserved in the specimen, the first two are represented only by fragmentary roots, while the third also preserves part of the base of the crown. Unlike the others, the fourth tooth is nearly complete. The crown bears a large central cusp (cusp a), a small front cusp (cusp b), a rear cusp (cusp c) somewhat larger than cusp b, and an even smaller cusp d behind cusp c. Cusp a is symmetrical and not recurved. The tip of cusp b is broken off. Cusp b is shifted somewhat towards the labial (outer) side of the tooth, and is separated from cusp a by a deep groove. On the lingual side of the tooth, there is a discontinuous cingulum divided into mesiolingual (front) and distolingual (back) portions. The mesiolingual cingulum has a crenulated edge but no distinct cusps. The root is not fully divided, but has a prominent constriction on the labial side, as seen in most early prozostrodontians.

== Classification ==
Based on features of its jaw and teeth, Martinelli et al. (2016) interpreted Santacruzgnathus as a member of Prozostrodontia, a group of probainognathian cynodonts that includes mammals and close relatives of them. The genus was however not included in any phylogenetic analysis in that paper. In 2017, the prozostrodontian Alemoatherium was described by Martinelli et al. Three phylogenetic analyses were performed, two of which included Santacruzgnathus. The resulting cladograms placed Santacruzgnathus within a large polytomy at the base of Prozostrodontia. The cladogram from the third analysis is shown below:

- Probainognathia
  - Ecteninion
  - - Chiniquodon
    - - Bonacynodon
      - Charruodon
      - Probainognathus
      - Protheriodon
      - Prozostrodontia
        - Alemoatherium
        - Microconodon
        - Pachygenelus
        - Prozostrodon
        - Riograndia
        - Santacruzgnathus
        - Therioherpeton
        - - Oligokyphus
          - - Kayentatherium
            - - Bienotherium
              - Tritylodon
        - - Botucaraitherium
          - - - Brasilitherium
              - Brasilodon
            - - Adelobasileus
              - - Morganucodon
                - Sinoconodon
