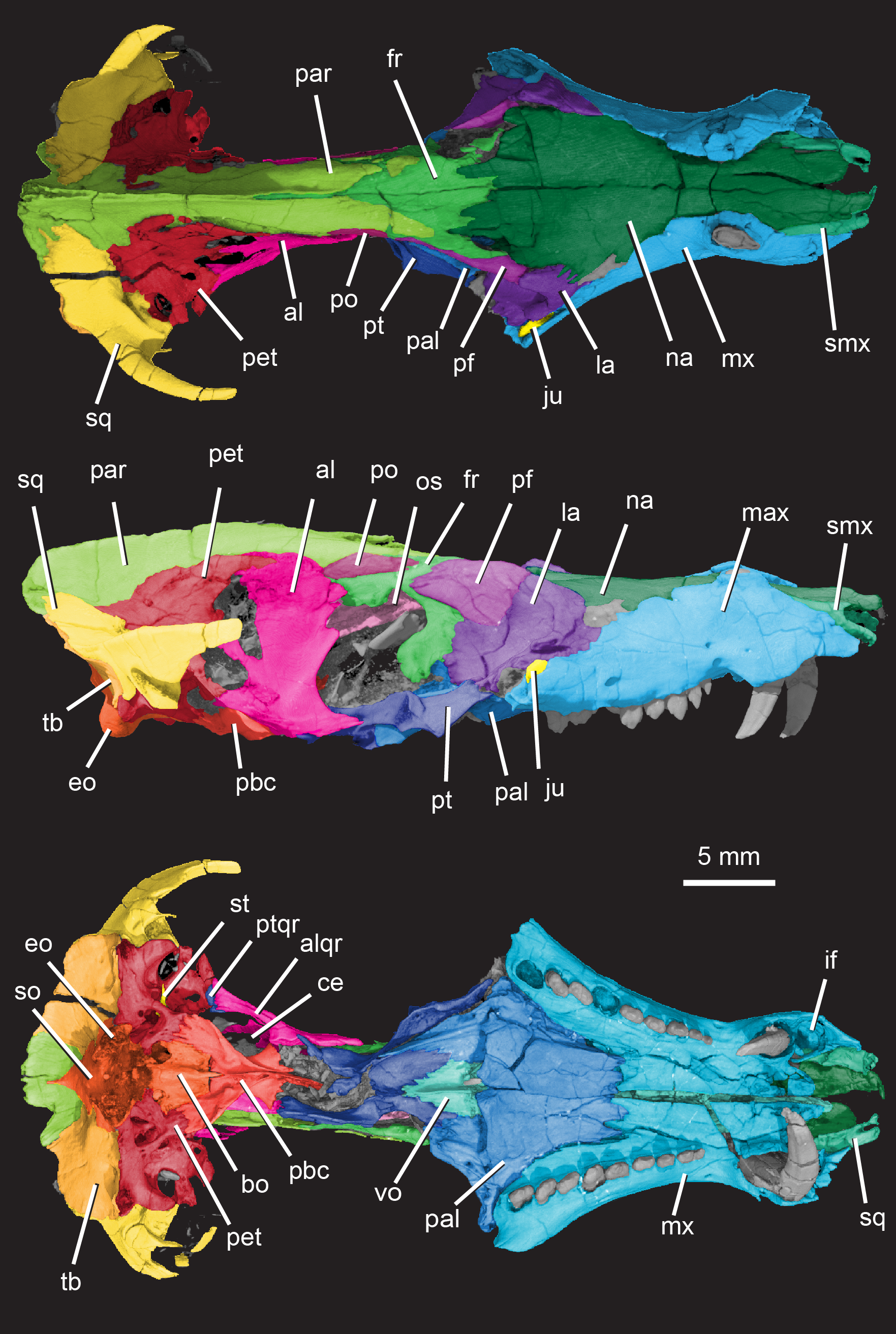
- 3D rendering of the holotype skull

Scientific classification
- Kingdom: Animalia
- Phylum: Chordata
- Clade: Synapsida
- Clade: Therapsida
- Clade: Cynodontia
- Clade: Prozostrodontia
- Genus: †Pseudotherium; Wallace et al., 2019
- Species: †P. argentinus

Binomial name
- †Pseudotherium argentinus Wallace et al., 2019

= Pseudotherium =

Pseudotherium Temporal range: Carnian, ~231.4 Ma

Extinct genus of cynodonts

Pseudotherium ("false beast") is an extinct genus of prozostrodontian cynodonts from the Late Triassic of Argentina. It contains one species, P. argentinus, which was first described in 2019 from remains found in the La Peña Member of the Ischigualasto Formation in the Ischigualasto-Villa Unión Basin.

== Discovery and naming ==
The holotype and only known specimen, PVSJ 882, was discovered in 2006 by Argentine palaeontologist Ricardo N. Martínez during an expedition to the Ischigualasto Formation. It consists of a partial skull lacking the lower jaw, quadrate bones and most of the zygomatic arches and premaxillae.

The generic name Pseudotherium is derived from the Greek words pseudo, meaning "false", and therios, meaning "beast". The specific name argentinus references the country of Argentina where it was found.

== Description ==
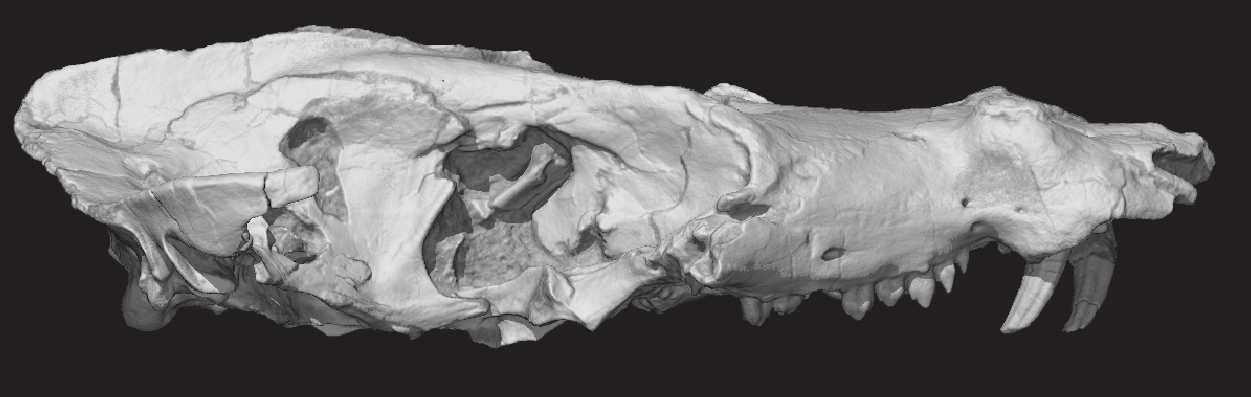
Holotype skull

Pseudotherium would have been a relatively large cynodont; excluding its missing premaxillae, the holotype skull is 69 millimetres (2.7 in) in length. Running along the top of the skull was a prominent sagittal crest (an attachment point for jaw muscles). Like Prozostrodon, a contemporary prozostrodontian from Brazil, it possessed remnants of the prefrontal and postorbital bones. Most mammaliamorphs, on the other hand, lacked any trace of these bones.

The snout of Pseudotherium is long and slender. As the premaxillae are incomplete, no incisors have been preserved. The canines were thin and curved, with unique longitudinal ridges on each side. Behind the canines were nine pairs of postcanine teeth; these were separated from the canines by a short diastema. The postcanines resembled those of Botucaraitherium and the brasilodontids, possessing three main cusps in a roughly symmetrical arrangement. The seventh and eighth postcanines also bore two and three accessory cusps, respectively. Unlike in tritylodontids and mammaliaforms, the roots were incompletely divided.

== Classification ==
The following cladogram is from the phylogenetic analysis of Wallace et al., 2019. Pseudotherium was placed within Mammaliamorpha as the sister taxon of Tritylodontidae, a largely Jurassic group of mammaliamorphs. The authors however noted that Pseudotherium might be more basal than the cladogram suggests, possibly forming a polytomy with tritheledontids, tritylodontids and brasilodontids instead.

- Probainognathia
  - Probainognathus
  - - Prozostrodon
    - - Therioherpeton
      - - Tritheledontidae
        - Mammaliamorpha
          - - Pseudotherium
            - Tritylodontidae
          - - Botucaraitherium
            - - Brasilodontidae
              - - Sinoconodon
                - Mammaliaformes

A 2023 paper by Stefanello et al., describing a nearly complete new skull of Prozostrodon, recovered Pseudotherium as the sister taxon of that genus, with the two genera forming the clade Prozostrodontidae at the base of Prozostrodontia. A cladogram from that study is shown below:

- Probainognathia
  - Lumkuia
  - - Chiniquodon
    - Probainognathidae
    - - Ecteniniidae
      - - Protheriodon
        - Prozostrodontia
          - Prozostrodontidae
            - Prozostrodon
            - Pseudotherium
          - - Therioherpeton
            - - Irajatherium
              - - Riograndia
                - - - Diarthrognathus
                    - Pachygenelus
                  - - Tritylodontidae
                    - - Botucaraitherium
                      - - Brasilodon
                        - Mammaliaformes
