= Prozostrodon =

Prozostrodon Temporal range: Late Triassic (Carnian), ~233.23 Ma
- Skeletal anatomy of P. brasiliensis

Scientific classification
- Kingdom: Animalia
- Phylum: Chordata
- Clade: Synapsida
- Clade: Therapsida
- Clade: Cynodontia
- Clade: †Prozostrodontidae
- Genus: †Prozostrodon; Bonaparte & Barberena, 2001
- Species: †P. brasiliensis

Binomial name
- †Prozostrodon brasiliensis (Bonaparte & Barberena, 2001)

Synonyms
- Thrinaxodon brasiliensis Barberena et al., 1987

Extinct genus of cynodont

Prozostrodon is an extinct genus of probainognathian cynodont that was closely related to mammals. The remains were found in Brazil and are dated to the Carnian age of the Late Triassic. The holotype has an estimated skull length of 6.7 centimetres (2.6 in), indicating that the whole animal may have been the size of a cat. The teeth were typical of advanced cynodonts, and the animal was probably a carnivore hunting reptiles and other small prey.

== Discovery and naming ==
Known localities of P. brasiliensis fossils

Prozostrodon brasiliensis was originally described as a species of Thrinaxodon in a 1987 paper by Mário C. Barberena, José F. Bonaparte and A. M. Sá Teixeira. The holotype (UFRGS-PV-0248-T) includes a well-preserved skull preserving the front half of the cranium, a mostly complete lower jaw and all of the teeth, but missing most of the braincase, sagittal crest and zygomatic arches. It also preserves multiple postcranial elements, including parts of the vertebral column, ribs, interclavicle, humeri, right ilium, femora and right foot. The specimen was found at the Faixa Nova locality in the municipality of Candelária, Rio Grande do Sul, in layers belonging to the Candelária Sequence of the Santa Maria Supersequence. It is deposited in the palaeontology museum of the UFRGS. The assignment of the species to Thrinaxodon was disputed by Battail (1991), who instead suggested that it might be a member of Chiniquodontidae, a group of cynodonts closer to mammals than Thrinaxodon. A 2001 redescription by Bonaparte & Barberena indicated that T. brasiliensis was indeed more closely related to mammals than to the other Thrinaxodon species; as a result, it was reclassified into the new genus Prozostrodon. The generic name references the well-developed cingulum of the lower postcanines, being derived from the Greek word zoster, meaning a girdle or band, and the Latin prefix pro-, meaning "before". A 2018 histological analysis found that the holotype represents a subadult, as its bones were still growing when it died.

A second specimen (CAPPA/UFSM 0123) was described in 2018 from the Marchezan locality in the municipality of São João do Polêsine. It consists of a right dentary bone preserving three postcanine teeth. Because of its small size and lack of a diastema behind the canine, this specimen is thought to be a juvenile.

A third specimen (UFRGS-PV-0543-T) was described in 2020 from the Faixa Nova locality, consisting of the front part of the cranium and fragments of the right dentary. This specimen notably preserves a natural endocast of the nasal cavity.

In 2023, a nearly complete skull (CAPPA/UFSM 0210) was described from the Marchezan locality. Unlike any of the other known specimens, it preserves the back portion of the skull, including the basicranium.

== Description ==
With the holotype having an estimated skull length of 6.7 centimetres (2.6 in), Prozostrodon was considerably larger than the other prozostrodontians (Alemoatherium and Therioherpeton) from its locality.

=== Skull ===
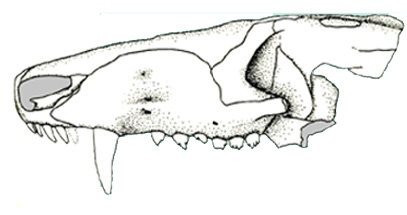
Illustration of the holotype skull

On the snout tip, the premaxilla bore a narial process that connected with the nasal bone. Further back, the premaxilla had a thin posterodorsal process that was wedged between the septomaxilla and maxilla. Above the eye socket (orbit), Prozostrodon retained small prefrontal and postorbital bones, unlike in most other prozostrodontians where these bones are completely absent. The postorbital bar, which had divided the eye socket from the temporal fenestra in earlier cynodonts, was missing in Prozostrodon, as in most other prozostrodontians. Within the eye socket, there was a broad contact between the frontal, palatine and orbitosphenoid bones. A small hole called the sphenopalatine foramen was present within the eye socket, as in other prozostrodontians. In Prozostrodon the foramen was completely enclosed by the palatine bone, unlike in some later prozostrodontians like Brasilodon and Morganucodon, where the foramen was bordered by both the orbitosphenoid and palatine. The secondary (hard) palate extended slightly behind the last postcanine tooth. On the lingual (inner) side of the upper postcanines, there was a deep groove where the lower teeth would have fit when the mouth was closed.

The lower jaw consisted primarily of the dentary bone. The dentary was fairly robust, with an upturned tip. The symphysis (joint) between the two halves of the dentary was unfused. More basal probainognathians generally had a fused symphysis, and an unfused symphysis is one of the main synapomorphies (shared derived features) of Prozostrodontia. At the rear end of the dentary, behind the tooth row, a somewhat tall and broad coronoid process extended upwards. Behind the coronoid process, there was a backwards-pointing projection called the articular process. In modern mammals, the articular process bears a dentary condyle that articulates with the squamosal bone of the cranium, but this condyle was absent in Prozostrodon. On the lingual side of the dentary, a meckelian groove stretched from near the symphysis to the rear part of the bone.

=== Teeth ===
Like most cynodonts, Prozostrodon had a heterodont dentition divided into incisors, canines and postcanines (cheek teeth). There were four pairs of incisors in both the upper and lower jaws. The lower incisors were somewhat procumbent (forwards-pointing) with recurved tips, and decreased in size further back in the mouth. Conversely, the upper incisors were backwards-pointing, and increased in size further back. The canines were large, and the lower one had fine serrations on its back edge.

As in other cynodonts, the postcanines bore multiple cusps, which in Prozostrodon were placed in a straight line. They consisted of a large central cusp (cusp A in the upper teeth, cusp a in the lower ones), a smaller front cusp (cusp B or b) in front of the central cusp, and a small rear cusp (cusp C or c) behind the central cusp. Cusp C/c was often followed by an even smaller cusp D/d. Some of the postcanines also bore a shelf-like feature called a cingulum parallel to the main cusps. The roots of the postcanines were incipiently divided by a groove that ran lengthwise down the root. Prozostrodon appears to have had up to ten lower postcanines. The lower postcanines can be divided into two main shapes, located in the front and back respectively. The first shape (the "simple" type) had a large cusp a and significantly smaller cusps b and c, and sometimes a small cusp d behind cusp c. In teeth of this type, the cingulum was poorly developed or absent. The second postcanine shape (the "complex" type) had a relatively smaller cusp a and larger cusps b and c. These teeth also had a well-developed cingulum on the lingual side, which could bear up to nine distinct cusps. In the holotype, the first five postcanines (pc1–5) are of the simple type, while the last four (pc7–10) are inferred to be of the complex type. A third, "transitional" type, with similar cusp proportions to the first type but with a cingulum like the second, is found in the sixth postcanine of the holotype. In the juvenile specimen CAPPA/UFSM 0123, which only preserves the fourth, fifth and sixth postcanines, the fourth tooth was of the first, simple type. Unlike the holotype, the fifth and sixth postcanines were both of the second, more complex type, more closely resembling the seventh and eighth postcanines of the holotype. This indicates that juveniles had more complex anterior postcanines than adults, and that these were replaced with simpler teeth during growth, simultaneously with the eruption of additional complex postcanines at the back of the jaws.

== Classification ==
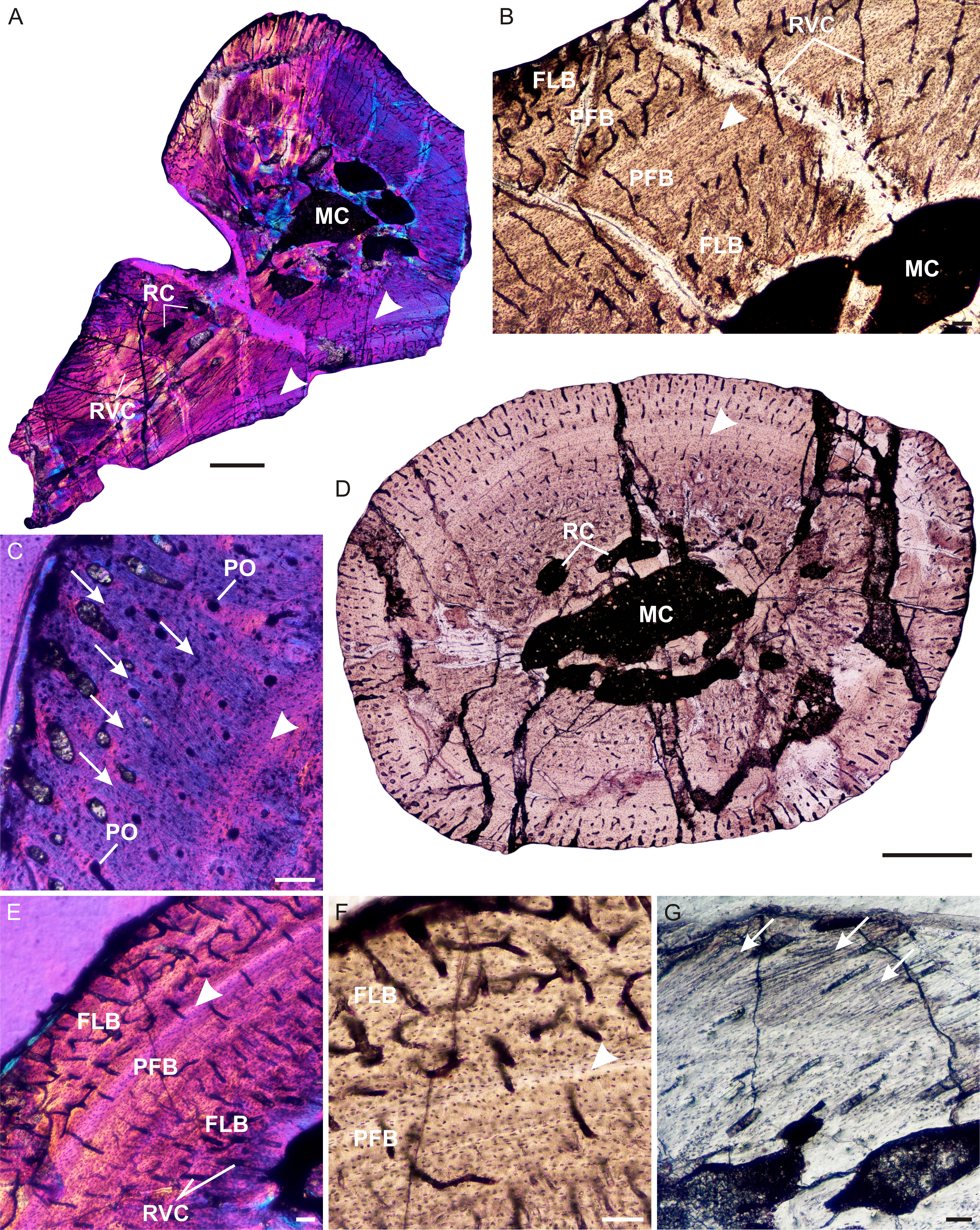
Limb bone osteohistology of the holotype

Ever since the genus was named in 2001, Prozostrodon has generally been found to be a relatively derived probainognathian, diverging after the ecteniniids, chiniquodontids and probainognathids, but before the tritheledontids, tritylodontids and more derived groups. The clade formed by Prozostrodon and Mammalia was given the name Prozostrodontia in a 2010 paper.

A 2026 phylogenetic analysis published by Michelotti and colleagues recovered Prozostrodon as the sister taxon of Pseudotherium—a prozostrodontian from the Carnian Ischigualasto Formation of Argentina—together forming the clade Prozostrodontidae. These results are displayed in the cladogram below:

- Probainognathia
  - †Lumkuia
  - - †Chiniquodontidae
    - - †Probainognathidae
      - - †Ecteniniidae
        - - †Protheriodon
          - Prozostrodontia
            - †Prozostrodontidae
              - †Prozostrodon
              - †Pseudotherium
            - - †Therioherpeton
              - - †Ictidosauria
                - Mammaliamorpha
                  - †Tritylodontidae
                  - - †Botucaraitherium
                    - †Brasilodon
                    - Mammaliaformes
