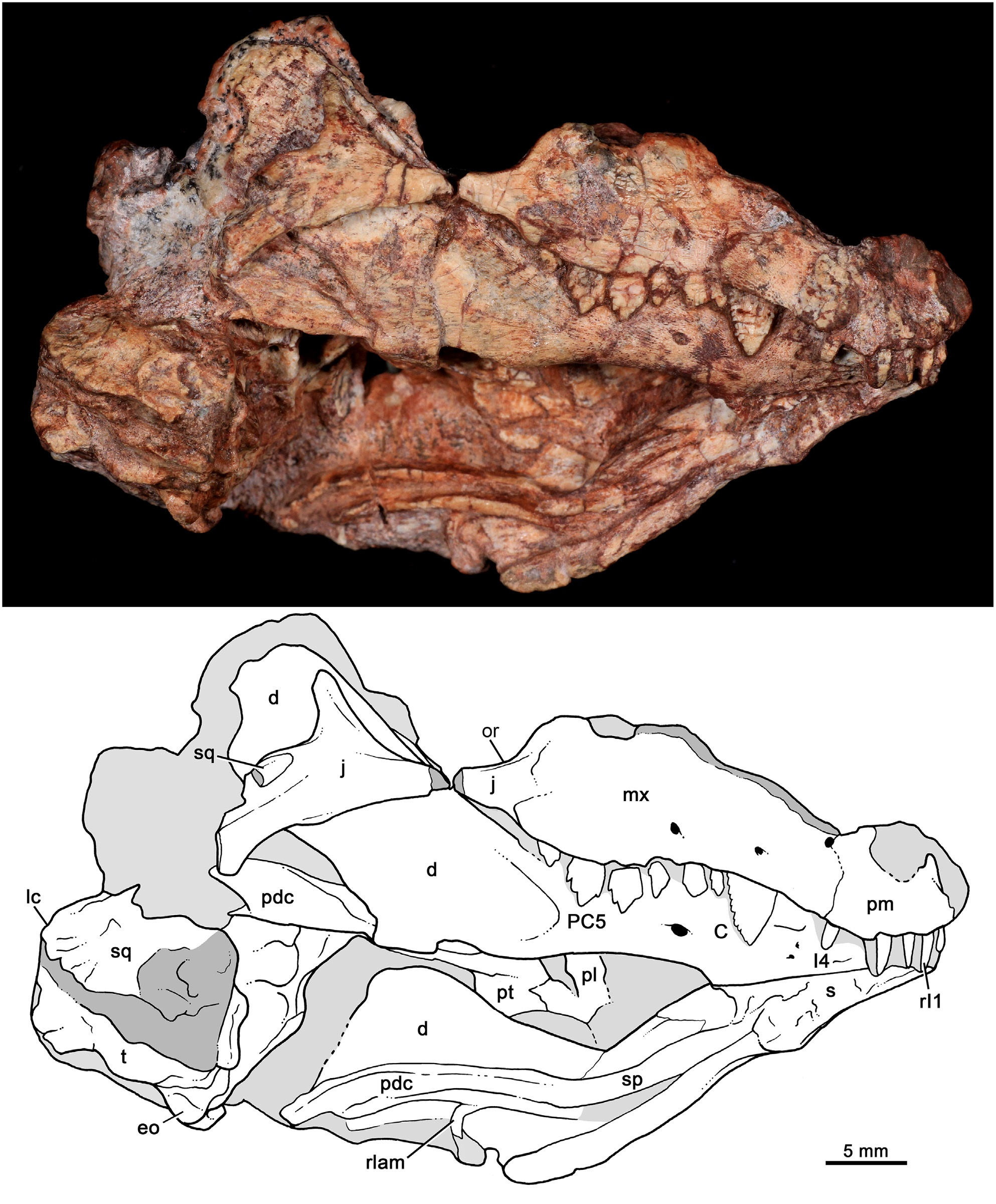
- Bonacynodon skull

Scientific classification
- Kingdom: Animalia
- Phylum: Chordata
- Clade: Synapsida
- Clade: Therapsida
- Clade: Cynodontia
- Clade: Probainognathia
- Family: †Probainognathidae; Romer, 1973

Genera
- †Bonacynodon; †Probainognathus

= Probainognathidae =

Probainognathidae Temporal range: Ladinian–Carnian

Extinct family of cynodonts

Probainognathidae is an extinct family of insectivorous cynodonts which lived in what is now South America during the Middle to Late Triassic. The family was established by Alfred Romer in 1973 and includes two genera, Probainognathus from the Chañares Formation of Argentina and Bonacynodon from the Dinodontosaurus Assemblage Zone of Brazil. Probainognathids were closely related to the clade Prozostrodontia, which includes mammals and their close relatives.

== Description ==
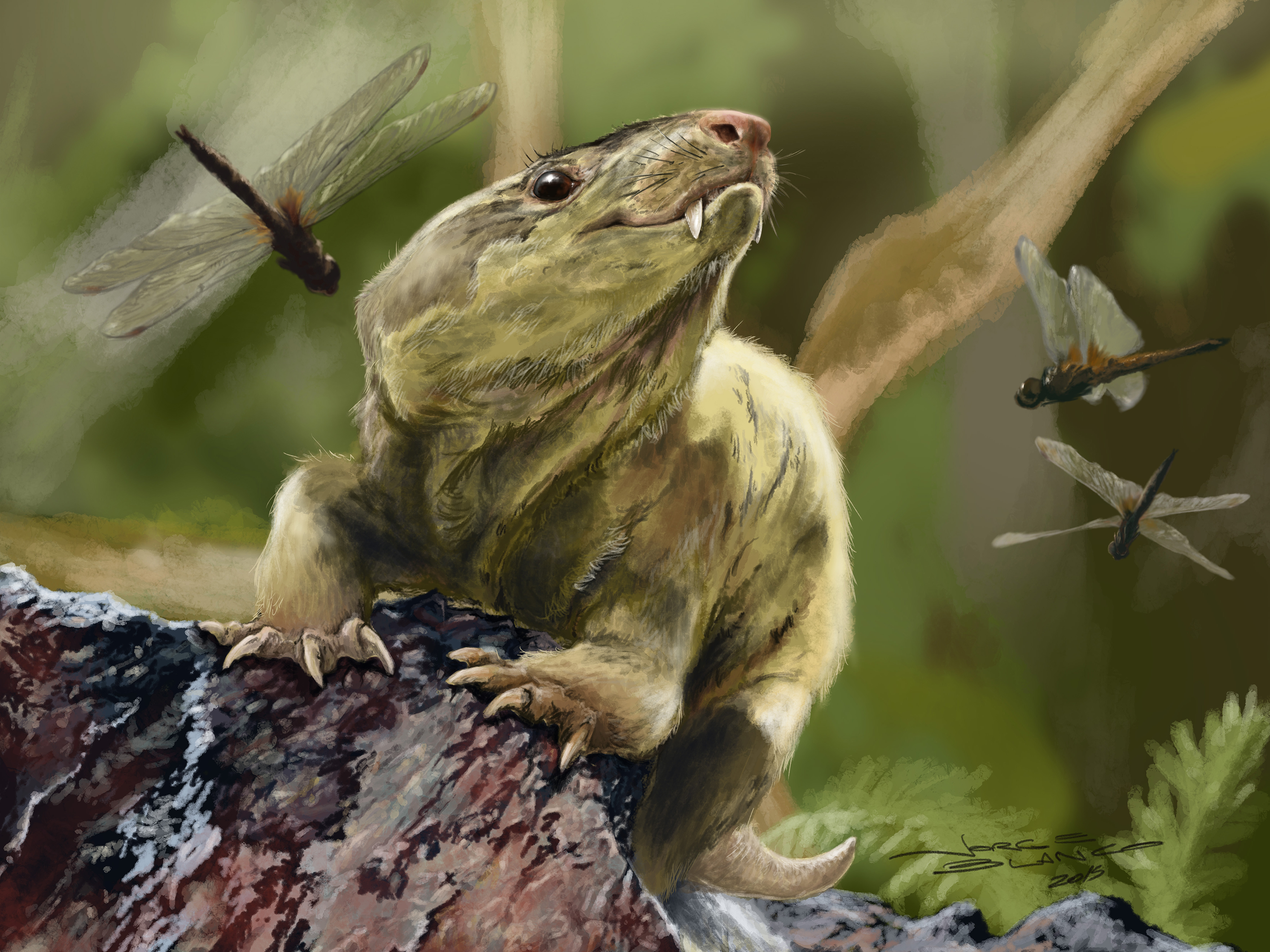
Restoration of Bonacynodon

Members of Probainognathidae were relatively small-bodied animals, with skull lengths of around 6–7 centimetres (2.4–2.8 in). The temporal region (area behind the eye sockets) was rather wide, and longer than the snout. The secondary palate was well-developed compared to earlier cynodonts, and the portion made up by the maxilla was larger than the part made from the palatine bone. The dentary, the tooth-bearing bone of the lower jaw, was quite tall when seen from the side. The mandibular symphysis (the joint between the two halves of the dentary) was fused in Probainognathus, but unfused in Bonacynodon. In addition to the ancestral quadrate-articular jaw joint found in most non-mammalian cynodonts, probainognathids also had an incipient contact between the squamosal and surangular bones. The canine teeth were large and labio-lingually compressed, and in Bonacynodon they bore a serrated edge. The postcanines had a typical "triconodont" shape, with four main cusps placed in a straight line. Unlike in other basal probainognathians like Chiniquodon, the cusps were not recurved. The lower postcanines bore a discontinuous cingulum which was restricted to the mesiolingual and distolingual sides of the teeth. The shape of the postcanines indicates that probainognathids most likely were insectivorous.

Based on the shape of the maxillary canal, a 2020 paper by Benoit et al. suggested that Probainognathus was among the first cynodonts to possess a mobile rhinarium with whiskers.

== Classification ==
Probainognathidae was erected in a 1973 paper by the American palaeontologist Alfred Romer to contain Probainognathus, a cynodont from the Carnian-aged Chañares Formation of Argentina, which Romer had removed from the family Chiniquodontidae. The family remained monotypic for a long time, until the genus Bonacynodon, from the Ladinian-early Carnian Dinodontosaurus Assemblage Zone of Brazil, was named in a 2016 paper by Martinelli et al. This paper also provided a phylogenetic definition of Probainognathidae, as "the clade including the most recent common ancestor of Probainognathus jenseni and Bonacynodon schultzi, and all its descendants".

Phylogenetic analyses have generally found probainognathids to be relatively early-diverging members of Probainognathia, a clade that includes all cynodonts closer to mammals than to Cynognathia. The exact placement of probainognathids relative to other basal probainognathians varies between analyses. Some analyses find probainognathids to be very close relatives of Prozostrodontia, a group of advanced probainognathians that includes mammals and their close relatives. Some analyses alternatively find Ecteniniidae, a group of large predatory cynodonts, to be closer to prozostrodontians than the probainognathids.

Cladogram from Martinelli et al. (2016)

- Probainognathia
  - Ecteninion
  - - Chiniquodon
    - - - Probainognathidae
          - Bonacynodon
          - Probainognathus
      - - Protheriodon
        - Prozostrodontia
          - Prozostrodon
          - - Therioherpeton
            - - Tritheledontidae
              - - Tritylodontidae
                - - Botucaraitherium
                  - - - Brasilitherium
                      - Brasilodon
                    - Mammaliaformes

Cladogram from Stefanello et al. (2023)

- Probainognathia
  - Lumkuia
  - - Chiniquodon
    - - Probainognathidae
        - Bonacynodon
        - Probainognathus
    - - Ecteniniidae
      - - Protheriodon
        - Prozostrodontia
          - Prozostrodontidae
          - - Therioherpeton
            - - Irajatherium
              - - Riograndia
                - - - Diarthrognathus
                    - Pachygenelus
                  - - Tritylodontidae
                    - - Botucaraitherium
                      - - Brasilodon
                        - Mammaliaformes
