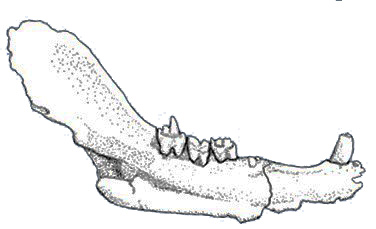
- Illustration of the holotype jaw

Scientific classification
- Kingdom: Animalia
- Phylum: Chordata
- Clade: Synapsida
- Clade: Therapsida
- Clade: Cynodontia
- Clade: Mammaliamorpha
- Genus: †Botucaraitherium; Soares et al., 2014

Type species
- †Botucaraitherium belarminoi Soares et al., 2014

= Botucaraitherium =

Botucaraitherium Temporal range: Norian ~225.42 Ma

Extinct genus of mammaliamorphs

Botucaraitherium is an extinct genus of prozostrodontian cynodonts from the early Norian Riograndia Assemblage Zone in the Candelária Formation of the Paraná Basin in southeastern Brazil. It is known from a single type species, Botucaraitherium belarminoi. The genus name is derived from the Botucaraí Hill, which dominates the landscape of Candelária, Rio Grande do Sul. The species epithet honors Belarmino Stefanello, a volunteer at the Museu Municipal Aristides Carlos Rodrigues, who found the fossil.

Botucaraitherium in a cladogram after Stefanello et al. (2023):

- Probainognathia
  - Lumkuia
  - - Chiniquodon
    - Probainognathidae
    - - Ecteniniidae
      - - Protheriodon
        - Prozostrodontia
          - Prozostrodontidae
            - Prozostrodon
            - Pseudotherium
          - - Therioherpeton
            - - Irajatherium
              - - Riograndia
                - - - Diarthrognathus
                    - Pachygenelus
                  - - Tritylodontidae
                    - - Botucaraitherium
                      - - Brasilodon
                        - Mammaliaformes
