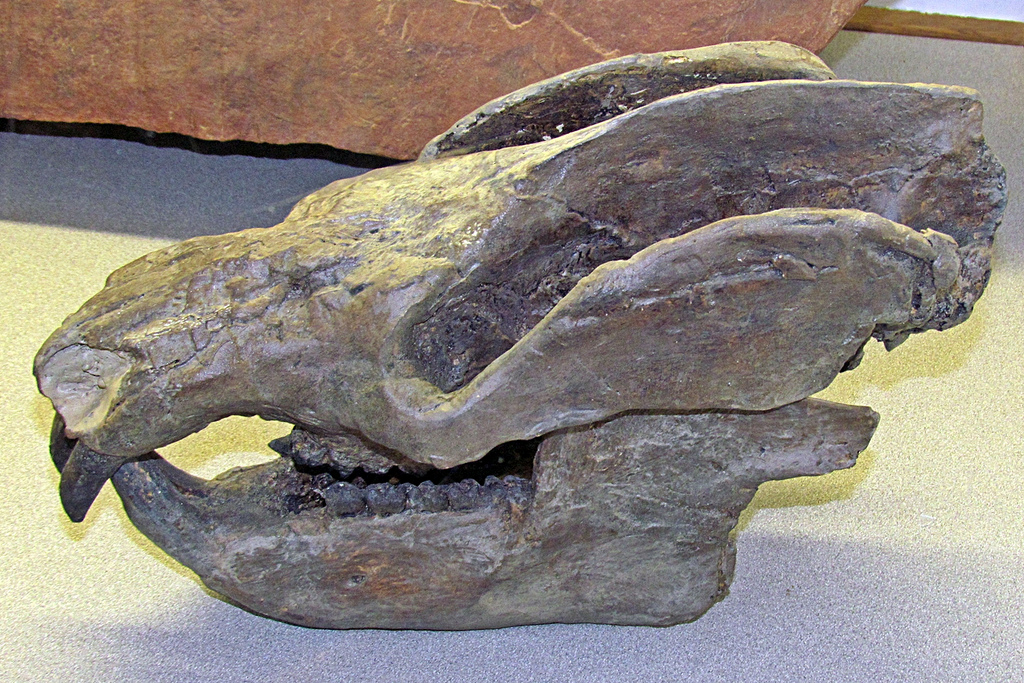
- Skull of Kayentatherium wellesi
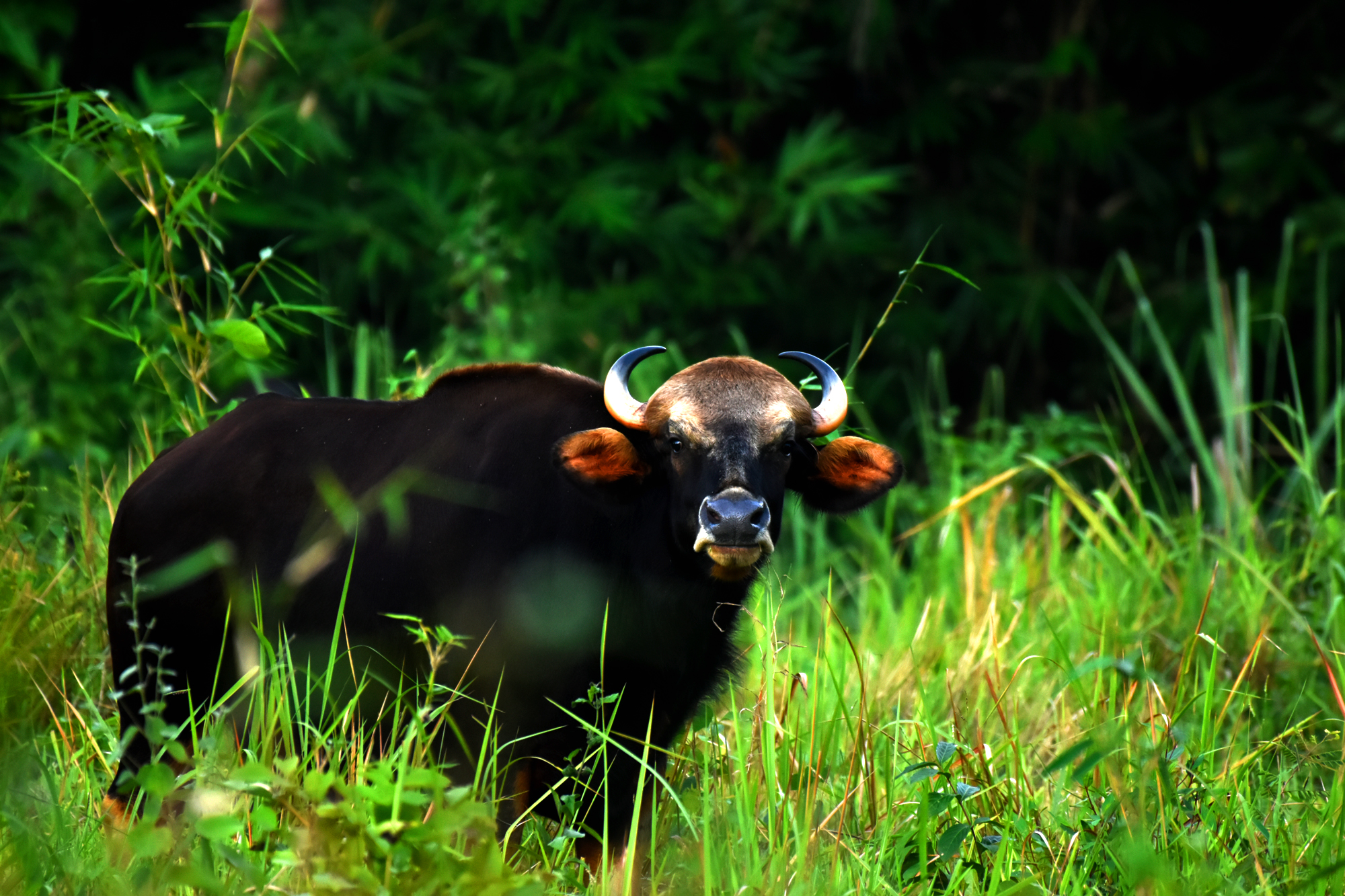
- Gaur

Scientific classification
- Kingdom: Animalia
- Phylum: Chordata
- Clade: Synapsida
- Clade: Therapsida
- Clade: Cynodontia
- Clade: Probainognathia
- Clade: Prozostrodontia; Liu and Olsen, 2010

Subgroups
- †Agudotherium?; †Alemoatherium; †Santacruzgnathus; †Therioherpeton; †Dromatheriidae; †Prozostrodontidae; †Prozostrodon; †Pseudotherium; †Tritheledontidae; Mammaliamorpha

= Prozostrodontia =

Prozostrodonts Temporal range: Late Triassic (Carnian), - Present 233.23–0 Ma

Clade of cynodonts

Prozostrodontia is a clade of cynodonts including mammaliaforms and their closest relatives such as Tritheledontidae and Tritylodontidae. It was erected as a node-based taxon by Liu and Olsen (2010) and defined as the least inclusive clade containing Prozostrodon brasiliensis, Tritylodon langaevus, Pachygenelus monus, and Mus musculus (the house mouse). Prozostrodontia is diagnosed by several characters, including:

- Reduced prefrontal and postorbital bones, with the disappearance of a strut of bone called the postorbital bar separating the eye socket from the temporal region
- Unfused symphysis between the dentary bones in the lower jaw
- The presence of a small hole within the eye socket called the sphenopalatine foramen
- A long sagittal crest extending to the rearmost part of the lambdoidal crest at the back of the skull
- Neural spines of the dorsal vertebrae angled backward
- A convex-shaped iliac crest and a reduced posterior iliac spine on the hip
- An acetabular notch on the ischium (a groove in the hip socket)
- The position of a small projection called the lesser trochanter close to the head of the femur

It has been suggested that prozostrodontians ancestrally possessed whiskers like those found in most modern mammals, based on the presence of an infraorbital canal similar in morphology to those of modern mammals.

Prozostrodontia includes tritylodontids, which have traditionally been placed within the more primitive cynodont group Cynognathia as distant mammal relatives. It also includes Tritheledontidae, which has long been placed close to mammals. Most previous studies considered Tritheledontidae a valid monophyletic grouping, meaning it was a true clade including all the descendants of a single common ancestor, but Liu and Olsen (2010) found Tritheledontidae to be a paraphyletic series of basal prozostrodontians. Below is a cladogram from Liu and Olsen (2010) showing the phylogenetic position of Prozostrodontia:

- Cynodontia
  - Procynosuchus
  - Galesaurus
  - - Thrinaxodon
    - Platycraniellus
    - Eucynodontia
      - Cynognathia
        - Cynognathus
        - Gomphodontia
          - Diademodon
          - - Langbergia
            - - Trirachodon
              - - Sinognathus
                - Traversodontidae
                  - Pascualgnathus
                  - Luangwa
                  - Scalenodon angustifrons
                  - Scalenodon hirschoni
                  - - Massetognathus
                    - Exaeretodon
      - Probainognathia
        - Ecteninion
        - - Chiniquodon
          - - Probainognathus
            - Prozostrodontia
              - Prozostrodon
              - - Therioherpeton
                - - Riograndia
                  - - Pachygenelus
                    - - Tritylodontidae
                        - Oligokyphus
                        - - Kayentatherium
                          - - Tritylodon
                            - Bienotherium
                      - - Brasilodon
                        - Mammalia
                          - Adelobasileus
                          - - Sinoconodon
                            - Morganucodon
