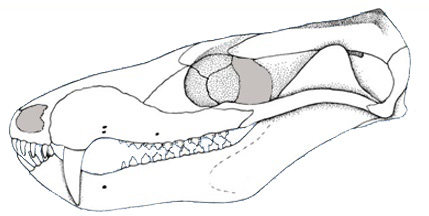
- Reconstructed skull in lateral view

Scientific classification
- Kingdom: Animalia
- Phylum: Chordata
- Clade: Synapsida
- Clade: Therapsida
- Clade: Cynodontia
- Clade: Mammaliamorpha
- Family: †Brasilodontidae; Bonaparte et al., 2005
- Genus: †Brasilodon; Bonaparte et al., 2003
- Species: †B. quadrangularis

Binomial name
- †Brasilodon quadrangularis Bonaparte et al., 2003

Synonyms
- Brasilitherium Bonaparte et al., 2003; Minicynodon Bonaparte et al., 2010

= Brasilodon =

Brasilodon Temporal range: Late Triassic ~225.42 Ma

Extinct genus of mammaliamorphs

Brasilodon ("tooth from Brazil") is an extinct genus of small, mammal-like cynodonts that lived in what is now Brazil during the Norian age of the Late Triassic epoch, about 225.42 million years ago. While no complete skeletons have been found, the length of Brasilodon has been estimated at 20 centimetres (7.9 in). Its dentition shows that it was most likely an insectivore. The genus is monotypic, containing only the species B. quadrangularis. Brasilodon belongs to the family Brasilodontidae, whose members were some of the closest relatives of mammals, the only cynodonts alive today. Two other brasilodontid genera, Brasilitherium and Minicynodon, are now considered to be junior synonyms of Brasilodon.

== Discovery and naming ==
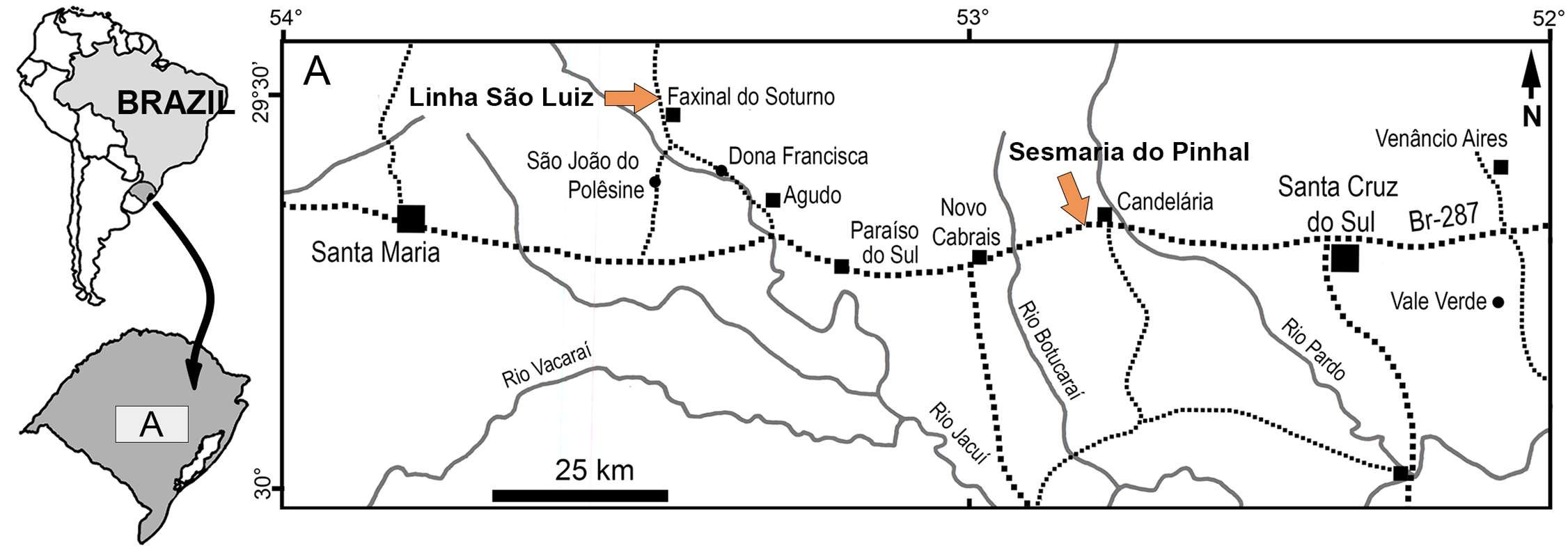
Map of part of Rio Grande do Sul, showing the two localities (Linha São Luiz and Sesmaria do Pinhal) where Brasilodon has been found

The first three specimens referred to Brasilodon quadrangularis were found at the Linha São Luiz site, a quarry near the town of Faxinal do Soturno in the state of Rio Grande do Sul. The rocks where Brasilodon was found belong to the upper part of the Candelária Sequence of the Santa Maria Supersequence, corresponding to the traditional Caturrita Formation, which has been dated to the early Norian age of the Late Triassic. The holotype (UFRGS-PV-0611-T) consists of a well-preserved skull retaining both the left and right upper postcanine teeth, but missing the lower jaw. The referred specimen UFRGS-PV-0716-T consists of the left front part of the skull, preserving 6 postcanines. The specimen UFRGS-PV-0628-T consists of a partial skull including the lower jaw, with most of the upper and lower dentition preserved. Many other specimens of Brasilodon have since been discovered, both in Faxinal do Soturno and in Candelária, and comprising both cranial and postcranial material.

The genus Brasilodon was named in a 2003 paper by José F. Bonaparte, Agustín G. Martinelli, Cesar L. Schultz and Rogerio Rubert. The generic name Brasilodon is derived from the country of Brazil where it was found, and from the Greek word odon, meaning "tooth". The intended meaning is "tooth from Brazil". The specific epithet quadrangularis refers to the rectangular shape of the upper postcanine teeth.

In the same 2003 article, the species Brasilitherium riograndensis was named, based on six specimens. Specimens attributed to Brasilitherium have been found at the same localities as Brasilodon, and have been distinguished from this taxon largely by their smaller size, different skull proportions, and by the presence of a cusp d in the lower postcanines of Brasilitherium, but not in Brasilodon. A 2005 paper erected the family Brasilodontidae for the two genera. In 2010 a third brasilodontid species, Minicynodon maieri, was named by Bonaparte et al., based on a single well-preserved skull from Faxinal do Soturno. This species was differentiated from Brasilodon by the firm attachment of the bones of the skull roof, and from Brasilitherium by the lack of a cusp b in the lower postcanines. Minicynodon was also interpreted as possessing a double jaw joint, unlike the other two species. Later studies have cast doubt on the validity of Brasilitherium and Minicynodon, proposing instead that they, along with Brasilodon, merely represent individual variation within a single species. In that case, Brasilodon is the valid taxon, whereas Brasilitherium and Minicynodon are invalid junior synonyms.

== Description ==
Brasilodon was a small, derived cynodont, with an estimated total length of around 20 centimetres (7.9 in). It exhibited many mammal-like features, including a well-developed secondary palate, symmetrical tooth development, and a more derived ear anatomy than in earlier cynodonts.

=== Skull ===
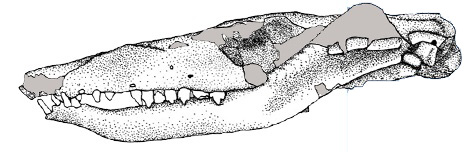
Skull of UFRGS-PV-0929-T, originally attributed to Brasilitherium

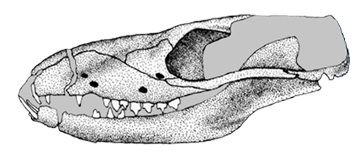
Skull of UFRGS-PV-1030-T, originally attributed to Minicynodon

Different specimens of Brasilodon had widely varying skull lengths, ranging from 20 to 55 millimetres (0.79 to 2.17 in), owing mainly to differences in age. The skull had a low, elongated shape when seen from the side. The top of the braincase was fairly wide, with a short and low parietal crest. Brasilodon lacked prefrontal and postorbital bones, which were found in more basal probainognathians like Prozostrodon. There was no postorbital bar behind the eye socket. The zygomatic arch (cheek bone) was quite low and slender.

The lower jaw consisted mainly of the dentary bone, which bore the teeth. The tip of the lower jaw was bent upwards. The symphysis, the joint between the two halves of the dentary, was unfused, with a rough surface where ligaments would have been attached. The meckelian groove was located near the lower edge of the dentary. The postdentary bones, a set of bones in the lower jaw located behind the dentary, were highly reduced compared to the condition in more primitive cynodonts. Like in most non-mammalian cynodonts, the jaw joint in Brasilodon involved the quadrate bone (a bone of the cranium, homologous to the incus of modern mammals) and the articular bone (one of the postdentary bones, homologous to the malleus). There may also have been a contact between the dentary and the squamosal bone, with the articular process of the dentary having a thickened end, apparently a precursor condition to the fully developed dentary condyle of more derived mammaliamorphs. The quadrate bone had a well-developed stapedial process, similar to that of the basal mammaliaform Morganucodon.

The front part of the roof of the mouth consisted of a well-developed secondary palate, formed by the maxillae and the palatine bones, which extended about as far back as the last postcanine. The secondary palate had a groove that the lower postcanines would have fit into when the mouth was closed. Behind the secondary palate was the primary palate, formed by the vomer and the pterygoid bones. There was a pair of gaps between the pterygoids called the interpterygoid vacuities. Well-developed interpterygoid vacuities are known in basal cynodonts like Procynosuchus, but the vacuities are generally reduced or absent in more advanced groups, so their presence in Brasilodon is likely a derived condition. The pterygoids had a transverse contact with the basipterygoid process of the basisphenoid bone. The basicranium was wide when seen from below. The prootic and opisthotic bones were fused into a petrosal bone, which had a well-defined promontorium. There were separate foramina (holes) for the maxillary and mandibular nerves. Next to the crista interfenestralis there was a large depression called the "stapedial recess", which bore several foramina. The occipital condyles were located further back than the lambdoid crest.

The cranial endocast, the interior surface of the braincase, is an important source of information about the brains of prehistoric animals, as the brains themselves are very rarely preserved in fossils. A 2013 study by Rodrigues et al. described the endocast of the specimen UFRGS-PV-1043-T, which was originally assigned to the genus Brasilitherium. The endocast had a length of 17.67 millimetres (0.696 in), which is 46.5% of the total length of this skull. The maximum width of the endocast was 7.17 millimetres (0.282 in). The shape of the endocast indicates that the animal possessed well-developed olfactory bulbs, the parts of the brain associated with the sense of smell. On the other hand, the cerebral hemispheres were smaller than in basal mammaliaforms like Morganucodon. It is unclear if Brasilodon possessed a neocortex, a part of the brain found in modern mammals. The encephalisation quotient (relative brain size) was interpreted to likely be higher than in more basal cynodonts, such as the traversodontid Massetognathus, but lower than in basal mammaliaforms and modern mammals. Like other non-mammalian cynodonts, Brasilodon likely had a lissencephalic (smooth) brain surface.

=== Dentition ===
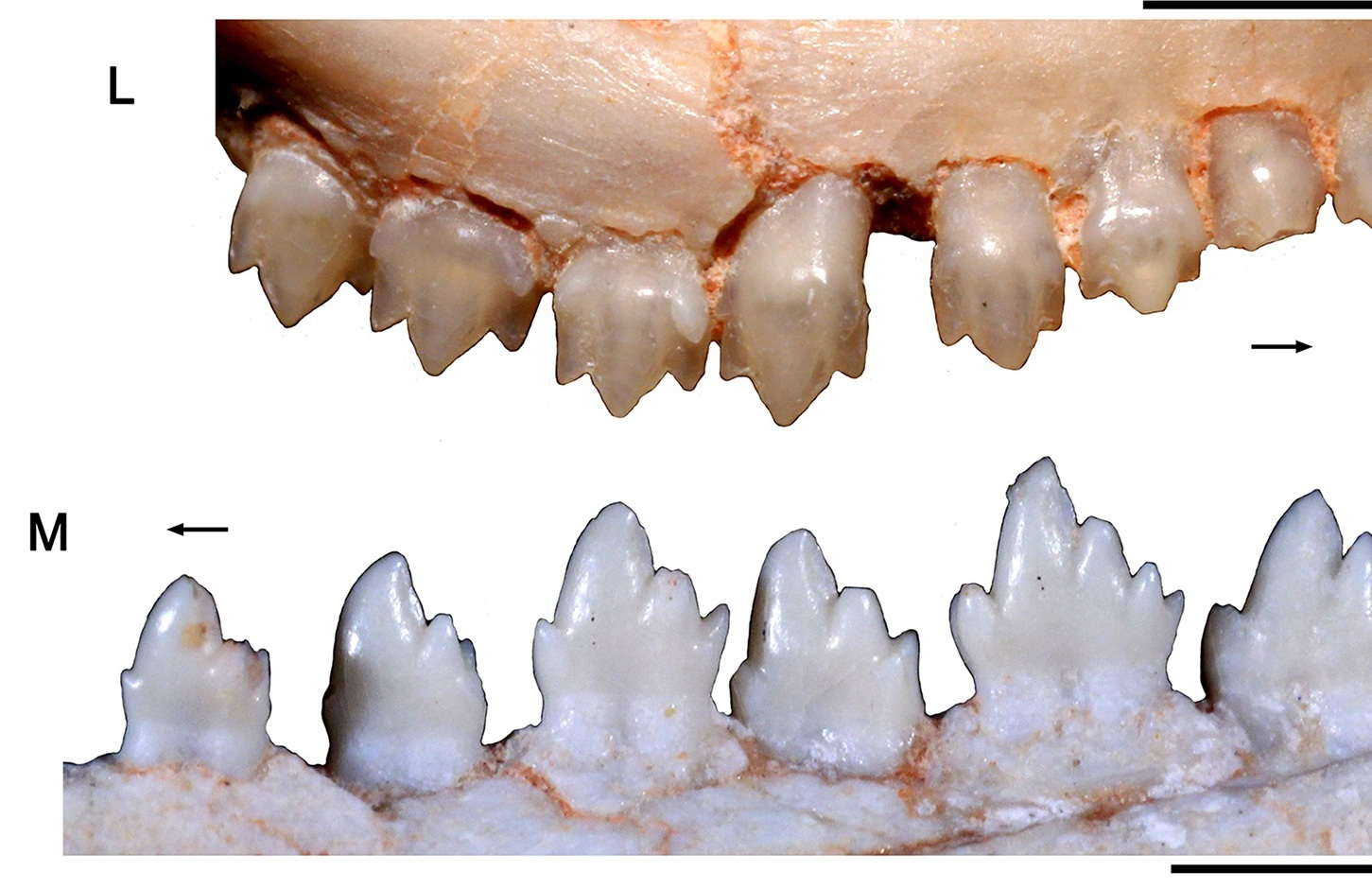
Comparison of the upper postcanines of UFRGS-PV-0611-T (L) and the lower postcanines of UFRGS-PV-0603-T, traditionally attributed to Brasilitherium (M)

Like most cynodonts, Brasilodon possessed a heterodont dentition, divided into incisors, canines and postcanines. The specimens originally assigned to Brasilodon do not preserve any of the upper incisors, but some specimens attributed to Brasilitherium bore 4 pairs of incisors in the upper jaw. There were 3 pairs of lower incisors; the first lower incisor was procumbent (forwards-pointing). In adult specimens, the canines were large and flattened from side to side, but had no serrations. In small individuals attributed to Brasilitherium, there were two pairs of functional canines, which were only slightly bigger than the incisors.

There were up to 8 pairs of postcanines in both jaws. The postcanines had a rectangular shape when looking towards the crown. There was little variation in shape in the upper postcanines, while the lower ones exhibited more variation. The upper postcanines were considerably smaller than the lower ones, a condition observed in many other probainognathians. The postcanines were "triconodont-like", with three main cusps arranged in a roughly straight line. There was a large central cusp, termed cusp A in the upper teeth and cusp a in the lower ones, a smaller cusp in front of the central cusp (cusp B/b), and another small cusp behind the central cusp (cusp C/c). In the lower postcanines of some specimens, there was an additional cusp (cusp d) behind cusp c; the absence or presence of this cusp has been used to distinguish Brasilodon from Brasilitherium, but it is likely that the lack of a cusp d in some specimens is caused by tooth wear in older individuals. The postcanines bore varying numbers of accessory cusps as well, sometimes forming a cingulum. In older specimens, there was a large gap (diastema) between the canines and postcanines, which was created by the first postcanine being shed but not replaced. There was a tongue-and-groove system in the middle lower postcanines for the interlocking between neighbouring teeth, with cusp d fitting between cusp b and the accessory cusp e, but this system was apparently not functional due to the distance between the teeth. The roots of the postcanines were not fully divided as they are in modern mammals, but they had a noticeable constriction in the middle, giving them an 8-shaped cross-section. The nutritious canals of the roots were divided too. The postcanine roots were secured to the jaw by a ring of ossified periodontal ligament.

=== Vertebrae and ribs ===
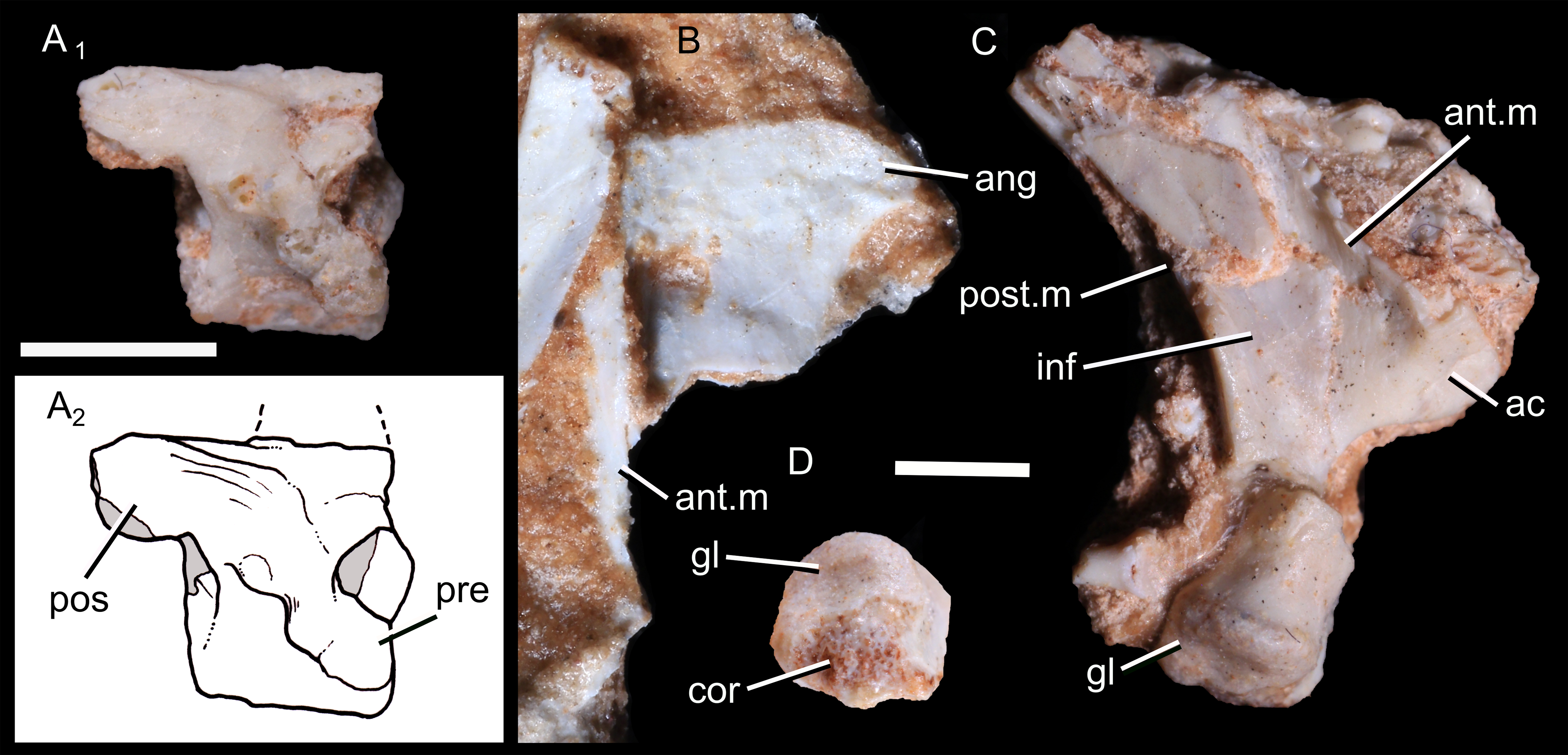
Vertebra and scapula

The vertebrae of Brasilodon are poorly known. One specimen (UFRGS-PV-1043-T) preserves 4 isolated presacral vertebrae, all of which are badly preserved. The vertebral centra were platycoelous, having a flat front end and a concave back end. Such a shape is also seen in some tritylodontids and basal mammaliaforms, but not in more basal cynodonts, which generally had amphicoelous vertebrae that were concave on both sides. The neural canal was fairly large, while the lateral walls were thin. The neural arches were fused to the centra in this specimen, showing that it was an adult. One of the vertebrae preserves a small and cylindrical diapophysis (transverse process). The zygapophyses (articular processes, four extensions of each vertebra which connect neighbouring vertebrae together) are poorly preserved, but the postzygapophyses apparently were nearly horizontal and located rather high on the vertebrae. The shape of the base of the neural spine (a pointed extension on the top surface of the vertebra) indicates that it was elongated anteroposteriorly (in a front-to-back direction).

The specimen UFRGS-PV-1043-T also preserves 4 isolated rib fragments. The ribs were flattened anteroposteriorly. Many non-probainognathian cynodonts, including most cynognathians, had wide extensions known as costal plates on their ribs; these plates are absent in most probainognathians, including Brasilodon.

=== Limbs and limb girdles ===
The lower part of a right scapula (shoulder blade) is preserved in the specimen UFRGS-PV-1043-T, with two other associated bone fragments likely representing the middle part of the dorsal (upper) margin, and the anterior (front) margin, respectively. The scapula was a thin bone, with a constricted base as in other epicynodonts. The upper margin was somewhat convex, while the posterodorsal (upper back) angle was pointed. The front and back margins had sideways-projecting flanges, as seen in other non-mammaliaform epicynodonts. There was a well-developed acromion process at the end of the front margin. The acromion was forwards-pointing as in many other cynodonts. There was a deep infraspinous fossa on the side of the scapula, but a supraspinous fossa was seemingly absent. The glenoid facet of the scapula (the area where it connected to the humerus) was concave and had a somewhat ovoid shape. The glenoid appears to have been downwards-pointing, unlike the more sideways-facing glenoids of certain early-diverging cynodonts. The coracoid and procoracoid bones have not been preserved, but there were articular surfaces for these bones on the scapula.

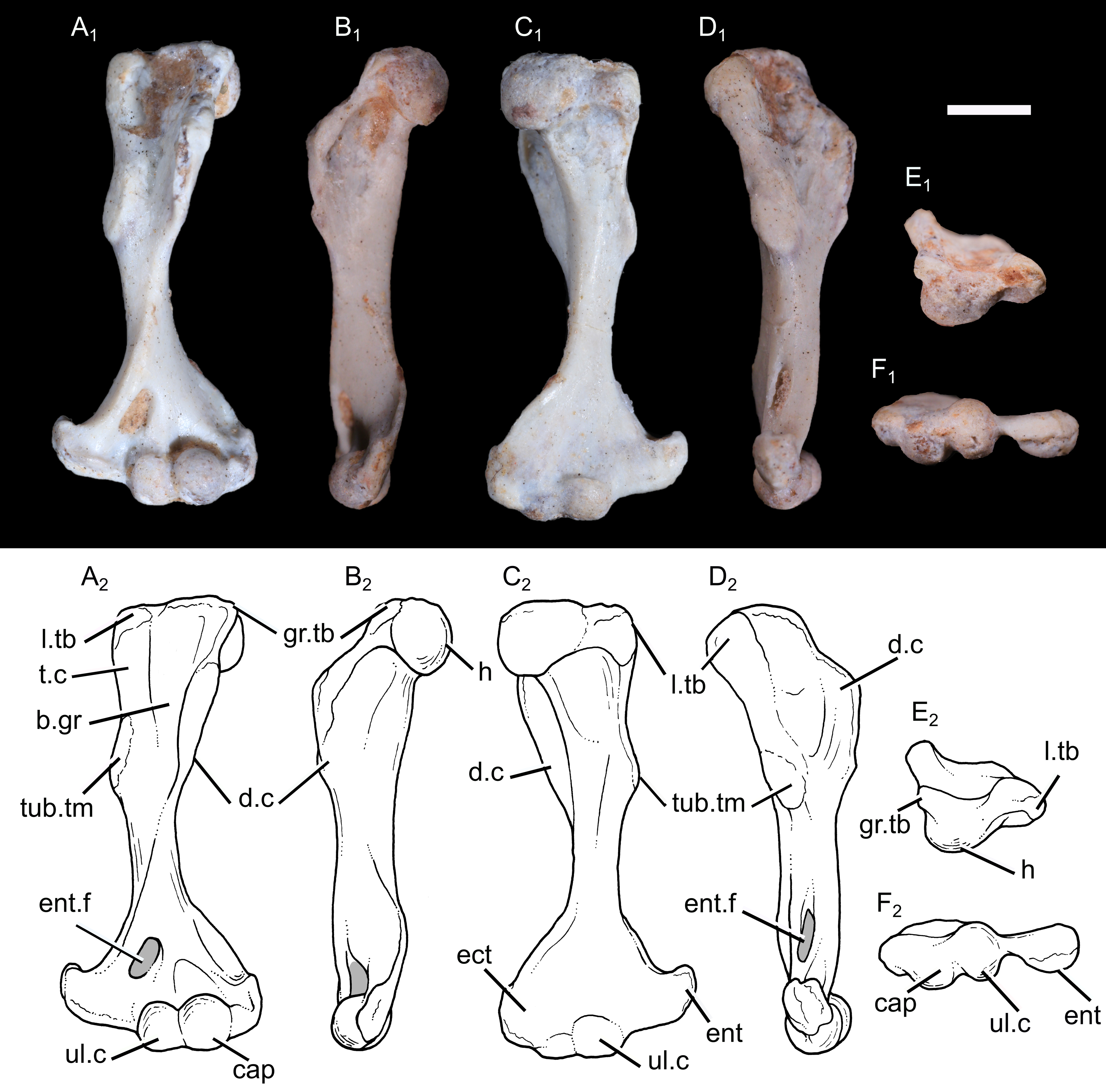
Photos and drawings of the left humerus

The specimen UFRGS-PV-1043-T preserves a complete left humerus (upper arm bone), with a length of 15.6 millimetres (0.61 in). The shaft of the humerus was slender. It was somewhat twisted, with an angulation of 15 degrees between the opposite ends of the bone. A twisted humerus is found in most cynodonts outside Theria (the clade containing modern marsupials and placentals), including in modern monotremes. However, the twisting of the humerus was relatively low in Brasilodon when compared to that of many other non-therian cynodonts. On the proximal side (the side connecting to the shoulder), the humeral head had a hemispherical shape typical of mammaliaforms, but unlike that of more basal cynodonts, where the humeral head was generally more ovoid. Unlike in most therians, the humeral head faced posterolaterally (backwards and to the side). There was a ridge extending from the humeral head to the ectepicondylar crest on the other end of the bone. Unlike more basal cynodonts, Brasilodon had a distinct greater tubercle, though it was quite small. The lesser tubercle had a thick and bulbous shape. It was larger than the greater tubercle, as in basal mammaliaforms and monotremes, but unlike in multituberculates, spalacotheriids and therians. The deltopectoral crest was confluent with the greater tubercle, and extended across 48% of the length of the humerus. The crest was quite large and robust, like in other non-mammalian cynodonts, monotremes and fossorial (burrowing) therians such as moles. On the other side of the bone, there was another crest known as the teres crest. This crest was found in most Mesozoic cynodonts, but missing in Vincelestes and therians. The teres crest was about as long as the deltopectoral crest, and extended from the lesser tubercle to a large and ovoid protrusion near the middle of the bone. This protrusion may have served as an anchor for the teres major muscle. A similar structure existed in many other Mesozoic cynodonts, but not in multituberculates, spalacotheriids or therians. On the front surface of the humerus, there was a wide bicipital groove, bordered by the deltopectoral and teres crests, similar to that of many other Mesozoic cynodonts. The bicipital groove likely served as an attachment point for the coracobrachialis muscle. The distal side of the humerus (the side connected to the radius and ulna of the forearm) had a width of 43% the length of the humerus. This was narrower than in many other non-mammalian cynodonts, as well as in monotremes, but wider than in the basal mammaliaform Morganucodon and the therian Didelphis. The entepicondyle was quite robust, and had a protrusion that pointed towards the proximal end of the bone. The ectepicondyle was more narrow and less protruding than the entepicondyle. The entepicondylar foramen was a large and elongated hole. Conversely, there was no ectepicondylar foramen; this hole was found in most cynodonts more basal than Brasilodon, but missing in tritylodontids and most mammaliaforms. The ulnar and radial condyles (the parts connecting to the ulna and radius, respectively) had a bulbous shape, as seen in other non-mammalian cynodonts. The condyles were separated by a narrow groove, and lacked the trochlear (pulley-like) shape seen in many crown-group mammals, like therians or the stem-monotreme Kryoryctes. The ulnar condyle was visible both on the front and back sides of the humerus. Its front side was somewhat transversely compressed. The radial condyle was larger than the ulnar condyle, but was not visible at the back side of the bone. The olecranon fossa (a depression on the back side of the humerus) was quite shallow, unlike the deeper fossa seen in multituberculates, Vincelestes and therians.

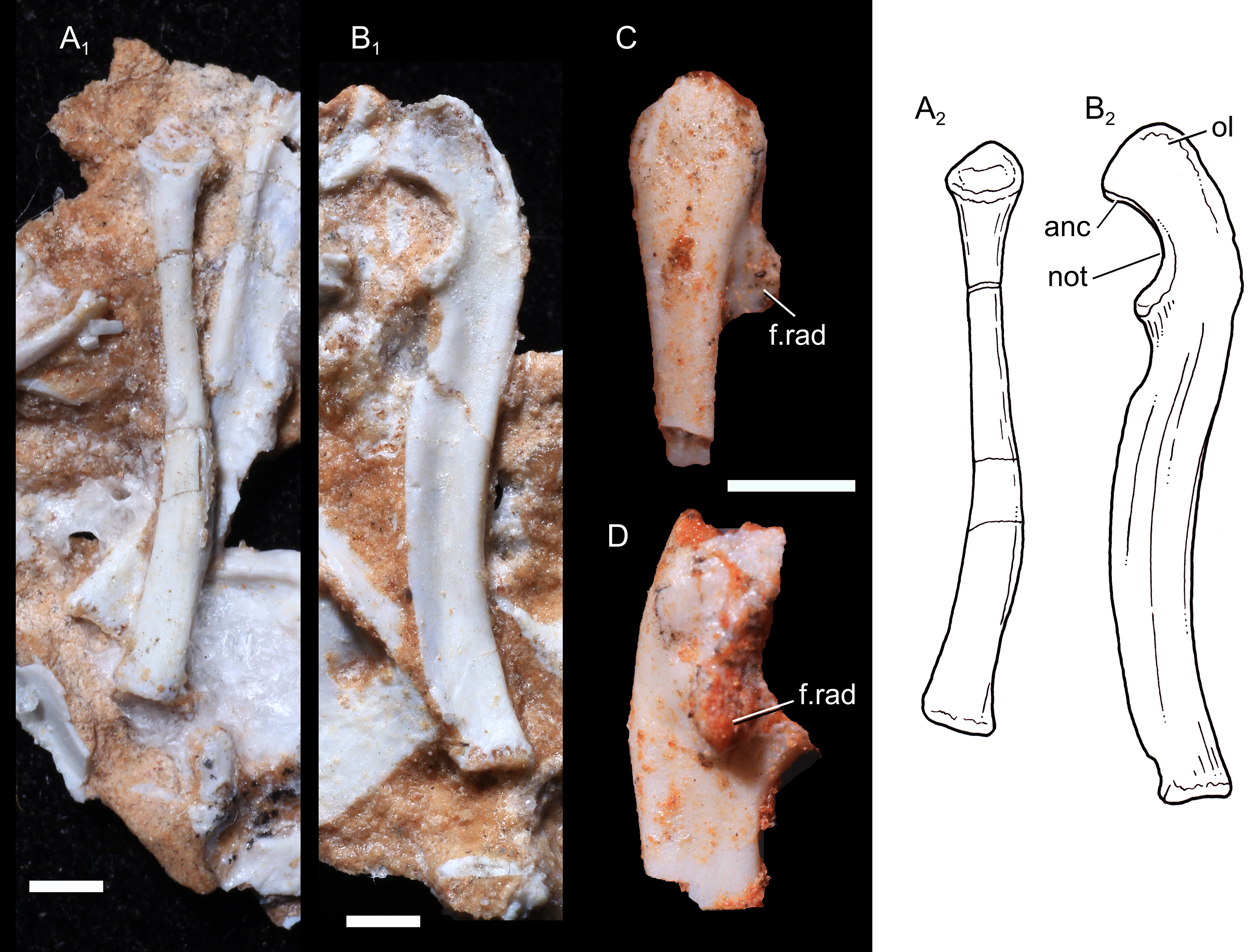
Photos and drawings of the left radius and right ulna

The left radius of UFRGS-PV-1043-T is 14 millimetres (0.55 in) long. The radius was slender, with a circular cross-section near the proximal end (closer to the elbow). The head of the radius (where it articulated with the humerus) was approximately circular, with a cup-shaped depression in the middle surrounded by a bulbous rim. The head was angled somewhat towards the anteromedial (front right) side. On the posteromedial (back right) side of the head, there was a small articular facet where it would have articulated with the radial notch of the ulna. There was no radial tuberosity for the attachment of the biceps muscle. The distal end of the bone (closer to the wrist) was shaped like a flattened rectangle. The distal end was somewhat curved posteromedially, which would have allowed the bone to cross over the front of the ulna, as in tritylodontids, Morganucodon and opossums. The distal articular surface (where it connected to the wrist) also had a rectangular shape.

The right ulna of UFRGS-PV-1043-T has a length of 16.5 millimetres (0.65 in). As in most cynodonts, the ulna was narrow mediolaterally (from side to side), and had a sigmoid (s-like) shape. On the sides of the bone, there were two grooves running from one end of the bone to the other, enclosed by thickened edges on the front and back sides. The grooves are thought to have served as attachment points for extensor and flexor muscles. On the proximal end of the bone, there was a well-developed and ossified olecranon process. With the exception of Trucidocynodon and tritylodontids, no cynodonts more basal than Brasilodon are known to have had an ossified olecranon, and it is thought to have been cartilaginous in those taxa. The olecranon of Brasilodon made up a bit less than 20% of the length of the ulna, and was directed forwards relative to the rest of the bone. The olecranon was somewhat thicker from side to side than the rest of the bone. The semilunar notch, where the ulna articulated with the ulnar condyle of the humerus, was large and semicircular. The anconeal process was quite small, like in more basal cynodonts and the docodont mammaliaform Haldanodon, but unlike in many other mammaliaforms, where the anconeal process forms a prominent crest.

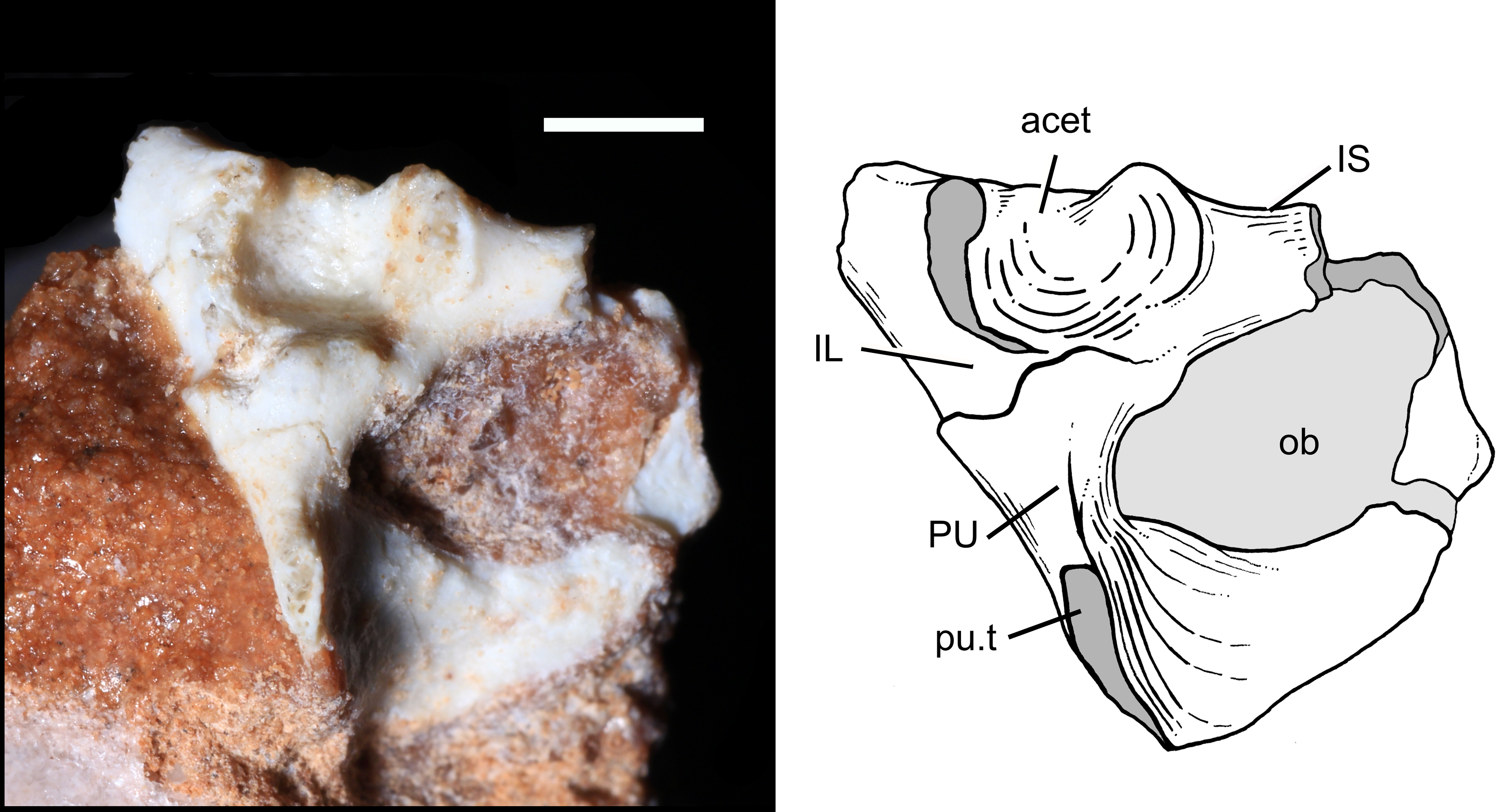
Photo and drawing of the pelvis

The pelvis (hip bone) of UFRGS-PV-1043-T preserves a complete left acetabulum and pubis, and an incomplete left ilium and ischium. The acetabulum is where the femur of the hindlimb articulates with the pelvis. The acetabulum of Brasilodon was a deep, spherical and sideways-facing depression. The three bones making up the acetabulum (pubis, ilium and ischium) were fused together, with no sutures being visible; this is a feature that Brasilodon shared with mammaliaforms, while the bones were more distinct in some more basal cynodonts such as traversodontids. The bones formed three distinct crests known as supraacetabular buttresses around the acetabulum. The buttresses were separated by gaps of 2–3 millimetres (0.079–0.118 in), unlike in modern therians, where there is a fully ossified rim around the acetabulum. The gaps would likely have been filled by fibrocartilage in the living animal. The blade of the ilium is badly preserved, but the shape of the base indicates that the postacebular (backwards-pointing) part of the blade was either reduced or absent in Brasilodon, much like in other prozostrodontians. The pubic tuberosity was located below the acetabulum as in most probainognathians, including modern therians. In basal epicynodonts, monotremes and the spalacotheriid Akidolestes, the pubic tuberosity was located in front of the acetabulum instead. The pubis and ischium formed a large and ovoid obturator foramen.

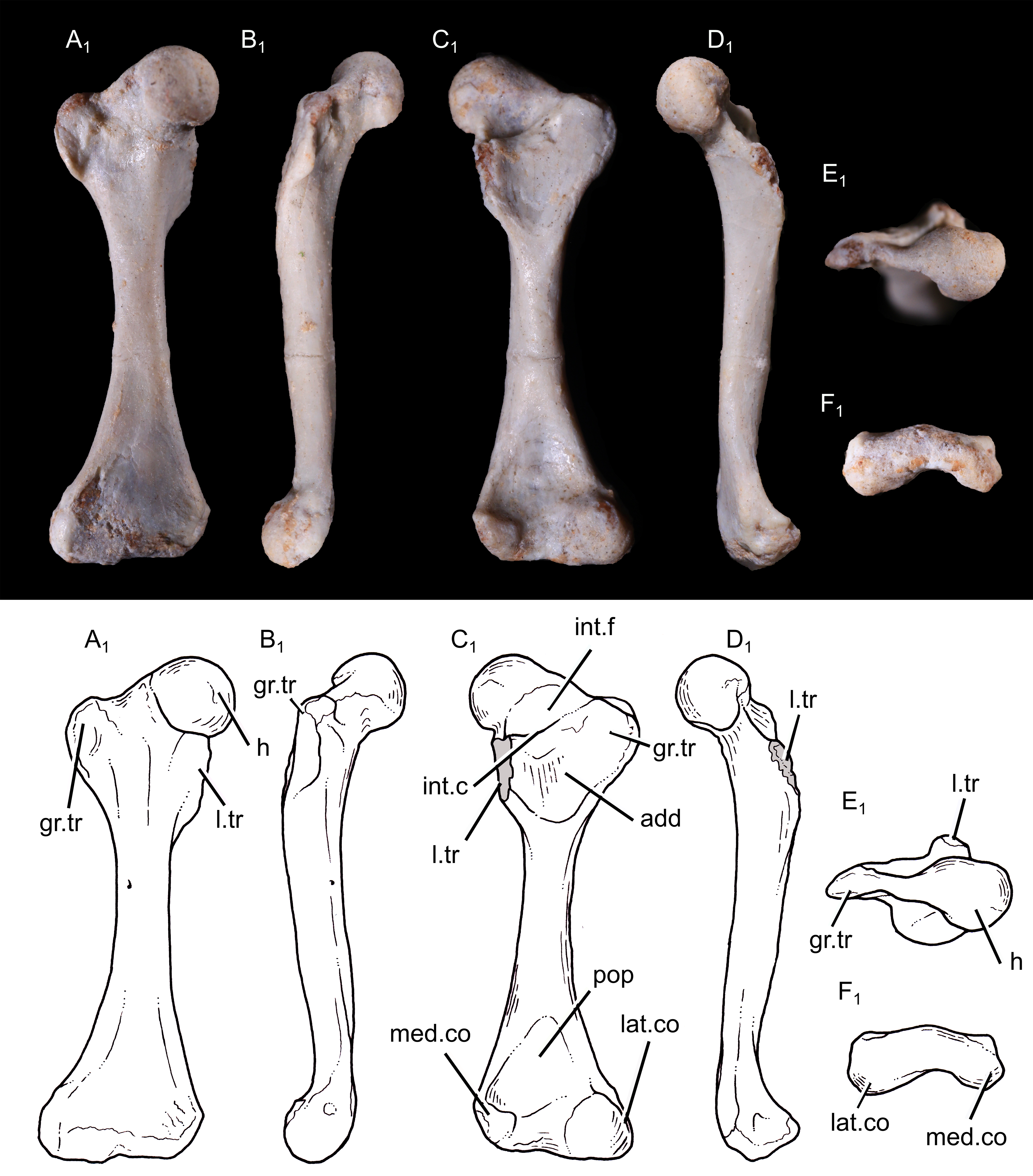
Photos and drawings of the right femur

The right femur (thigh bone) of UFRGS-PV-1043-T is 15.9 millimetres (0.63 in) long. The shaft of the femur was mostly straight, but with a prominent forward bend close to the hip joint, as in other non-mammalian cynodonts; in modern mammals, this bend is less well-developed. The proximal part of the shaft (closer to the hip) was mostly square-shaped, but it became more compressed from front to back more distally (towards the knee), while simultaneously becoming wider from side to side. The proximal and distal ends of the bone had the same width. On the proximal end of the bone, the femoral head (which articulated with the acetabulum of the hip) had a hemispherical shape. The head was separated from the rest of the bone by a short femoral neck, as in tritylodontids and mammaliaforms; more primitive cynodonts lacked a femoral neck. The head was angled around 60 degrees medially (to the right) compared to the longitudinal axis of the femur, resembling the condition in multituberculates and spalacotheriids. Unlike in mammaliaforms, there was no fovea capitis on the femoral head. Slightly distally to the femoral head, there was a well-developed projection known as the greater trochanter on the left side of the bone. A distinct greater trochanter is also found in tritylodontids and mammaliaforms, but the greater trochanter was confluent with the femoral head in more basal cynodonts. On the right side of the bone, there was a short crest called the lesser trochanter. The lesser trochanter pointed to the right, and was visible on the front side of the bone, as in many other probainognathians. In more basal cynodonts, it generally was more backwards-pointing, and not visible on the front side. The lesser trochanter did not extend as far towards the proximal end of the bone as in basal mammaliaforms. There was no third trochanter. On the back side of the femur, between the greater and lesser trochanters, there was a deep and narrow depression called the intertrochanteric fossa. On the distal edge of this fossa, there was an intertrochanteric crest which connected the two trochanters. This crest is also found in most therians, but was missing in most Mesozoic cynodont groups. There was a relatively shallow, triangular depression located distally to the intertrochanteric crest; this probably served as an attachment point for the hip adductor muscles. On the back side of the distal end of the femur, there were two condyles that would have connected to the tibia, the medial and lateral condyles. The medial condyle was compressed from side to side. The popliteal fossa had a triangular shape and was located close to the condyles.

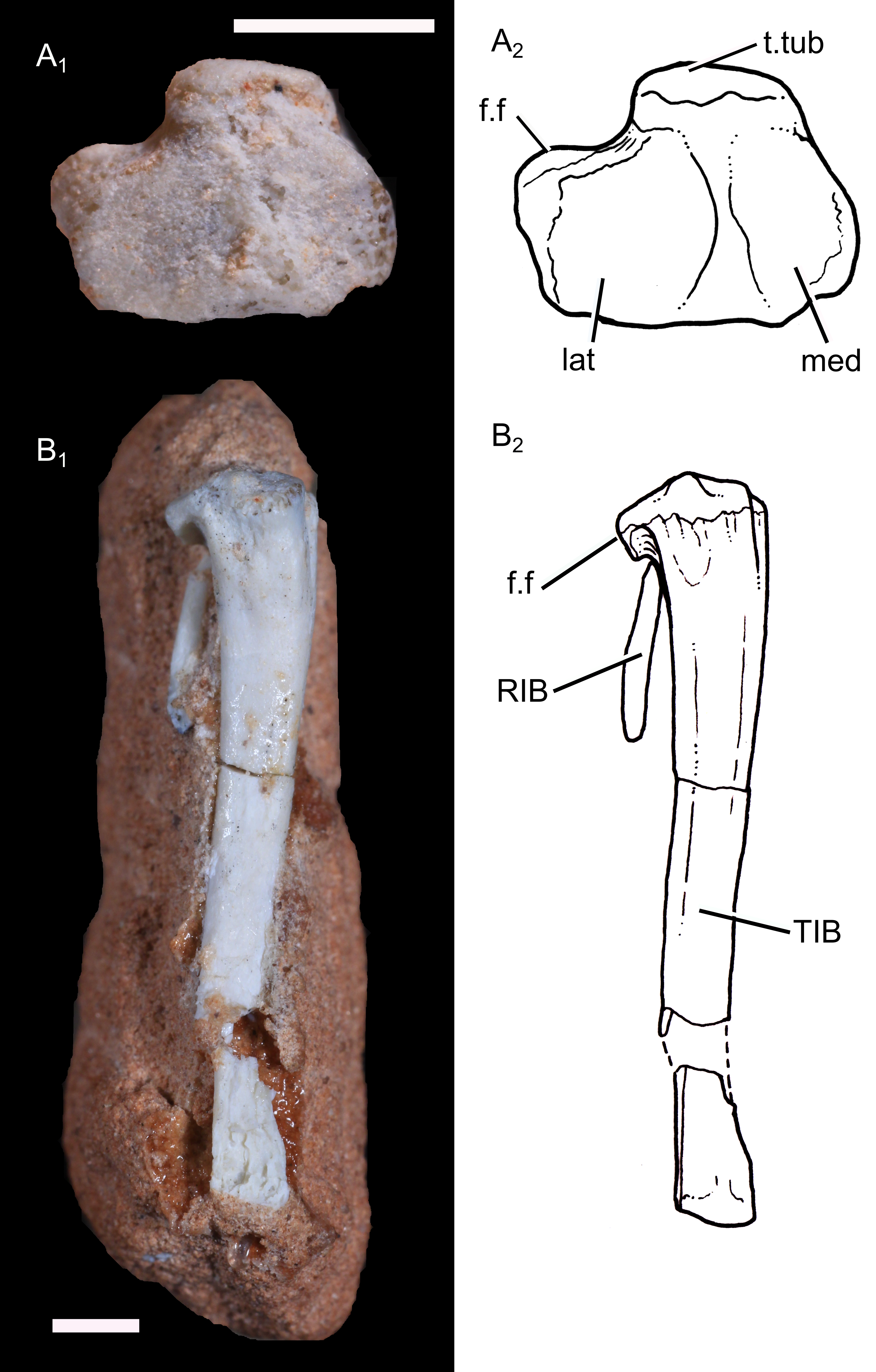
Photo and drawing of the tibia

UFRGS-PV-1043-T preserves a nearly complete left tibia (shin bone). It was a slender bone, with the preserved parts having a length of 16.1 millimetres (0.63 in). The shaft was mostly straight, but with a slight medial (rightwards) curve in the proximal part (towards the knee); more basal cynodonts generally had a stronger medial curve of the tibia. The shaft became progressively more flattened towards the distal end (towards the ankle). On the proximal part, there were two articular facets, the medial and lateral facets, which articulated with the condyles of the femur. The lateral facet was wider than the medial one. The distal end of the tibia has not been preserved.

UFRGS-PV-1043-T preserves two left tarsal bones, the calcaneum and astragalus. The calcaneum (heel bone) of Brasilodon had a low and broad shape, unlike the narrow calcaneum found in multituberculates, the "symmetrodont" Zhangheotherium and therians. It had a convex upper surface and a concave lower surface. There was a well-developed tuber calcis on the back end of the bone; this feature is found in most eucynodonts, but is missing in more basal taxa like Thrinaxodon. There was a peroneal shelf on the lateral (left) side of the calcaneum. On the medial (right) side, there was a projection known as the sustentaculum tali, which would have connected to the underside of the astragalus (ankle bone). In basal cynodonts like Thrinaxodon, no sustentaculum tali has been found, suggesting that it was cartilaginous, if it even existed in those taxa. The left astragalus was smaller than the calcaneum. It had a hemispherical dorsomedial (top right) surface and a flat lateroplantar (bottom left) surface. The front end of the astragalus had a small head. The neck that separated the head from the rest of the bone was shorter than in modern therians.

UFRGS-PV-1043-T also preserves two incomplete metatarsals, comprising a proximal and a distal end, which would have connected to the tarsals and to the phalanges, respectively. The proximal end bore a circular depression, while distal end had two symmetrical condyles. A possible metapod (metatarsal or metacarpal) fragment is also known from the specimen UFRGS-PV-0765-T, which had a broad proximal part and a more narrow shaft. Both of these specimens also preserve some phalanges (finger bones), with UFRGS-PV-0765-T preserving a nearly complete middle phalange. This phalange was rather short, with a concave proximal end and two small condyles on the distal end.

== Classification ==
The genus Brasilodon belongs to Brasilodontidae, a family of advanced probainognathian cynodonts. Along with Brasilodon, two contemporary genera (Brasilitherium and Minicynodon) have been assigned to the family, both of which are likely to be synonyms of Brasilodon. Protheriodon, a genus from the Middle Triassic (Ladinian) of Brazil, and Panchetocynodon, a poorly known cynodont from the Early Triassic (Induan) of India, were also placed in Brasilodontidae in a 2013 paper by José Bonaparte. However, Protheriodon has more recently been found to be an early-diverging probainognathian unrelated to brasilodontids, while Panchetocynodon is otherwise treated as an incertae sedis taxon, whose relationships to other taxa are unclear, due to its incompleteness.

Features of the skull and dentition of Brasilodon indicate that it was a derived cynodont closely related to mammals, the only extant cynodonts. Phylogenetic analyses have commonly recovered it as a member of the clade Mammaliamorpha, lying closer to mammals than the tritylodontids, but outside Mammaliaformes, a more exclusive clade containing mammals and their closest relatives, such as morganucodonts, docodonts and haramiyidans. The cladogram below is adapted from a 2019 analysis by Wallace et al.:

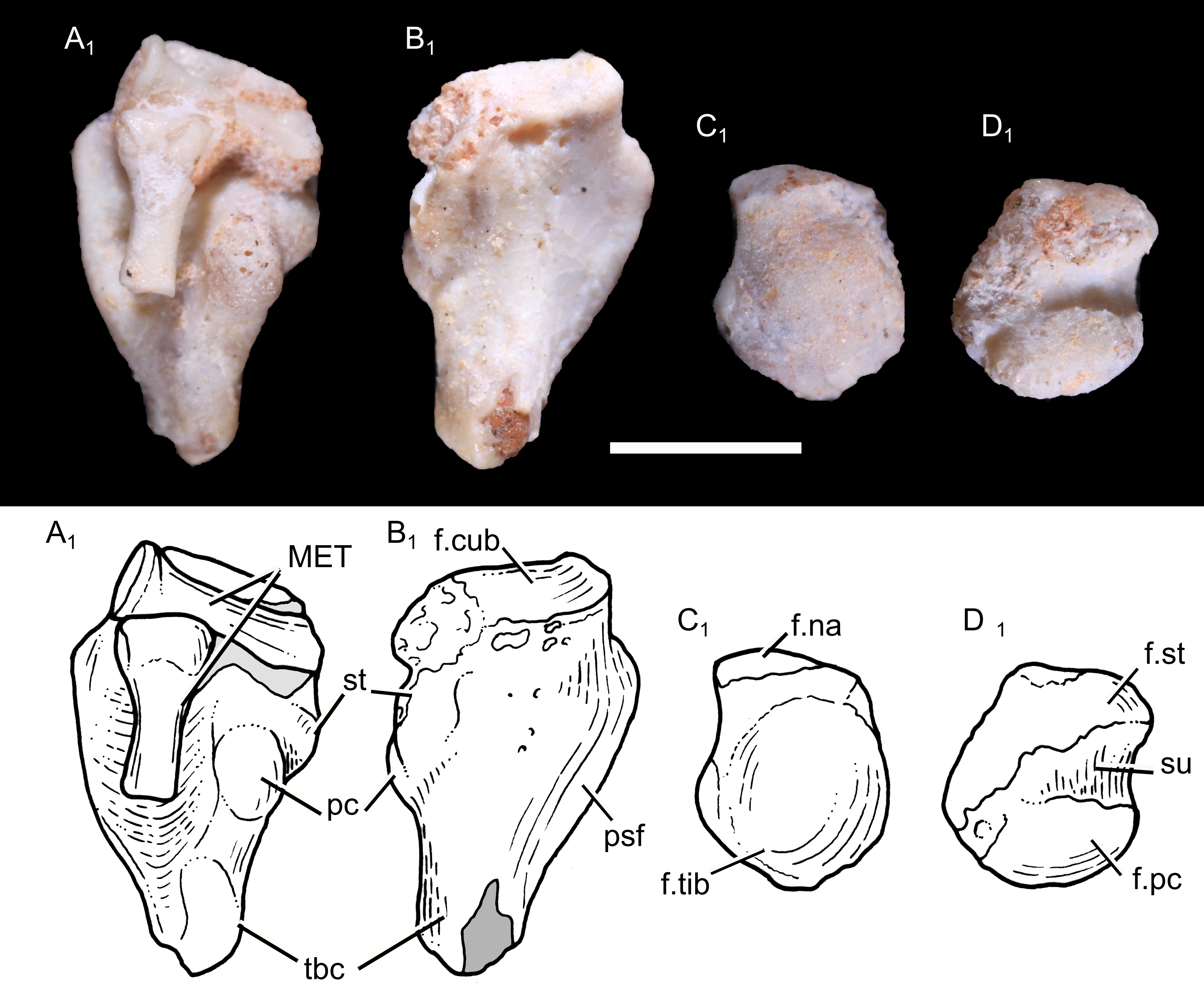
Photos and drawings of the calcaneum and astragalus

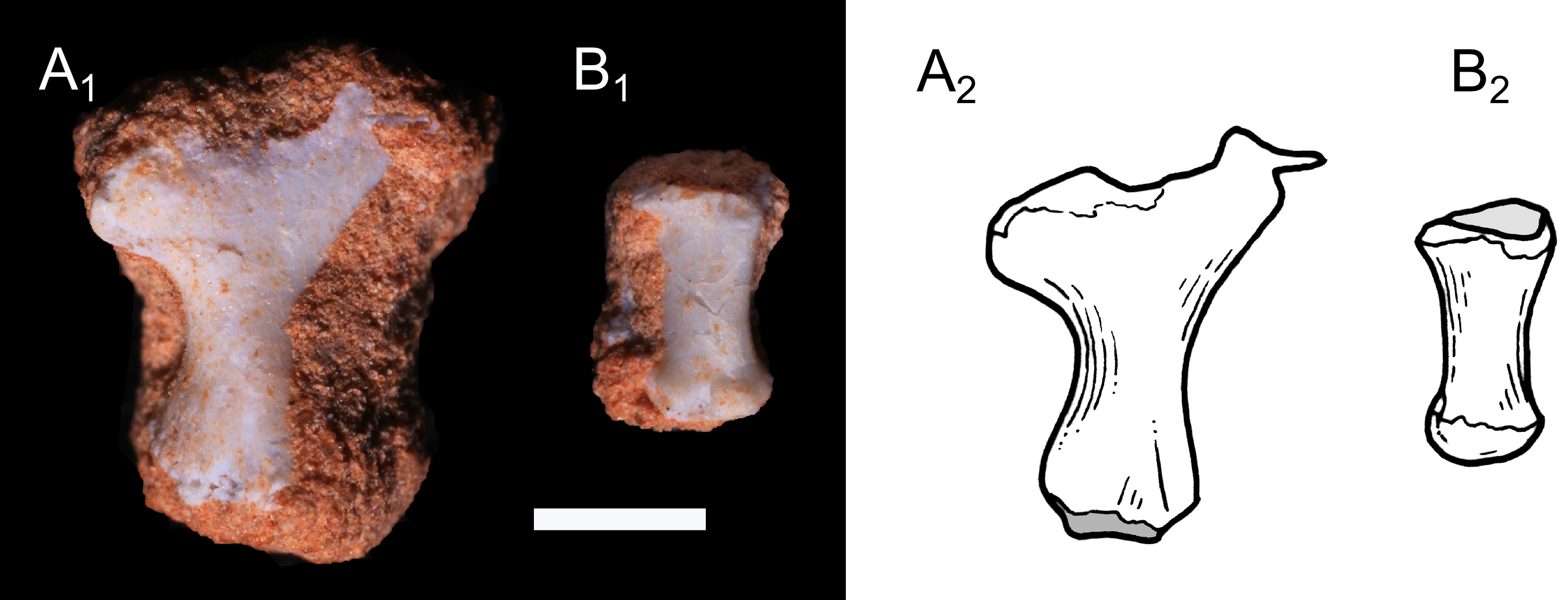
Photos and drawings of a metapod and phalange

- Probainognathia
  - Probainognathus
  - - Prozostrodon
    - - Therioherpeton
      - - Tritheledontidae
          - Pachygenelus
          - Riograndia
        - Mammaliamorpha
          - - Pseudotherium
            - Tritylodontidae
              - Oligokyphus
              - - Kayentatherium
                - - Bienotherium
                  - Tritylodon
          - - Botucaraitherium
            - - Brasilodontidae
                - Brasilitherium
                - Brasilodon
              - - Sinoconodon
                - Mammaliaformes
                  - Morganucodon
                  - Mammalia

== Palaeobiology ==
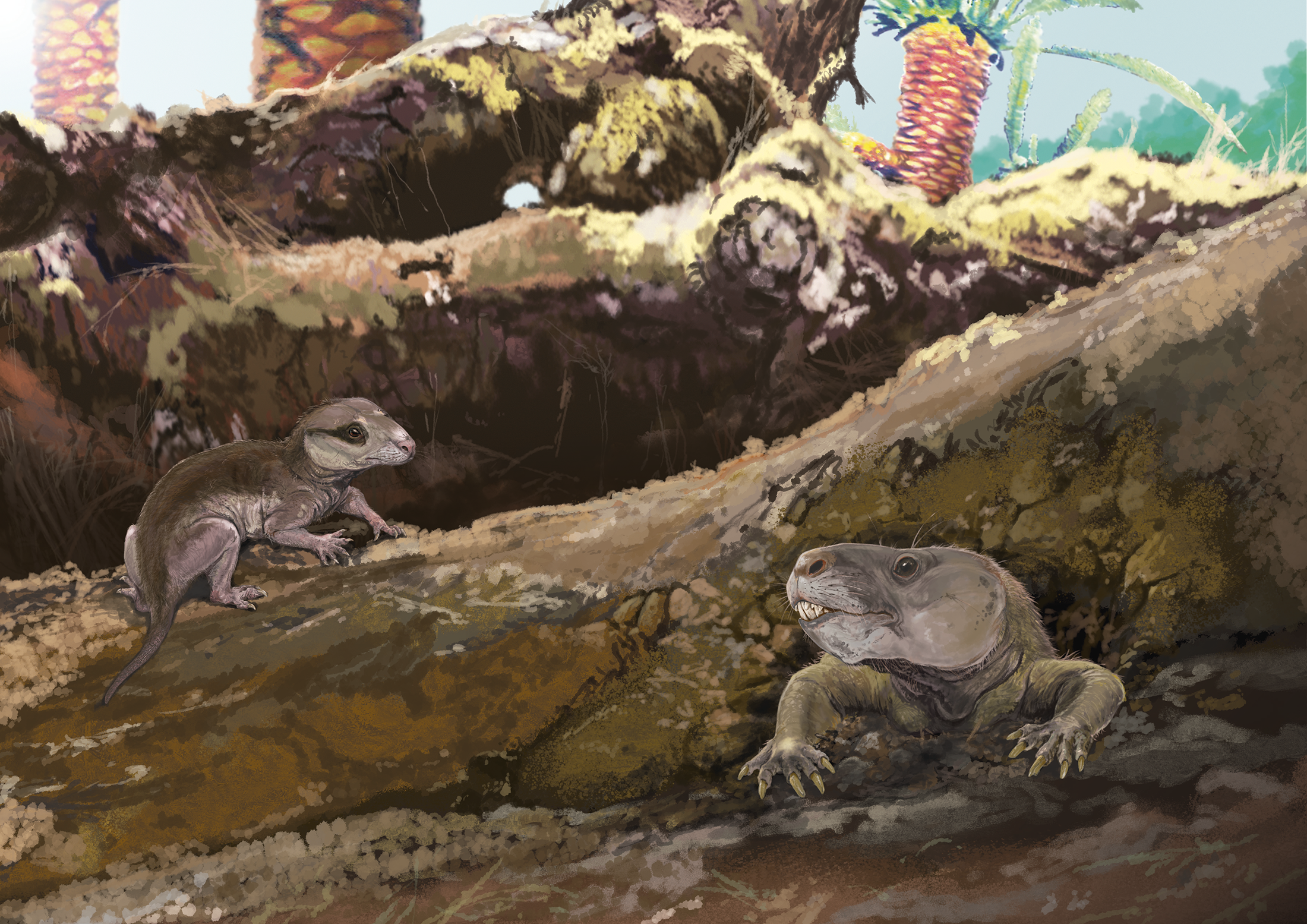
Restoration of Brasilodon (left) and Riograndia (right)

=== Locomotion ===
Features of the postcranium indicate that Brasilodon was a generalised animal capable of diverse modes of locomotion, including digging and climbing. The large tuberosity near the deltopectoral crest of the humerus implies that the teres major muscle (an important retractor muscle of the forelimb) was quite large, as seen in modern fossorial rodents. The digging adaptations of Brasilodon were however less pronounced than in modern fossorial mammals, as well as many other non-mammalian cynodonts. Evidence for scansorial (climbing) abilities includes the hemispherical humeral and femoral heads, which would have allowed a wide range of rotation of the shoulder and hip joints, the well-developed ectepicondylar crest, the hemispherical capitulum and nearly circular radial head, which would have conferred high mobility to the elbow, and the small anconeal process of the ulna. Several features of the humerus, including the twisted shaft, indicate that Brasilodon had sprawling or semi-sprawling forelimbs. On the other hand, features of the pelvis and hindlimbs, such as the poorly developed postacetabular portion of the iliac blade, indicate a more erect (parasagittal) posture of the hindlimbs.

=== Tooth replacement ===
According to one theory, outlined in detail in a 2010 paper by Martinelli et al., Brasilodon had a polyphyodont tooth replacement, where the teeth were replaced more than once throughout the animal's lifetime, though it is unclear how many successive postcanine replacements there were in Brasilodon. The postcanine replacement ceased long before the death of an individual, allowing extremely strong wear to develop in the teeth in older individuals. In some cases, the individual's teeth wore down over time to less than half the height of the crown still remaining. The size of the postcanine diastema indicates that the front postcanines may have been lost faster than in the primitive cynodont Thrinaxodon.

According to Martinelli et al. (2010), the postcanines were replaced in an alternating manner. The postcanine replacement would have occurred from the back to the front, like in several other non-mammaliaform probainognathians, and would thus have differed from that of early mammaliaforms, where the postcanines were replaced from the front towards the back. This may have been due to the unlimited skull growth of early probainognathians. Tooth replacement variation can perhaps also be attributed to diet, with the herbivorous/omnivorous traversodontids having widened postcanines and a sequential tooth replacement, and carnivorous and insectivorous non-mammaliaform probainognathians like Brasilodon having an alternating tooth replacement instead.

A 2022 study by Cabreira et al. suggests that Brasilodon actually was diphyodont, replacing its teeth only once, like most modern mammals. According to this theory, the postcanines in Brasilodon consisted of a set of deciduous teeth, which were replaced, and a set of permanent teeth divided into premolars and molars. The study suggests that the deciduous postcanines in Brasilodon erupted sequentially in a back-to-front direction, while the molars were added in the opposite direction, from the front to the back.

== Palaeoecology ==
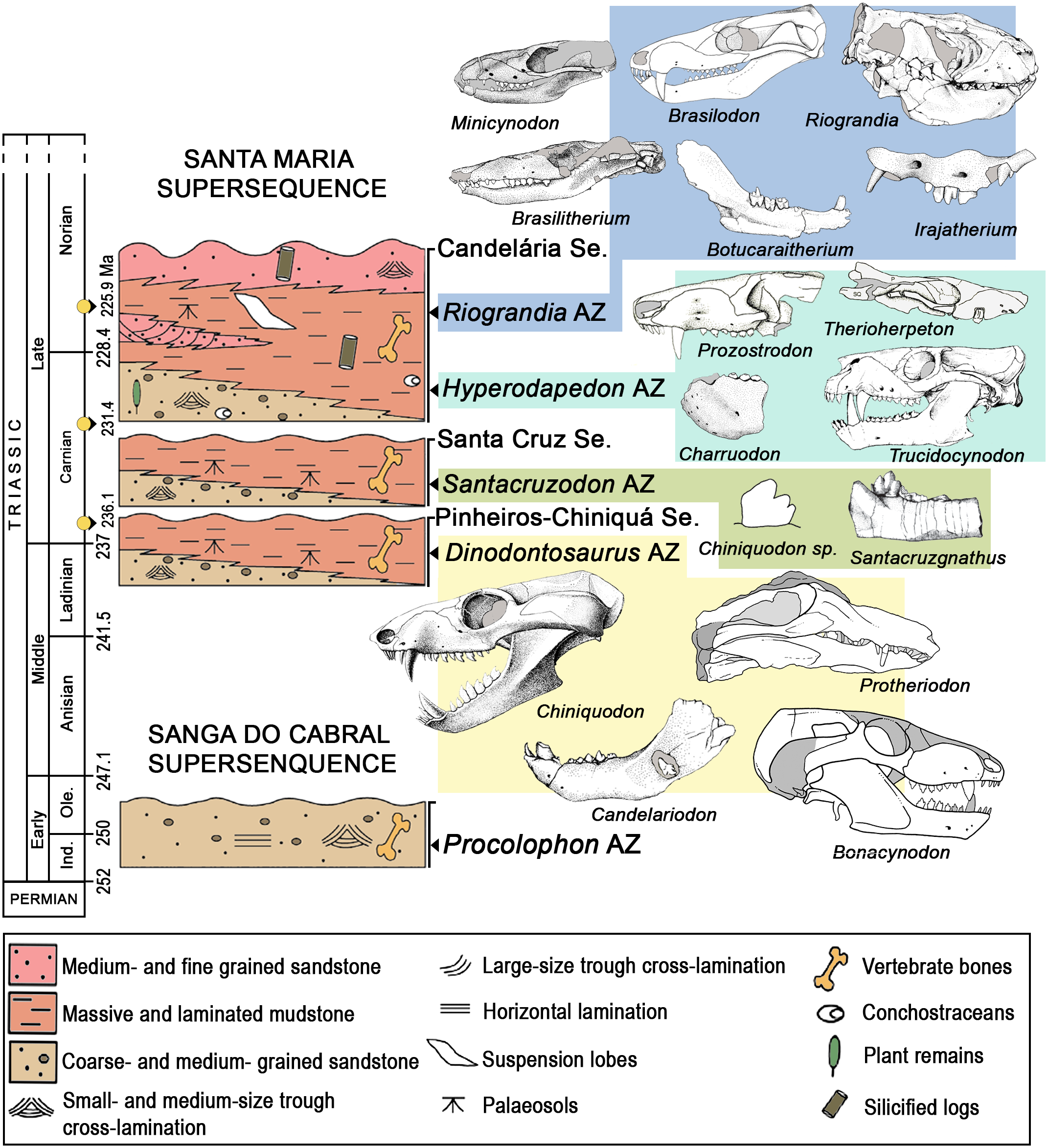
Diagram showing the stratigraphic position of Brasilodon and other probainognathians within the Santa Maria Supersequence

Specimens of Brasilodon have been found in two localities. The holotype was found at the Linha São Luiz locality, within the municipality of Faxinal do Soturno. Other specimens have been found at the Sesmaria do Pinhal locality in the municipality of Candelária; both of these locations lie within the Brazilian part of the Paraná Basin. The rocks where Brasilodon was found belong to the upper part of the Candelária Sequence, which corresponds to a biostratigraphic unit known as the Riograndia Assemblage Zone. The Riograndia AZ has been dated to the early Norian age of the Late Triassic epoch, around 225.42 million years ago. Cynodonts are one of the most common and taxonomically diverse elements in this Assemblage Zone, and are represented by many well-preserved specimens. In addition to Brasilodon, cynodonts are represented by the tritheledontids Irajatherium and Riograndia, the basal mammaliamorph Botucaraitherium, and indeterminate traversodontids. Other animals include the dicynodont Jachaleria, the procolophonid Soturnia, the lepidosauromorphs Cargninia, Clevosaurus and Lanceirosphenodon, and the avemetatarsalians Faxinalipterus, Guaibasaurus, Macrocollum, Maehary, Sacisaurus and Unaysaurus. Indeterminate remains of temnospondyls, phytosaurs and other groups have also been found.

The location where these fossils were found is a fluvial system, characterized by large quantities of fine sandstone forming sandy beds, resulting from sedimentation in the basin during peak flow events.
