= Agudotherium =

Agudotherium Temporal range: Norian ~222–208 Ma

Scientific classification
- Kingdom: Animalia
- Phylum: Chordata
- Clade: Synapsida
- Clade: Therapsida
- Clade: Cynodontia
- Clade: Prozostrodontia
- Genus: †Agudotherium; Stefanello et al., 2020
- Species: †A. gassenae

Binomial name
- †Agudotherium gassenae Stefanello et al., 2020

Extinct genus of cynodonts

Agudotherium is an extinct genus of probainognathian cynodonts from the Late Triassic Candelária Formation of the Paraná Basin in southern Brazil. The genus contains one species, Agudotherium gassenae, which is known from three specimens, all consisting of partial lower jaws.

== Etymology ==
The generic name Agudotherium comes from the municipality of Agudo, Rio Grande do Sul, where the fossils were discovered, and the Greek word thērion (θηρίον), meaning "beast".
