= Charruodon =

Charruodon Temporal range: Carnian ~235–222 Ma

Scientific classification
- Domain: Eukaryota
- Kingdom: Animalia
- Phylum: Chordata
- Clade: Synapsida
- Clade: Therapsida
- Clade: Cynodontia
- Clade: Probainognathia
- Genus: †Charruodon; Abdala & Ribeiro, 2000
- Species: †C. tetracuspidatus

Binomial name
- †Charruodon tetracuspidatus Abdala & Ribeiro, 2000

Extinct genus of cynodonts

Charruodon is an extinct genus of cynodonts which existed in the Hyperodapedon Assemblage Zone of the Santa Maria Formation in the Paraná Basin in southeastern Brazil during the Late Triassic. The genus contains only the type species Charruodon tetracuspidatus, which is known from a single specimen of uncertain provenance. Upon its first description, Charruodon was tentatively placed within the family Therioherpetidae, but a 2017 study by Agustín G. Martinelli and colleagues instead recovered it as a more basal member of Probainognathia. In 2023, Hoffmann, Ribeiro & de Andrade reinterpreted the specimen as representing an early ontogenetic stage, and C. tetracuspidatus to be a nomen dubium.
