= Mário Costa Barberena =

Brazilian paleontologist

Mario Costa Barberena
- Born: April 17, 1934; Santa Vitória do Palmar, Rio Grande do Sul
- Died: 16 December 2013 (aged 79); Porto Alegre
- Scientific career
- Fields: paleontologist and Geologist
- Workplaces: Universidade Federal do Rio Grande do Sul

Mario Costa Barberena (17 April 1934 – 16 December 2013) was a Brazilian paleontologist.

== Biography ==
He graduated in Natural History at the Pontifical Catholic University of Rio Grande do Sul (1956–1959). He completed his doctorate at Harvard University, in stratigraphic paleontology (1977–1978). He was lecturer at the Federal University of Rio Grande do Sul in 1974.

The genus Barberenachampsa is named after him. Has contributed considerably to the Paleorrota Geopark.
