= Prefrontal bone =

Skull bone in some tetrapods

Dromaeosaurus skull

The prefrontal bone is a bone separating the lacrimal and frontal bones in many tetrapod skulls. It first evolved in the sarcopterygian clade Rhipidistia, which includes lungfish and the Tetrapodomorpha. The prefrontal is found in most modern and extinct lungfish, amphibians and reptiles. The prefrontal is lost in early mammaliaforms and so is not present in modern mammals either.

== In dinosaurs ==
The prefrontal bone is a very small bone near the top of the skull, which is lost in many groups of coelurosaurian theropod dinosaurs and is completely absent in their modern descendants, the birds. Conversely, a well developed prefrontal is considered to be a primitive feature in dinosaurs. The prefrontal makes contact with several other bones in the skull. The anterior part of the bone articulates with the nasal bone and the lacrimal bone. The posterior part of the bone articulates with the frontal bone and more rarely the palpebral bone. The prefrontal bone sometimes forms part of the upper margin of the orbit. This bone is part of the skull roof, which is a set of bones that cover the brain, eyes and nostrils.
