= Meckelian groove =

Anatomical feature

The Meckelian groove (or Meckel's groove, Meckelian fossa, or Meckelian foramen, or Meckelian canal) is an opening in the medial (inner) surface of the mandible (lower jaw) which exposes the Meckelian cartilage. It is present in some mammaliaformes.

Modern eutherian mammals (which includes placental mammals) do not have a Meckelian groove.
