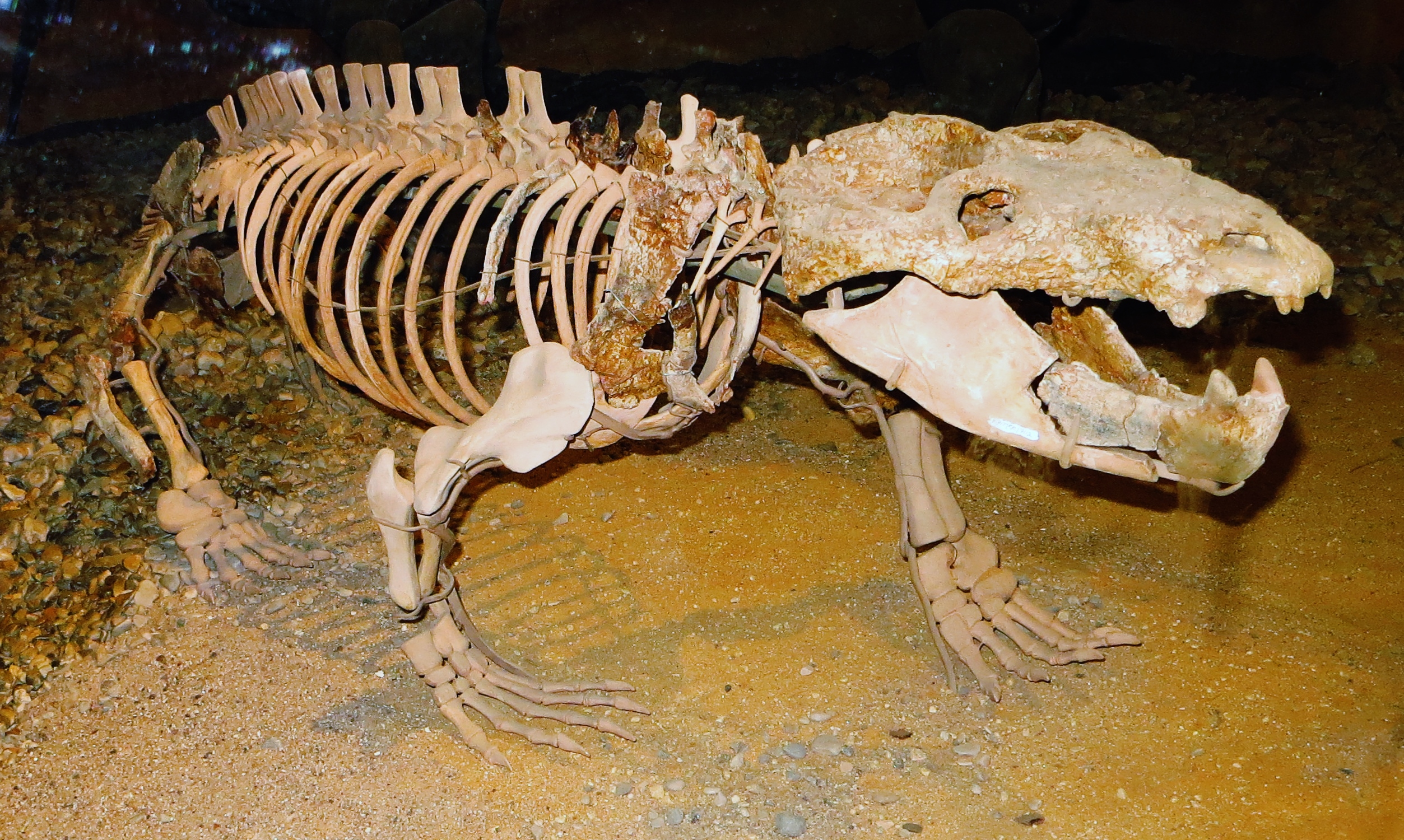
- Fossil of C. theotonicus in the Museum of Paleontology, Tuebingen

Scientific classification
- Kingdom: Animalia
- Phylum: Chordata
- Clade: Synapsida
- Clade: Therapsida
- Clade: Cynodontia
- Family: †Chiniquodontidae
- Genus: †Chiniquodon von Huene 1936

Type species
- †Chiniquodon theotonicus von Huene, 1936

Species
- †C. kalanoro Kammerer et al., 2010; †C. kitchingi (Texeira, 1982); †C. omaruruensis Mocke, Gaetano & Abdala, 2020; †C. sanjuanensis (Martinez & Forster, 1996); †C. theotonicus von Huene, 1936

Synonyms
- Belesodon von Huene, 1936; Probelesodon Romer, 1969

= Chiniquodon =

Chiniquodon Temporal range: Carnian ~235–221.5 Ma

Extinct genus of cynodonts

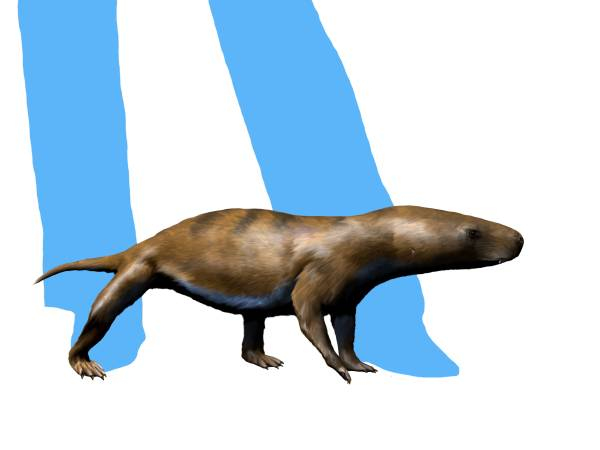
Life reconstruction of C. theotonicus

Chiniquodon is an extinct genus of carnivorous cynodonts, which lived during the Late Triassic (Carnian to Norian) in South America (Argentina and Brazil) and Africa (Namibia and Madagascar).

Chiniquodon was closely related to the genus Aleodon, and close to the ancestry of mammals. Its contemporaries included some of the earliest known dinosaurs. A 2026 study estimated an adult weight of 12 kg and postulated that Chiniquodon was viviparous, in contrast to the widespread understanding that all cynodonts were oviparous until the appearance of therian mammals.

== Classification ==
Chiniquodon theotonicus, the type species, is from the Santa Maria Formation, Brazil and Chañares Formation, Ischigualasto-Villa Unión Basin, northwestern Argentina. This species is known from a number of skulls. The holotype is in the paleontological collection at Tübingen University, Germany.

Chiniquodon kitchingi, from the Santa Maria Formation of Brazil, was described in 1982 by A. M. Sá-Teixeira based on a single skull missing the lower jaw. When first described, it was assigned to the genus Probelesodon, but was reassigned to Chiniquodon in a 1995 paper by Fernando Abdala, as the type species of Probelesodon (P. lewisi) was found to be a junior synonym of C. theotonicus. A 2002 paper by Abdala and Norberto P. Giannini went even further by synonymising C. kitchingi with C. theotonicus. In 2023 the type material of C. kitchingi was redescribed by Hoffmann et al., who found it to be a valid species of Chiniquodon.

Chiniquodon sanjuanensis is from the Cancha de Bochas Member of the Ischigualasto Formation, Ischigualasto-Villa Unión Basin, northwestern Argentina. It was originally assigned to the genus Probelesodon, but was reassigned to Chiniquodon in 2002. It is differentiated from C. theotonicus because of its teeth and the shape of the zygomatic process.

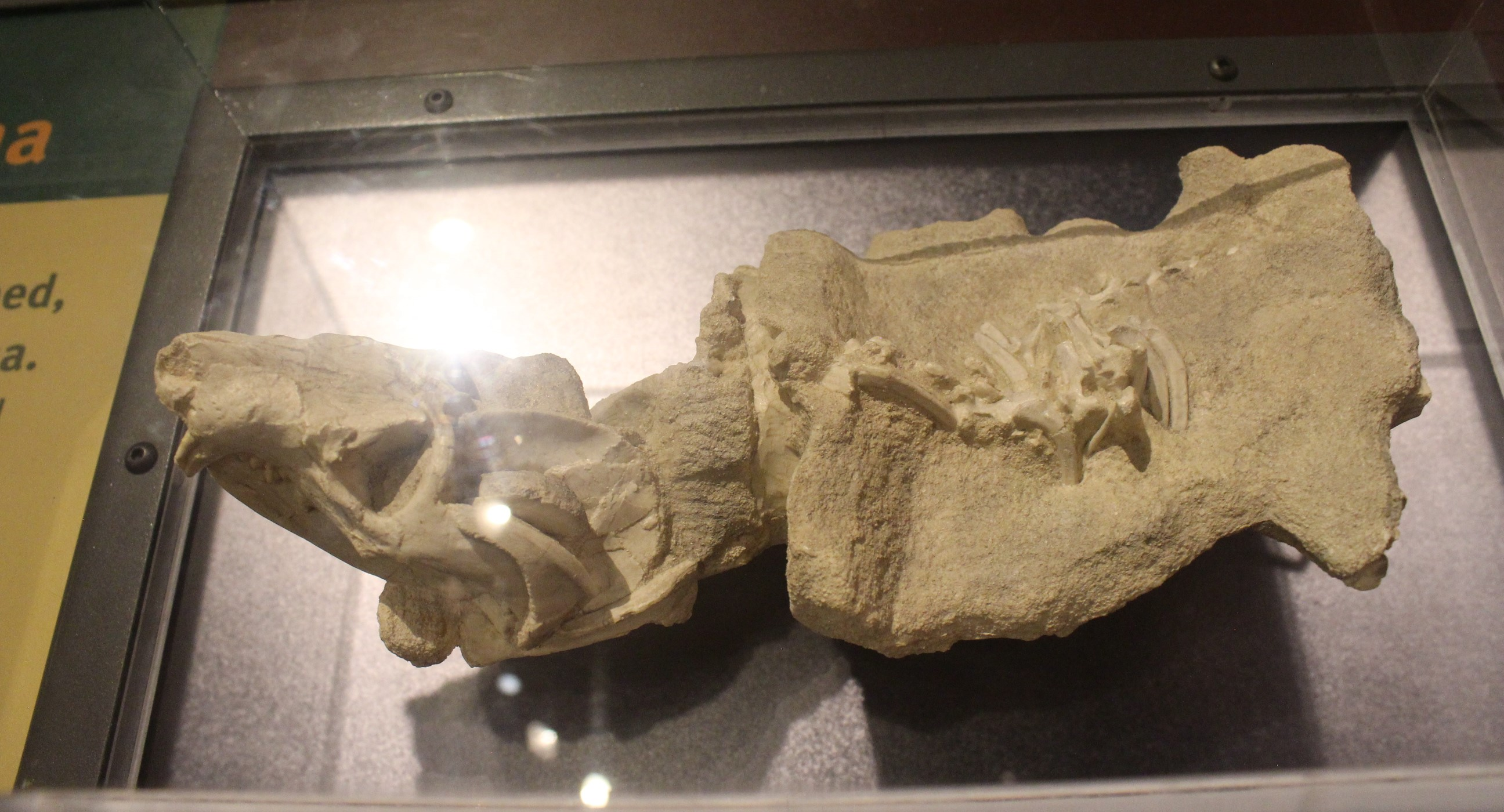
Fossil specimen (FMNH PR 4793) of C. kalanoro in the Field Museum of Natural History

Chiniquodon kalanoro is from the Isalo II Formation, Madagascar. This species is known from a mandible (holotype UA 10607).

Chiniquodon omaruruensis is from the Omingonde Formation of Namibia. It is known from a single specimen (GSN F315), consisting of a complete skull and parts of the postcranial skeleton.
