= Therioherpeton =

Therioherpeton Temporal range: Carnian ~235–206 Ma

Scientific classification
- Domain: Eukaryota
- Kingdom: Animalia
- Phylum: Chordata
- Clade: Synapsida
- Clade: Therapsida
- Clade: Cynodontia
- Clade: Prozostrodontia
- Family: †Therioherpetidae; Bonaparte & Barberena, 1975
- Genus: †Therioherpeton; Bonaparte & Barberena, 1975
- Species: †T. cargnini

Binomial name
- †Therioherpeton cargnini Bonaparte & Barberena, 1975

Extinct genus of cynodonts

Therioherpeton is an extinct genus of small, carnivorous cynodonts belonging to the clade Prozostrodontia, which lived in what is now Brazil during the Late Triassic. Its type species is Therioherpeton cargnini. It was named in 1975 by the palaeontologists José Bonaparte and Mário Costa Barberena based on remains collected in the Hyperodapedon Assemblage Zone of the Santa Maria Formation in the Paraná Basin.
