= Riojanodon =

Riojanodon Temporal range: Triassic

Scientific classification
- Kingdom: Animalia
- Phylum: Chordata
- Clade: Synapsida
- Clade: Therapsida
- Clade: Cynodontia
- Family: †Chiniquodontidae
- Genus: †Riojanodon
- Species: †R. nenoi

Binomial name
- †Riojanodon nenoi Martinelli et al., 2024

Extinct genus of cynodonts

Riojanodon is an extinct genus of chiniquodontid cynodont that inhabited what is now Argentina during the latest Middle and earliest Late Triassic epochs. It is a monotypic genus known from the species R. nenoi.

== Phylogeny ==
The cladogram below is from the study that described Riojanodon.

- Probainognathia
  - Lumkuia fuzzi
  - - Chiniquodontidae
      - Chiniquodon theotonicus
      - Aleodontinae
        - Aleodon brachyrhamphus
        - Aleodon cromptoni
        - Riojanodon nenoi
        - CRILAR-PV 567
        - Cromptodon mamiferoides
    - - Probainognathidae
        - Probainognathus jenseni
        - Bonacynodon schultzi
      - - Ecteniniidae
          - Trucidocynodon riograndensis
          - - Diegocanis elegans
            - Ecteninion lunensis
        - - Protheriodon estudianti
          - - Agudotherium gassenae
            - Prozostrodontia
              - Prozostrodontidae
                - Pseudotherium argentinus
                - Prozostrodon brasiliensis
              - - Therioherpeton cargnini
                - - Irajatherium hernandezi
                  - - Riograndia guaibensis
                    - - - Diarthrognathus broomi
                        - Pachygenelus monus
                      - Mammaliamorpha
                        - - Botucaraitherium belarminoi
                          - - Brasilodon quadrangularis
                            - Mammaliaformes
                        - Tritylodontidae
                          - Oligokyphus major
                          - - Kayentatherium wellesi
                            - - Tritylodon longaevus
                              - Bienotherium yunnanense
