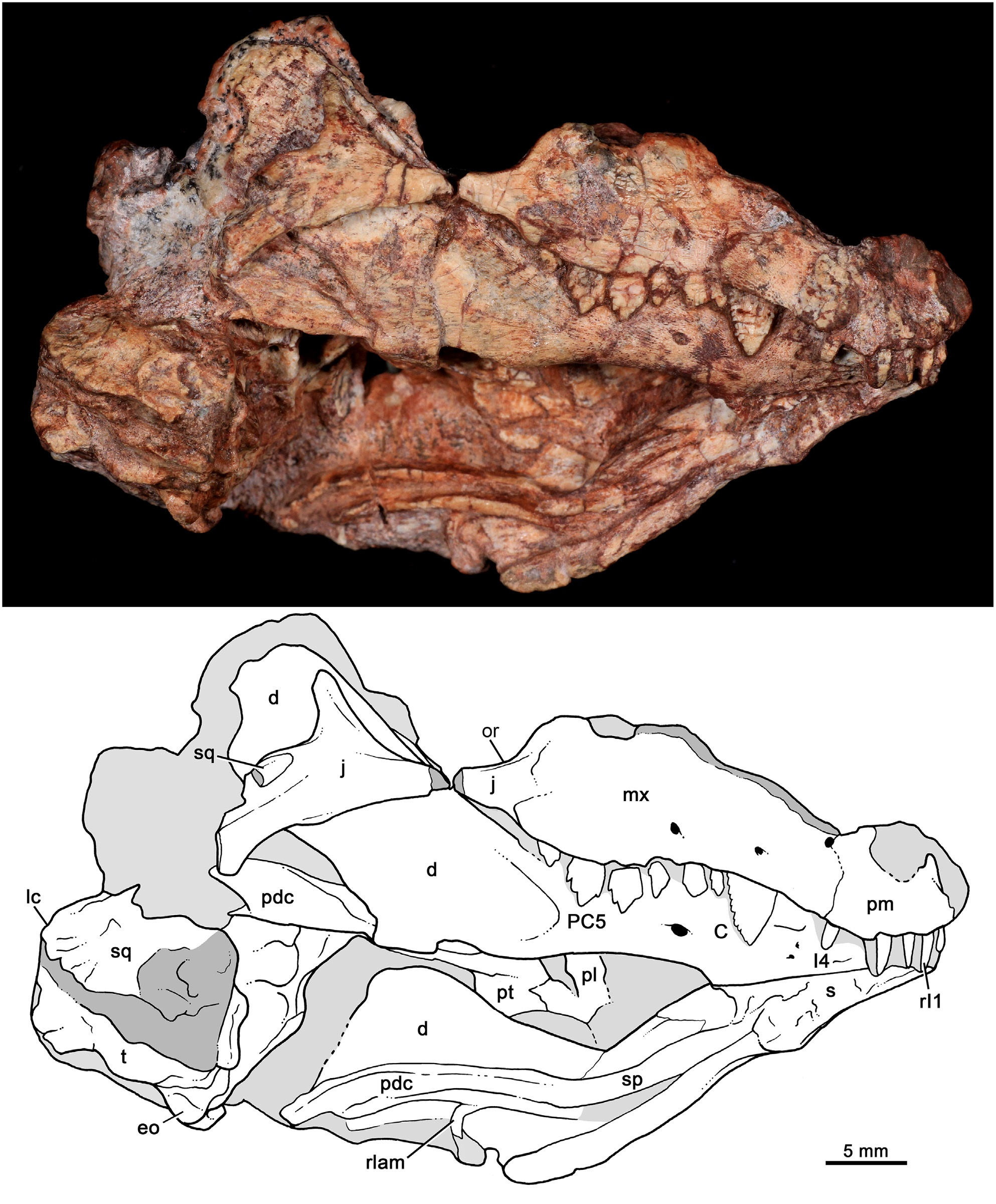
- Skull of the holotype

Scientific classification
- Kingdom: Animalia
- Phylum: Chordata
- Clade: Synapsida
- Clade: Therapsida
- Clade: Cynodontia
- Family: †Probainognathidae
- Genus: †Bonacynodon; Martinelli et al., 2016
- Species: †B. schultzi

Binomial name
- †Bonacynodon schultzi Martinelli et al., 2016

= Bonacynodon =

Bonacynodon Temporal range: Ladinian–Carnian

Extinct genus of cynodonts

Bonacynodon is an extinct genus of cynodonts that lived in what is now southern Brazil during the Triassic period (Ladinian–Carnian ages). The genus is monotypic, containing only the type species Bonacynodon schultzi. B. schultzi is known from two specimens, consisting of two partial skulls and some badly preserved parts of the postcranium. Both specimens were recovered from the Pinheiros-Chiniquá Sequence, part of the Santa Maria Supersequence of the Paraná Basin. This sequence preserves a faunal association known as the Dinodontosaurus Assemblage Zone, which contains numerous other species of cynodonts, dicynodonts and reptiles. Bonacynodon was a small, likely insectivorous cynodont, whose length has been estimated at around 30 centimetres (12 in). It can be distinguished from other cynodonts by its large, serrated (saw-like) canine teeth. Together with the genus Probainognathus of Argentina, it made up the family Probainognathidae, one of the earliest-diverging lineages of the clade Probainognathia. It was a fairly close relative of mammals, the only group of cynodonts alive today.

== Discovery and naming ==
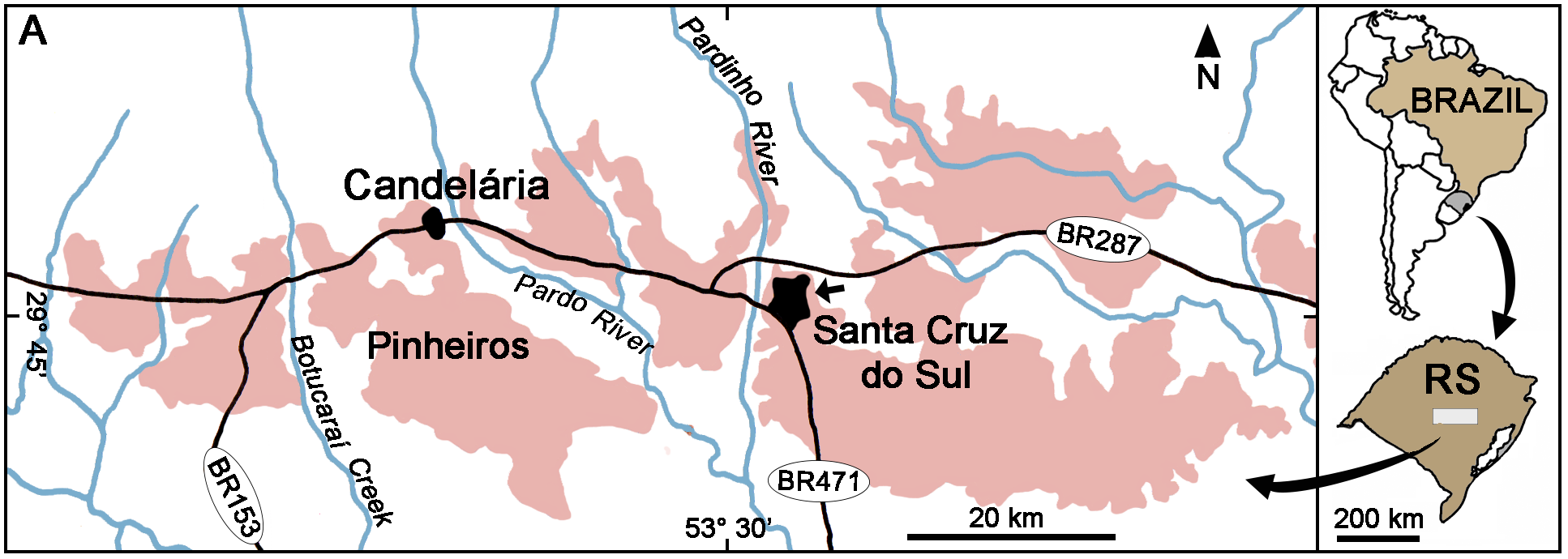
Map showing the Middle to Late Triassic outcrops of the municipalities of Candelária and Santa Cruz do Sul. Both specimens of Bonacynodon were collected from the Pinheiros region, shown on the left side of the map.

Bonacynodon schultzi is known from two specimens, the holotype MCT-1716-R and the referred specimen (paratype) MCT-1717-R. They were both collected by the Brazilian palaeontologist Llewellyn Ivor Price, the holotype in 1946, in two separate rocky outcrops (sangas) in the Pinheiros region, around 12 kilometres (7.5 mi) south of the town of Candelária, Rio Grande do Sul. The rocks belong to the Pinheiros-Chiniquá Sequence of the Santa Maria Supersequence, which has been dated to the Ladinian to early Carnian ages.

The holotype was found in an outcrop known as the Sanga do Janguta, and was preserved together with a specimen of the dicynodont Dinodontosaurus. It consists primarily of a partial skull, including parts of the skull roof, lower jaw, upper and lower dentition, basicranium and palate. The skull roof was heavily damaged during preparation. The holotype also includes some very fragmentary postcranial elements, which have not been described in detail. The referred specimen was found in a different outcrop, the Sanga do Forno. Like the holotype, it preserves parts of the cranium, lower jaw and upper and lower dentition. Its shape has been heavily distorted during fossilisation, but it preserves some parts of the skull that are missing in the holotype. Based on the lack of wear facets on the teeth, it has been suggested that both specimens represent subadult individuals.

The specimens were first given a proper description in 2016, when they were given a new generic and specific name by Agustín G. Martinelli and colleagues. The first part of the generic name Bonacynodon is derived from the surname of José Bonaparte, an Argentine palaeontologist who specialised in the Mesozoic vertebrates of South America. The second part, cynodon, is partly derived from the Ancient Greek word κύων (kuōn), meaning "dog", and is a reference to it being a cynodont. The specific epithet schultzi honours Cesar L. Schultz, a Brazilian palaeontologist and professor at the Federal University of Rio Grande do Sul.

== Description ==
Bonacynodon was a small cynodont, with an estimated total length of around 30 centimetres (12 in).

=== Skull ===
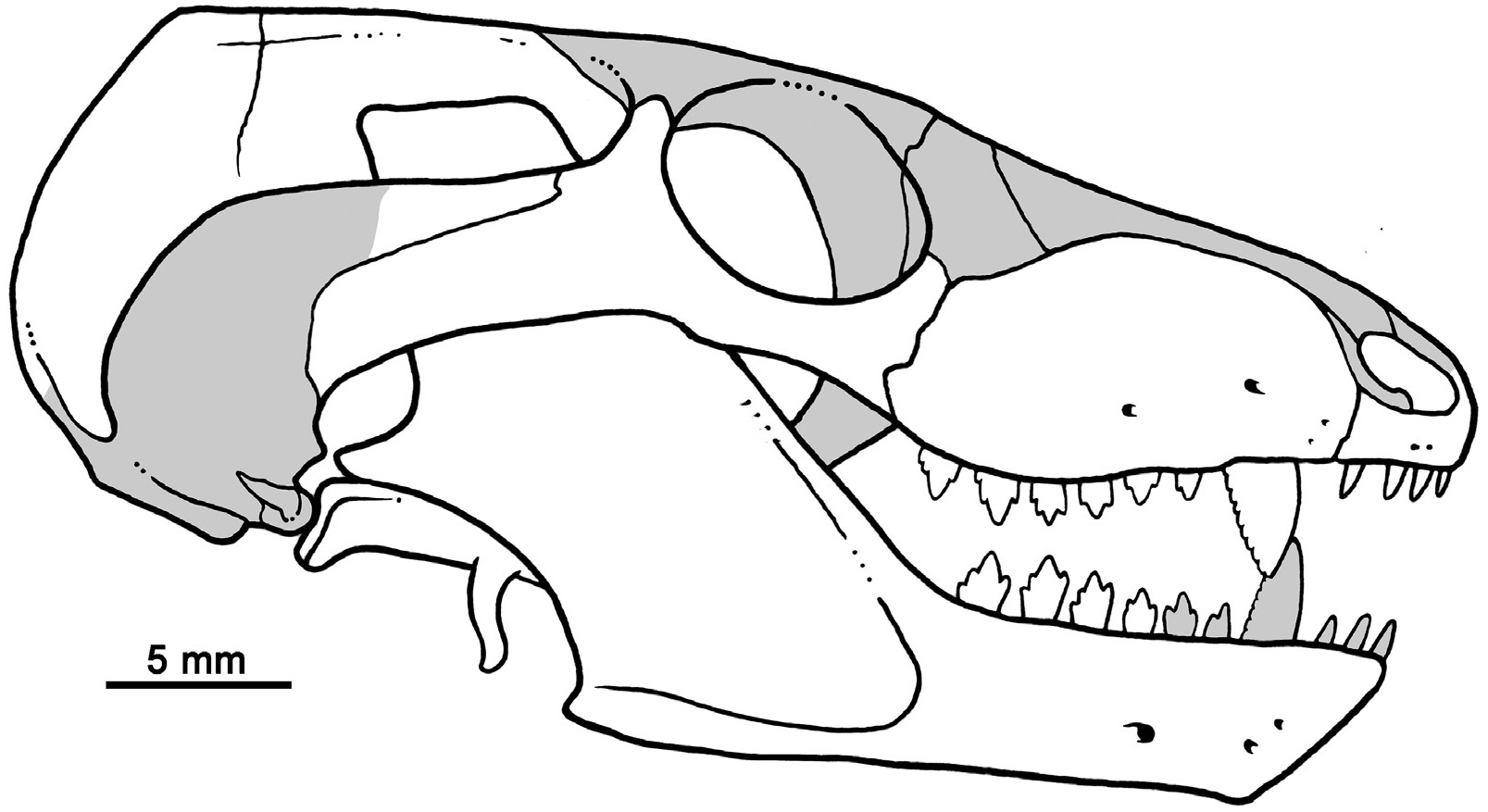
Skull reconstruction, based partially on its close relative Probainognathus

The skull of Bonacynodon was about 6–7 centimetres (2.4–2.8 in) long. The temporal region (area behind the eye sockets) was wide, and somewhat longer than the snout. The sagittal crest (a narrow ridge running across the top of the skull) was relatively low. The secondary palate (roof of the mouth) consisted of two parts, a larger section formed by the maxillae (upper jaw bones), and a smaller one formed by the palatine bones. As in the closely related Probainognathus, the palate ended in front of the last postcanine; this is somewhat shorter than what is seen in the more basal (early-diverging) chiniquodontids and the more derived (late-diverging) prozostrodonts.

The upper jaw consisted of two bones, the premaxilla in the front, and the maxilla in the back. Above the canines and front postcanines were multiple small holes called infraorbital foramina; at least three foramina are seen in the holotype, while the referred specimen preserves two or three. Based on other basal probainognathians, Bonacynodon likely had additional foramina which have not been preserved in the fossils. The tooth-bearing part of the upper jaw had a sigmoid (S-shaped) curve, sloping downwards near the postcanines before curving upwards again near the orbit. The lower jaw consisted primarily of a single bone, the dentary. The dentary body was somewhat tall, and the symphysis (the connection between the two halves of the dentary) was apparently unfused. The front part of the dentary bore at least three mental foramina on the right side of the holotype. The back part possessed a long and backwards-pointing projection known as the coronoid process. A large basin called the masseteric fossa stretched from near the last postcanine to the tip of the coronoid process. Like in other probainognathians, the postdentary bones (a set of bones at the back of the lower jaw) were highly reduced compared to the condition in more basal cynodonts, forming a small, rod-like structure.

=== Dentition ===
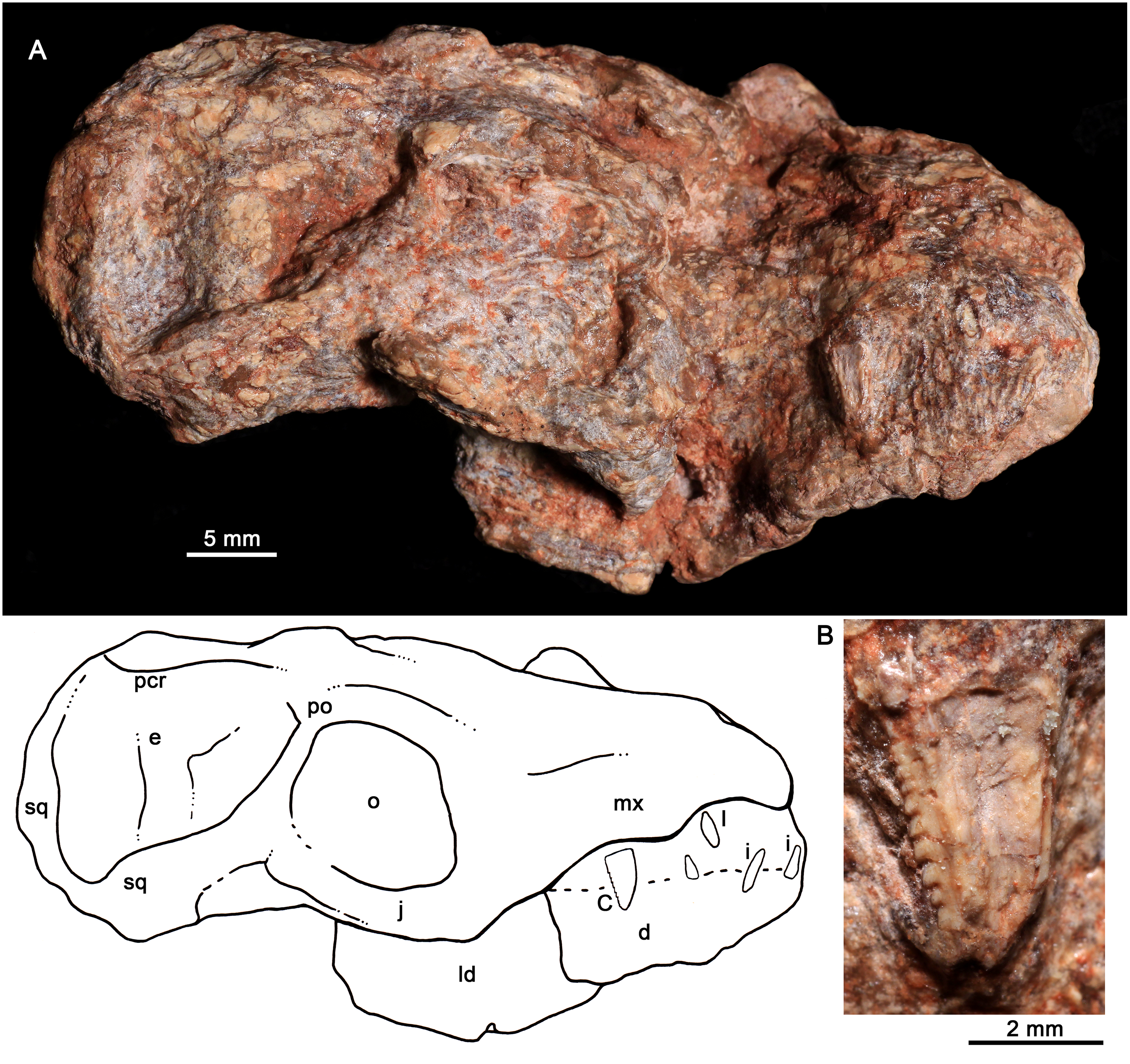
Skull of the referred specimen

Bonacynodon possessed three types of teeth: incisors, canines and postcanines. It appears to have had four pairs of incisors in its upper jaw; these were slender, with a round cross section. The first three incisors were roughly equal in size, while the fourth one was slightly smaller. The incisors were widely spaced, with a particularly large gap (diastema) between the third and fourth ones. There was a similarly large gap between the last incisor and the canine. The upper canines were large, and flattened from side to side. The canines had strongly serrated (saw-like) back edges, which is an autapomorphy (unique derived feature) of the taxon. The lower incisors are not known from either specimen. Of the lower canines, only a partial left root from the holotype is known. The shape and size of this root was however similar to that of the upper canines.

Behind each upper canine were six postcanine teeth, which were widely spaced and did not contact each other. The crowns were compressed from side to side, and possessed multiple straight, unserrated cusps (pointed projections of the teeth) which were arranged in a line. The first three upper postcanines bore three cusps, with the one in the middle (cusp A) being the largest, and the ones in front and back (cusps B and C respectively) being smaller. The fourth and fifth upper postcanines additionally possessed a small fourth cusp (cusp D) behind cusp C, and there may also have been a fifth (accessory) cusp. The sixth upper postcanine was apparently less developed than the fourth and fifth ones, and it bore at least three cusps. The lower postcanines are incompletely known, but they appear to have been similar to the upper ones. No cingulum has been observed on the postcanines. Unlike in the prozostrodonts, there was no abrupt change in morphology between the front and back postcanines, and the roots were not constricted.

== Classification ==
When describing Bonacynodon, Martinelli and colleagues performed a phylogenetic analysis to find out its relationships to other cynodonts. It was recovered as the sister taxon of Probainognathus, a similar probainognathian from the Chañares Formation of Argentina. Together with Probainognathus, Bonacynodon was placed in the family Probainognathidae. The probainognathids were found to be closely related to Prozostrodontia, a clade (group formed by all descendants of a common ancestor) which includes mammals, the only extant (living) cynodonts, as well as several other groups. Subsequent analyses have upheld the sister relationship of Bonacynodon and Probainognathus.

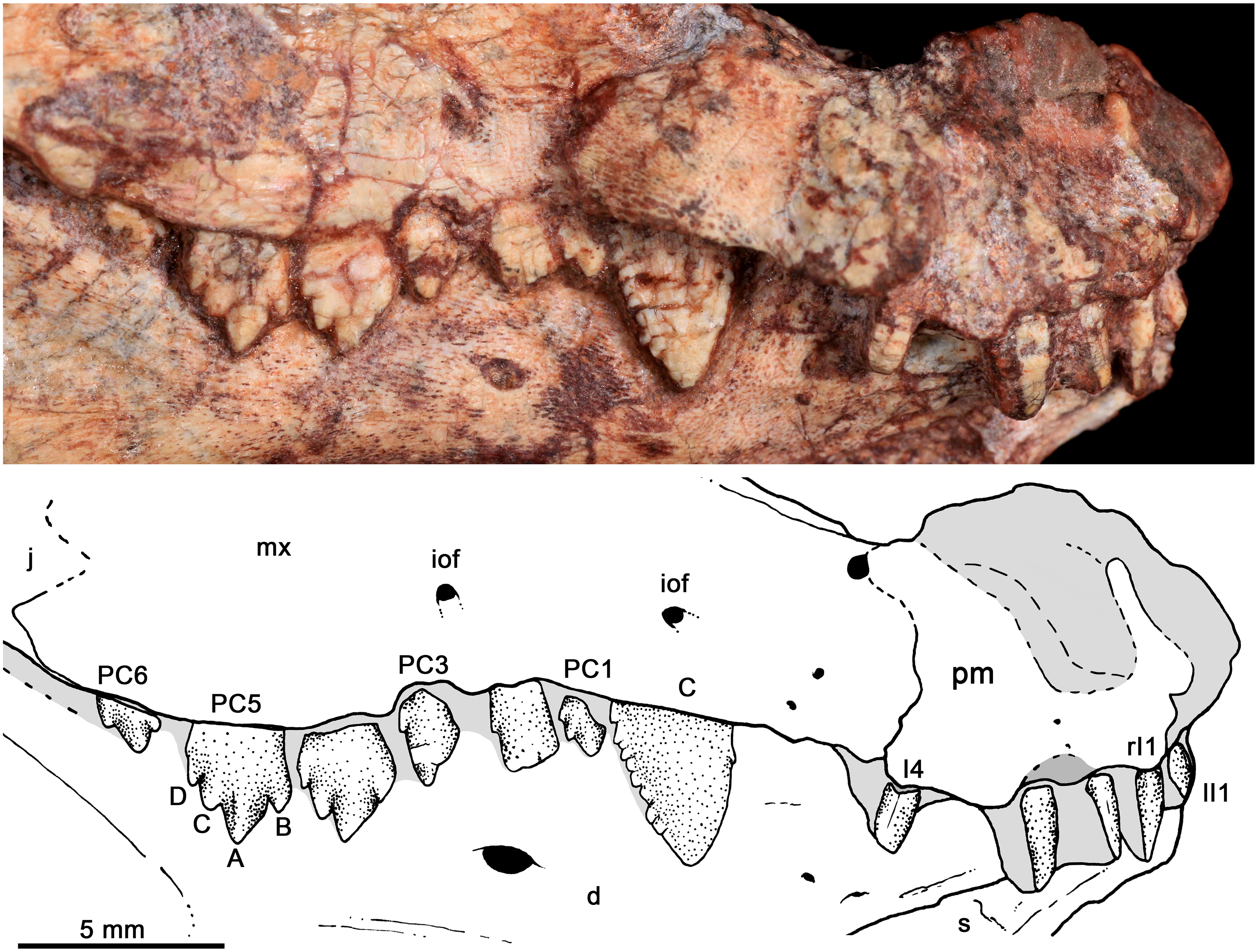
Closeup of the teeth of the holotype

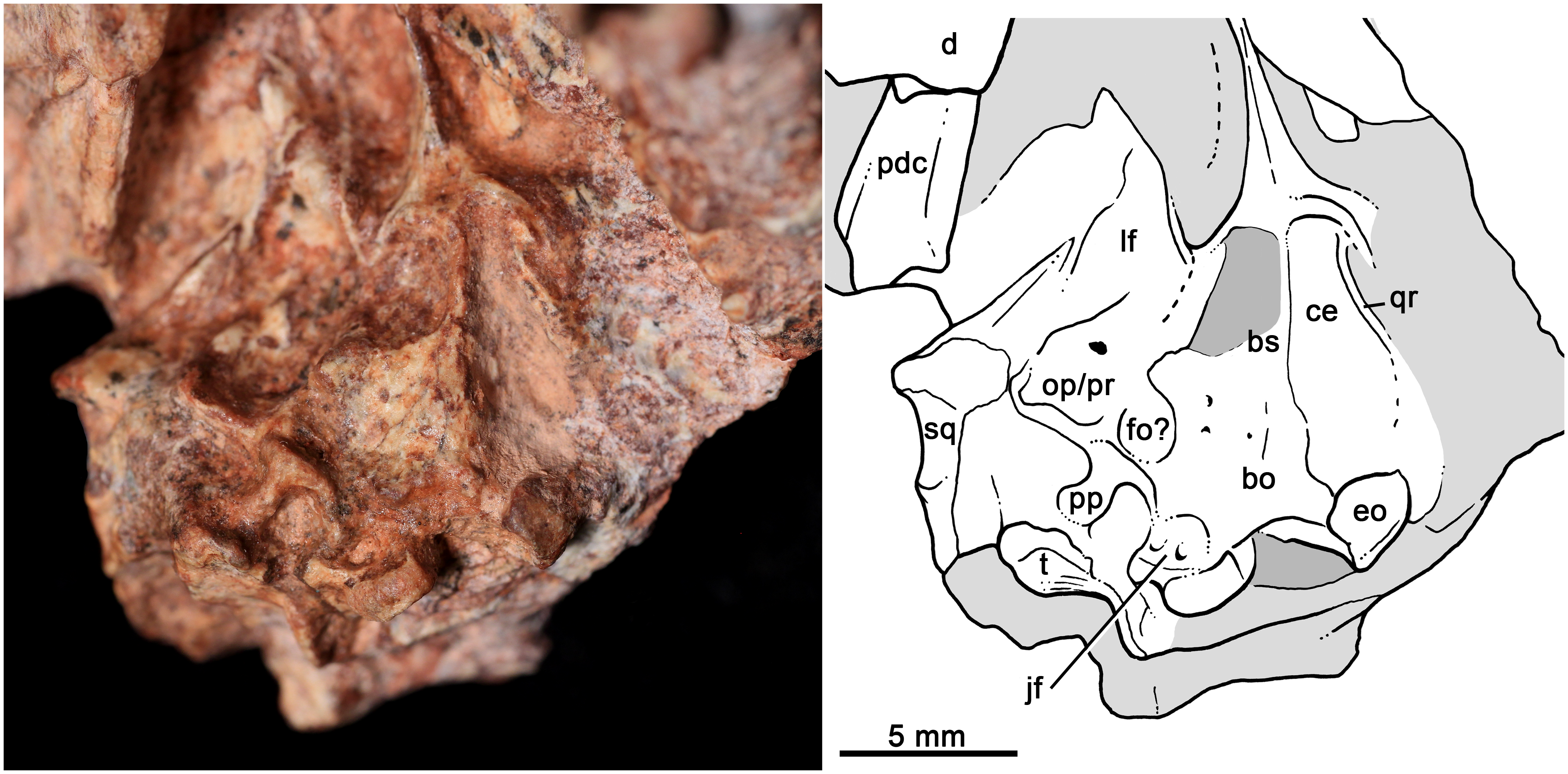
Basicranium of the holotype

Below is a cladogram following the analysis of Martinelli et al. (2016):

- Probainognathia
  - Ecteninion
  - - Chiniquodon
    - - Probainognathidae
        - Bonacynodon
        - Probainognathus
      - - Protheriodon
        - Prozostrodontia
          - Prozostrodon
          - - Therioherpeton
            - - Tritheledontidae
              - - Tritylodontidae
                - - Botucaraitherium
                  - - - Brasilitherium
                      - Brasilodon
                    - Mammaliaformes
                      - Adelobasileus
                      - - Sinoconodon
                        - Morganucodon

== Palaeobiology ==
Early-diverging probainognathians like the ecteniniids and Chiniquodon had postcanine teeth with strongly recurved (and in the case of the ecteniniids, even serrated) cusps, which would have been well-suited for a carnivorous diet. The straight, unserrated postcanine cusps of probainognathids like Bonacynodon were more similar to those of basal prozostrodonts; this is thought to be an adaptation towards insectivory. As the holotype was preserved together with the remains of a dicynodont, Schwanke & Kellner (2009) hypothesised that the animal might have been an opportunistic scavenger. However, in 2016 Martinelli and colleagues suggested that it could instead have eaten insect larvae and other invertebrates that fed on the decomposing dicynodont.

== Palaeoenvironment ==
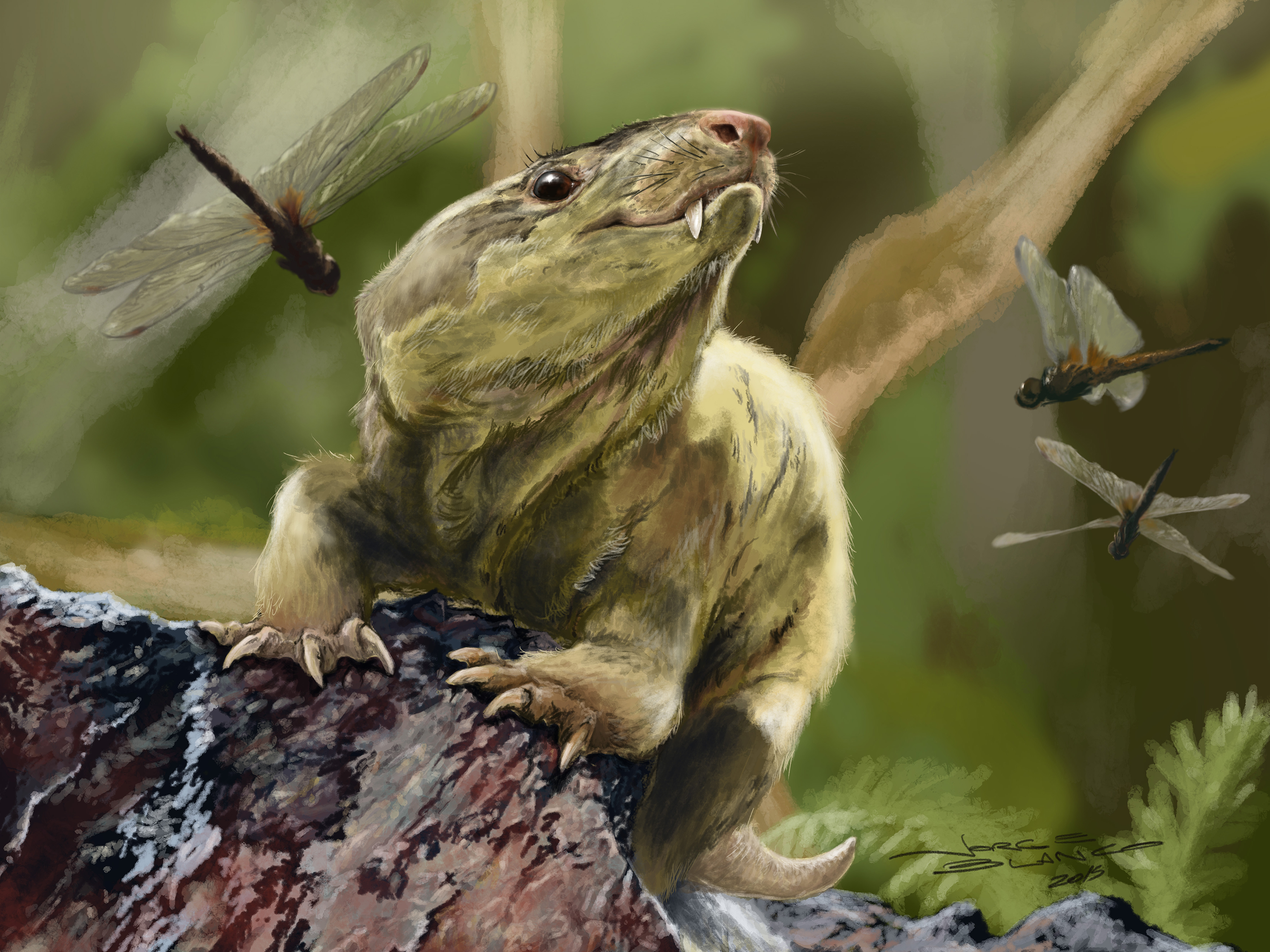
Life reconstruction

Bonacynodon belongs to the Dinodontosaurus Assemblage Zone, the lowermost of the four biostratigraphic units of the Santa Maria Supersequence of the Paraná Basin. The Dinodontosaurus AZ corresponds to the Pinheiros-Chiniquá Sequence, one of the three stratigraphic sequences of the Supersequence. Together with the overlying Santa Cruz Sequence (containing the Santacruzodon AZ) and the lower part of the Candelária Sequence (containing the Hyperodapedon AZ), it comprises the traditional Santa Maria Formation. The Pinheiros-Chiniquá and Santa Cruz Sequences appear to have been deposited during a dry period, in which the landscape was dominated by loessic plains.

Cynodonts make up a large portion of the fauna of the Dinodontosaurus Assemblage Zone. In addition to Bonacynodon, these include the probainognathians Aleodon, Candelariodon, Chiniquodon and Protheriodon, and the traversodontids Luangwa, Massetognathus, Protuberum, Scalenodon and Traversodon. Other vertebrates from this Assemblage Zone include the dicynodonts Dinodontosaurus and Stahleckeria, the parareptile Candelaria, the rhynchosaur Brasinorhynchus, the enigmatic archosauriform Barberenasuchus, several species of pseudosuchians (the group that contains modern-day crocodilians and their extinct relatives), and the aphanosaur (primitive stem-bird) Spondylosoma.
