= Cromptodon =

Cromptodon Temporal range: Anisian ~247.2–242 Ma

Scientific classification
- Kingdom: Animalia
- Phylum: Chordata
- Clade: Synapsida
- Clade: Therapsida
- Clade: Cynodontia
- Family: incertae sedis
- Genus: †Cromptodon; Bonaparte, 1972
- Species: †C. mamiferoides

Binomial name
- †Cromptodon mamiferoides Bonaparte, 1972

Extinct genus of cynodonts

Cromptodon is an extinct genus of cynodonts from the Triassic of Cerro Bayo de Portrerillos, Cerro de las Cabras Formation, Argentina, South America. It is known only from PVL 3858, a mandible.

== Description ==
The skull has been estimated to have a length of 2.7 centimetres (1.1 in).

The morphology and distribution of the cups on the postcanines is considered to be very similar to Thrinaxodon liorhinus differing in the fact that the cingulum is lingually wider. The coronoid, prearticular and angular processes, Bonaparte considered, were more developed than those in Thrinaxodon, being more similar to Tribolodon (now Bolotridon). The lower postcanines are buccolingually expanded.

== Classification ==
Bonaparte originally classified Cromptodon as a galesaurid. In 1991, J. A. Hopson, pointed out a resemblance between the teeth of Cromptodon and juvenile Aleodon and reclassified Cromptodon as a chiniquodontid. In 2003, Fernando Abdala and Norberto P. Giannini systematically described Chiniquodontidae and found both Cromptodon and Aleodon to fall outside of Chiniquodontidae as both lacked features their study found to be diagnostic of the family, although additional material was required to provide a definite taxonomic placement. A 2024 study by Agustín G. Martinelli and colleagues once again found Cromptodon to be a chiniquodontid, belonging to the clade Aleodontinae together with Aleodon and Riojanodon.

== See also ==
- List of therapsids
