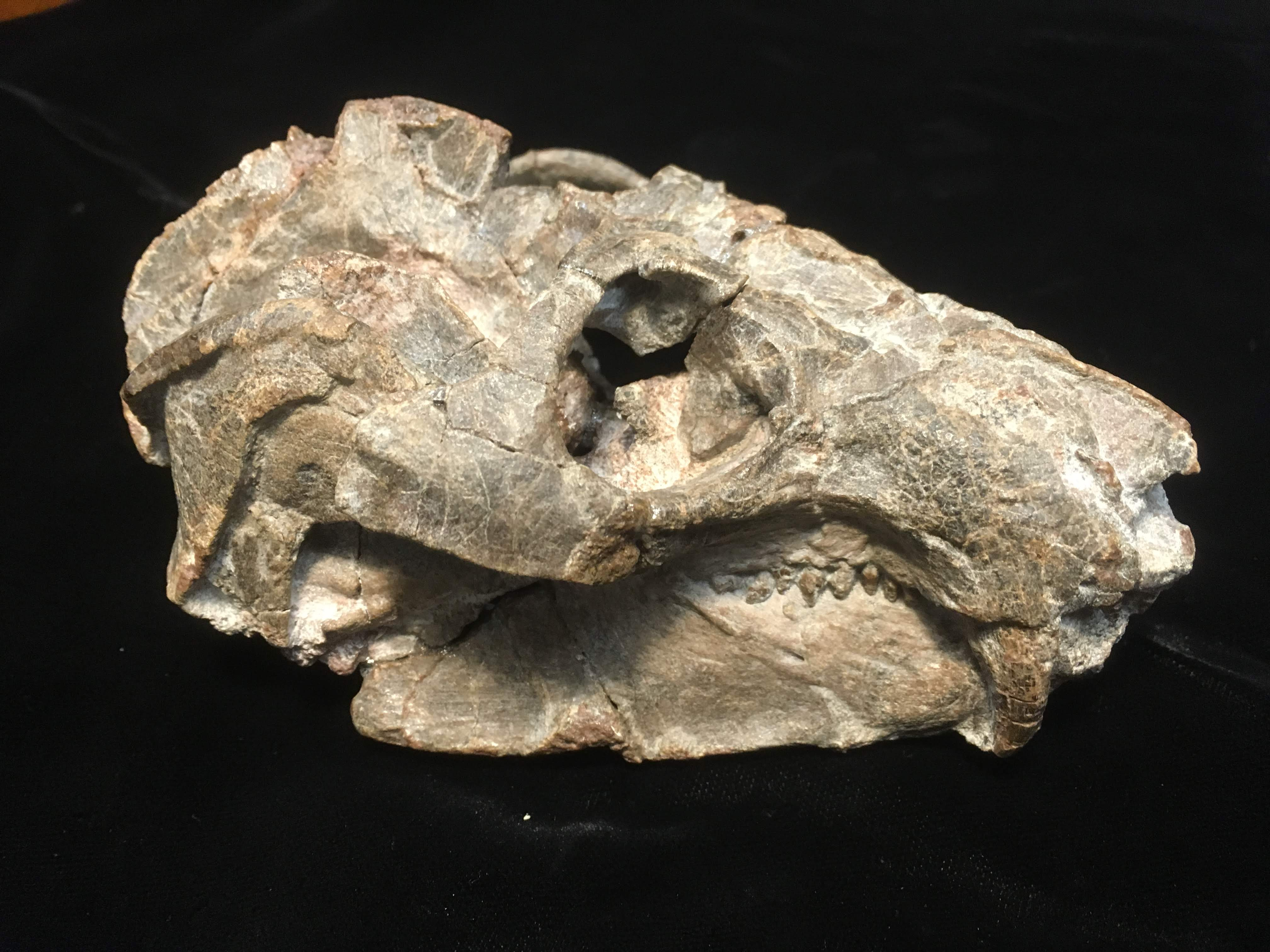
- Skull

Scientific classification
- Kingdom: Animalia
- Phylum: Chordata
- Clade: Synapsida
- Clade: Therapsida
- Clade: Cynodontia
- Family: †Chiniquodontidae
- Genus: †Aleodon; Crompton, 1955

Type species
- Aleodon brachyrhamphus Crompton, 1955

Other species
- A. cromptoni Martinelli et al., 2017

= Aleodon =

Aleodon Temporal range: Ladinian-Early Carnian

Extinct genus of cynodonts

Aleodon is an extinct genus of cynodonts that lived from the Middle to Late Triassic. Relatively few analyses have been conducted to identify the phylogenetic placement of Aleodon, although some have placed it as a sister taxon to Chiniquodon. Two species of Aleodon are recognized: A. brachyrhamphus which was discovered in Tanzania, and A. cromptoni which was discovered most recently in Brazil.

The name for the genus Aleodon was created when Alfred W. "Fuzz" Crompton initially discovered the type species, Aleodon brachyrhamphus. The genus name, "Aleodon" referred to the grinding nature of the postcanine teeth, while "brachyrhamphus" referred to the relatively short snout of the specimen. The most recently discovered species, A. cromptoni was named after Crompton.

== Discovery and classification ==
In 1955, Aleodon was initially classified as a gomphodont cynodont based on the partial skull and lower jaw fossils found in 1933 in Tanzania. The classification was based on the presence of three types of post-canines that were identified in the fossil that were similar to another well-known gomphodont, Diademodon tetragonus.

It was later argued in 2001 by Hopson and Kitching that Aleodon be classified under Chiniquodontidae based on less-worn dentition of unpublished specimens. This classification was accepted by many sources. However, a study done the following year by Abdala and Gianni found, based on fossils found in Namibia, that Aleodon (and Cromptodon) both had well developed lingual cingular platforms in their post-canines, a characteristic that Chiniquodontidae did not possess.

While not many analyses have been done to clarify the phylogenetic relationships of Aleodon thus far, those that have been done describe this genus as the sister taxon of Chiniquodon.

== Description ==
=== Dentition ===
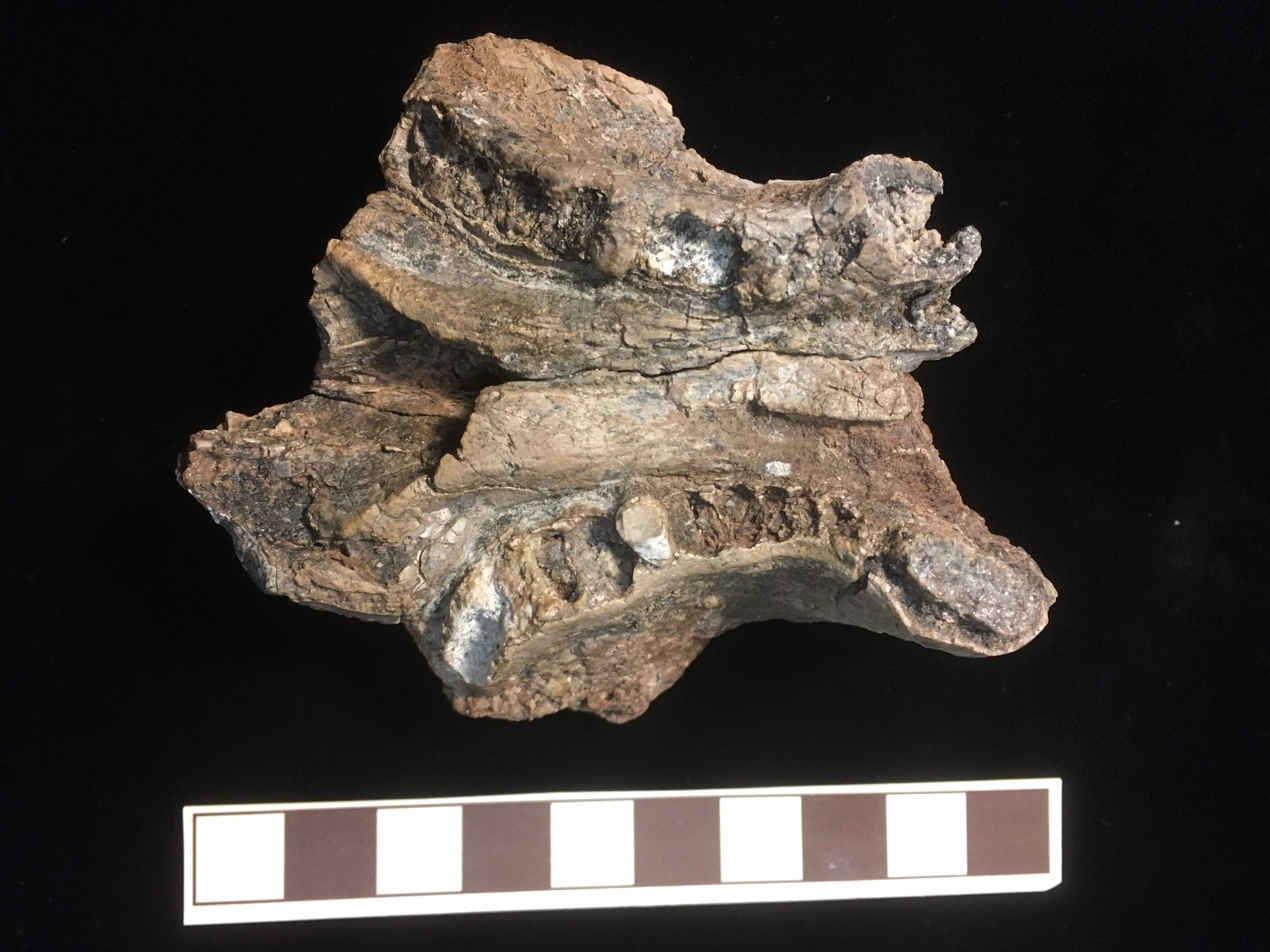
Lower jaw of Aleodon showing the postcanine patterning and long osseous secondary palate

The dentition of Aleodon is the most significant morphological feature to distinguish it from other genera. Crompton pointed out three distinct regions of the postcanine row: anterior circular, transversely expanded ovate, and sectorial posterior teeth (described as "shearing" by Crompton). These three regions of post canines were very similar to a well-known gomphodont, Diademodon tetragonus (which led Crompton to believe that Aleodon was part of Gomphodonta). Crompton also noted that Aleodon uniquely possessed two incisors on the lower jaw which differs from most cynodonts which primitively had four. Based on more fossils, Aleodon was also found to have a long secondary palate, a characteristic that was shared with members of the monophyletic group Chiniquodontidae and resulted in its reidentification to Probainognathia from Gomphodonta. Shortly after, specimens of Aleodon showed the possession of well-developed lingual cingular platforms on the post canines. This finding resulted in some researchers removing Aleodon from Chiniquodontidae due to the group being not characterized by the possession of well-developed lingual cingular platforms. The lingual cingular platform that is expanded in both labiolingual and mesiodistal dimensions relative to the labial portion of the crown is also the most developed of all Triassic probainognathians. These observations led some researchers to believe that Aleodon (along with Candelariodon) may be specimens that exhibit the gradual development of the cingular platform.

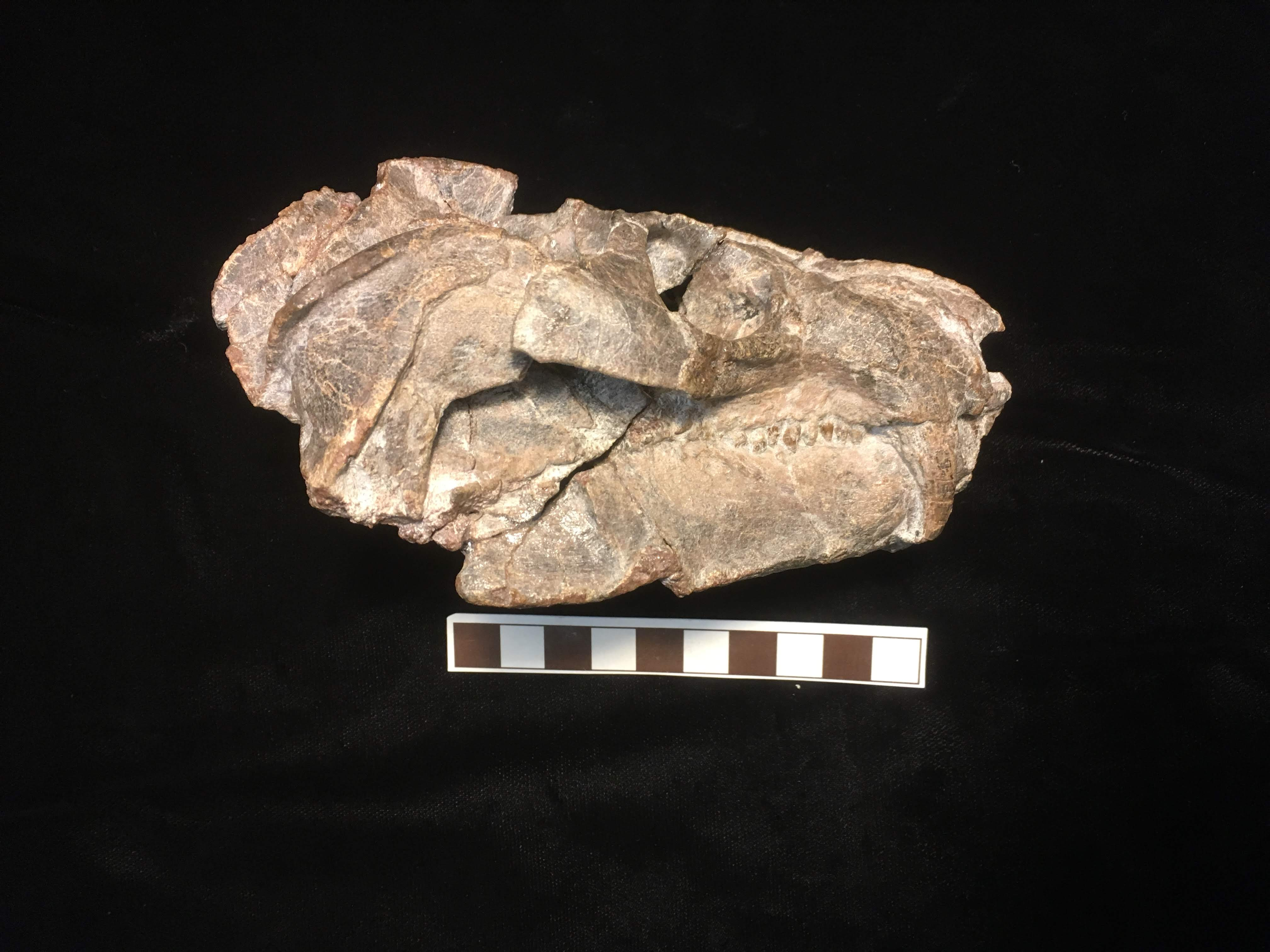
Lateral view of the skull

=== Skull ===
Based on specimens found in Brazil, Aleodon was found to share the same general cranial morphology of Chiniquodontidae. Diagnostic features of Chiniquodontidae are zygomatic arches flaring laterally, angulation between the ventral edge of the maxillary zygomatic process and the anteroventral margin of the jugal, elongated pterygoid flanges that end in a thin projection, and a long secondary palate. When Aleodon was first described by Crompton, he noted the presence of a pineal foramen, though later specimens showed no evidence of a pineal foramen on this taxon's skull. Aleodon is also characterized by its relatively short snout.

== Geological/Paleoenvironmental information ==
=== Manda Formation (Tanzania) ===
Specimens of Aleodon were first recovered from the Triassic Manda Beds of Tanzania by Parrington in the 1930s. The Manda Beds were first surveyed by Gordon M. Stockley from June to October 1930. There was further collection by Parrington and Nowack in the 1930s in which Aleodon brachyrhamphus was later described by Crompton. The collections showed that the Manda Beds contained fauna such as thecodontians, cynodonts, and dicynodonts, as well as a large amphibian and a rhynchosaur. The formation was described as being 2000 meters thick with purple to brown mudstones with grey sandstones in between. From 60 to 150 meters below the top of the formation, reptile bones were found while most (65%) of the specimens were found 1180 and 1310 meters below the surface.

=== Omingonde Formation (Namibia) ===
Fossil vertebrates in the Omingonde Formation of Namibia were first found and published by Keyser in 1973. Among the fossils, he described amphibians, cynodonts and dicynodonts. The cynodonts were initially represented by Cynognathus and herbivorous gomphodonts. After the discovery of Aleodon among other cynodont specimens such as Chiniquodon, Luangwa, and an unidentified traversodontid in 2009, the Omingonde Formation is considered to possess the most diverse fauna of Middle Triassic cynodonts in the world. The discovery also provided researchers a definite link between two faunas in South America and East Africa. From this, the Omingonde Formation was also considered the key in "reconstructing the biogeography of Southern Gondwana during the Middle Triassic".

=== Rio Grande do Sul (Brazil) ===
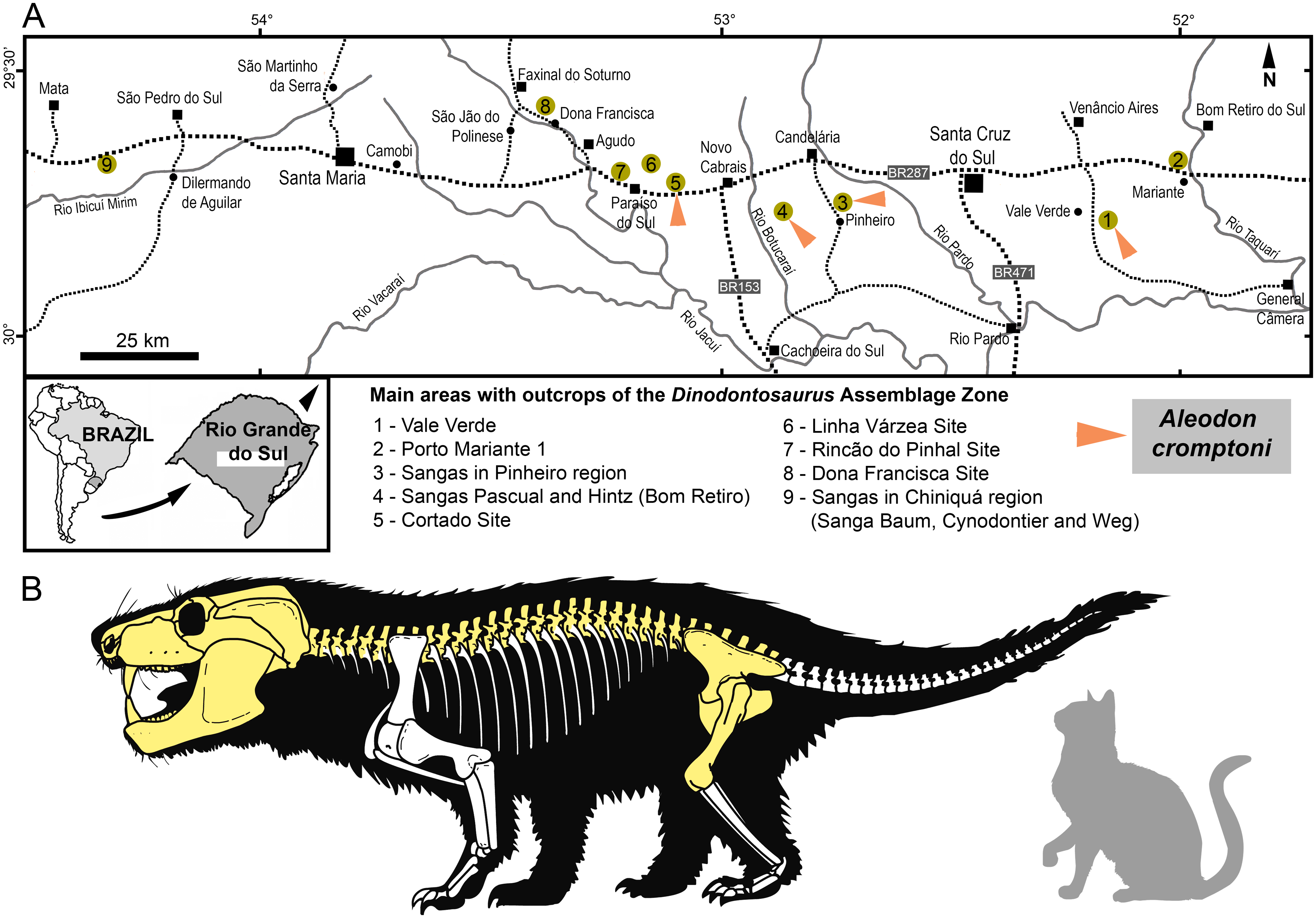
Map of localities in Rio Grande do Sul with Aleodon cromptoni as well as skeletal reconstruction based on bones that have been found (in yellow).(Martinelli et al. 2017)

Most recently, a new species of Aleodon (A. cromptoni) was found in Rio Grande do Sul, southern Brazil. The specimens were first collected in 1988 by Daniel and Abraão Cargnin.
