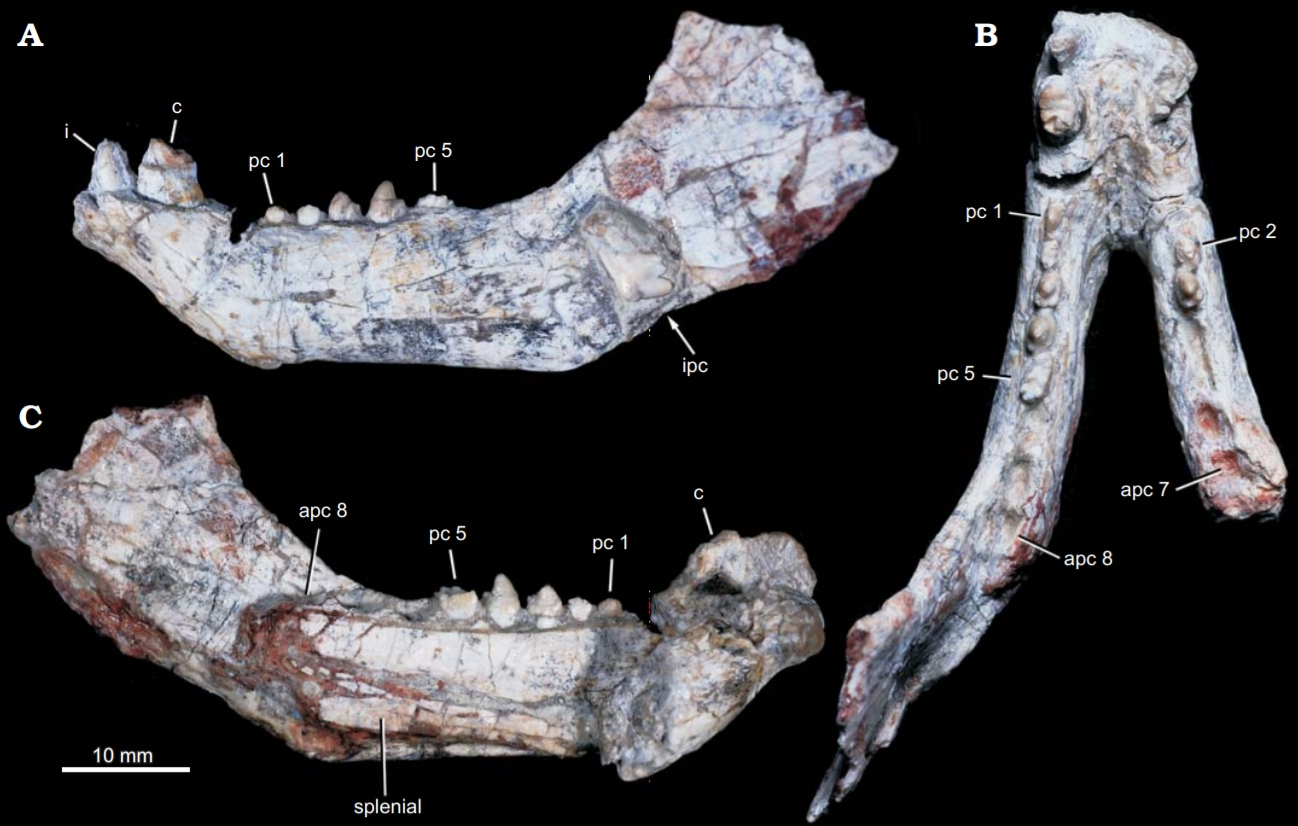
- Holotype fossil of C. barberenai

Scientific classification
- Domain: Eukaryota
- Kingdom: Animalia
- Phylum: Chordata
- Clade: Synapsida
- Clade: Therapsida
- Clade: Cynodontia
- Clade: Probainognathia
- Genus: †Candelariodon de Oliveira et al., 2011
- Species: †C. barberenai

Binomial name
- †Candelariodon barberenai de Oliveira et al., 2011

= Candelariodon =

Candelariodon Temporal range: Ladinian–Carnian ~242–235 Ma

Extinct genus of cynodonts

Candelariodon is an extinct genus of carnivorous probainognathian cynodonts from the Middle to Late Triassic Santa Maria Formation of the Paraná Basin in Rio Grande do Sul state, Brazil. Candelariodon is known from a partial mandible having some complete teeth. It was first named by Téo Veiga de Oliveira, Cesar Leandro Schultz, Marina Bento Soares and Carlos Nunes Rodrigues in 2011 and the type species is Candelariodon barberenai.

== Description ==
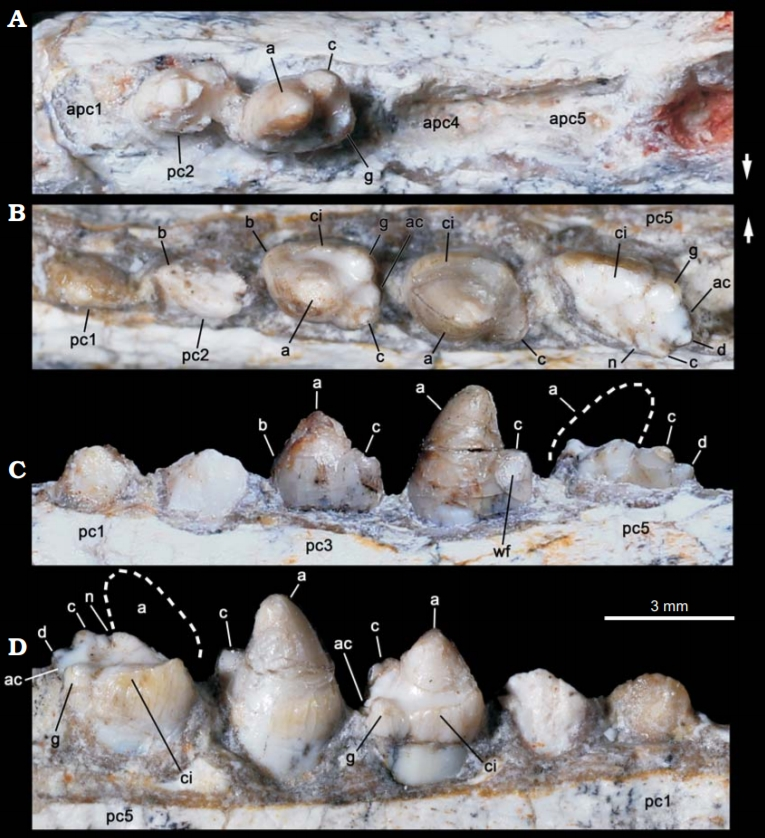
Lower postcanine dentition of C. barberenai

The holotype (MMACR PV-0001-T) of Candelariodon barberenai comes from the Dinodontosaurus Assemblage Zone of the Pinheros-Chiniquá Sequence, Santa Maria Supersequence. It corresponds to the lower portion of the traditional Santa Maria Formation and the Santa Maria 1 Sequence of Zerfass et al. (2003). The outcrop that yielded MMACR PV-0001-T is located about 20 kilometres (12 mi) south of Candelária, Rio Grande do Sul, southeastern Brazil, in the Pinheiro, an area in which several tetrapods characteristic of the Dinodontosaurus Assemblage Zone have been discovered.

== Classification ==
Martinelli et al. (2017) performed a phylogenetic analysis where Candelariodon was recovered as the sister taxon of a clade formed by Protheriodon and Prozostrodontia; a cladogram from that study is shown below:

- Probainognathia
  - Ecteninion
  - - Chiniquodon
    - - - Bonacynodon
        - Probainognathus
      - - Candelariodon
        - - Protheriodon
          - Prozostrodontia
            - Prozostrodon
            - - Therioherpeton
              - - - Pachygenelus
                  - Riograndia
                - - - Oligokyphus
                    - - Kayentatherium
                      - - Bienotherium
                        - Tritylodon
                  - - Botucaraitherium
                    - - - Brasilitherium
                        - Brasilodon
                      - - Adelobasileus
                        - - Sinoconodon
                          - Mammaliaformes
