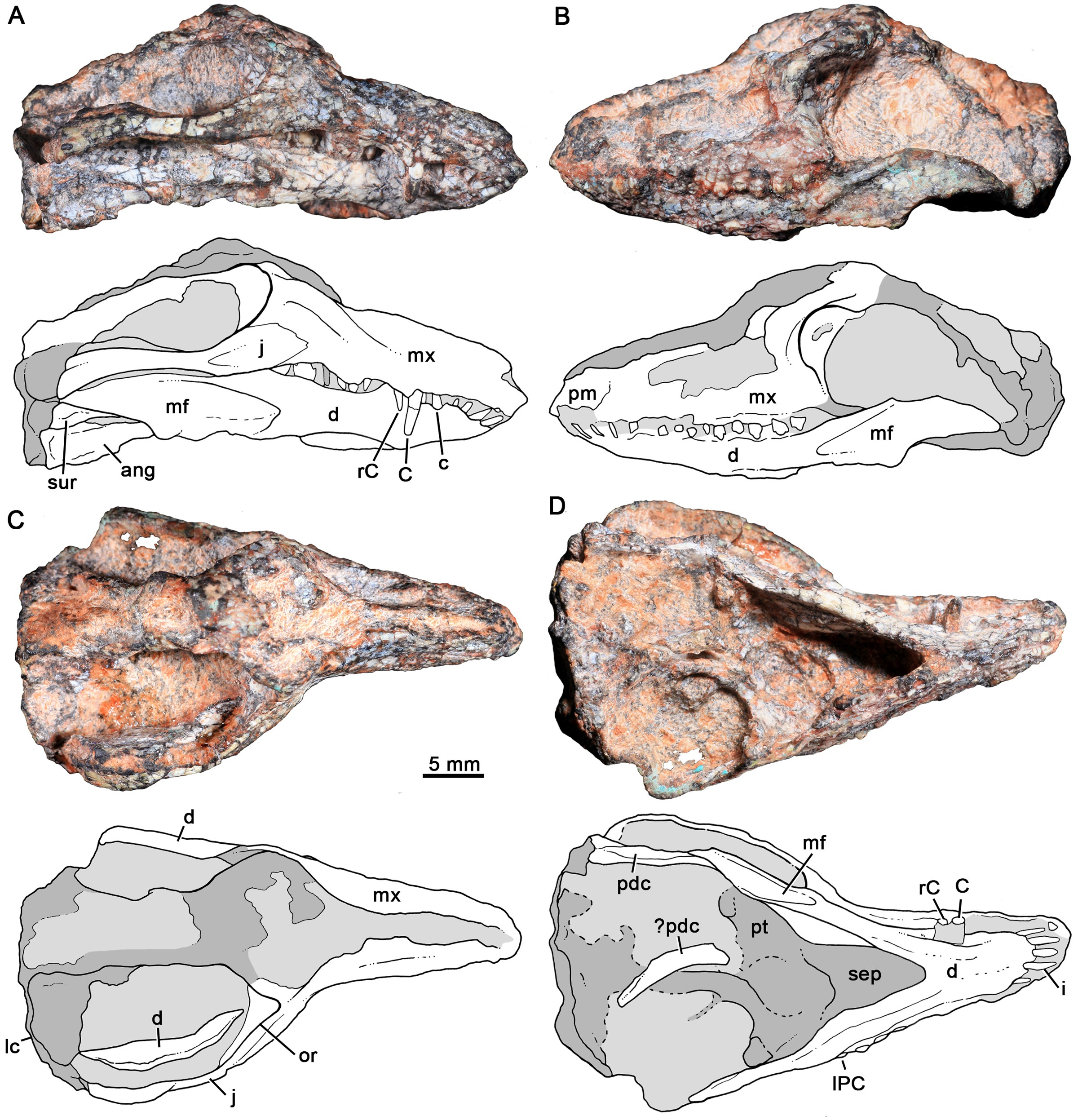
- Skull

Scientific classification
- Kingdom: Animalia
- Phylum: Chordata
- Clade: Synapsida
- Clade: Therapsida
- Clade: Cynodontia
- Clade: Probainognathia
- Genus: †Protheriodon; Bonaparte et al., 2006
- Species: †P. estudianti

Binomial name
- †Protheriodon estudianti Bonaparte et al., 2006

= Protheriodon =

Protheriodon Temporal range: Ladinian ~242–235 Ma

Extinct genus of cynodonts

Protheriodon is an extinct genus of probainognathian cynodonts which existed in the Santa Maria Formation of the Paraná Basin in southeastern Brazil during the middle Triassic period. It contains the species Protheriodon estudianti. It was first described by Argentine palaeontologist José Bonaparte, who assigned it to the family Brasilodontidae. More recent studies have however recovered it in a more basal position than other brasilodontids, just outside Prozostrodontia.

Cladogram from Martinelli et al., 2017:

- Probainognathia
  - Ecteninion
  - - Chiniquodon
    - - - Bonacynodon
        - Probainognathus
      - - Candelariodon
        - - Protheriodon
          - Prozostrodontia
