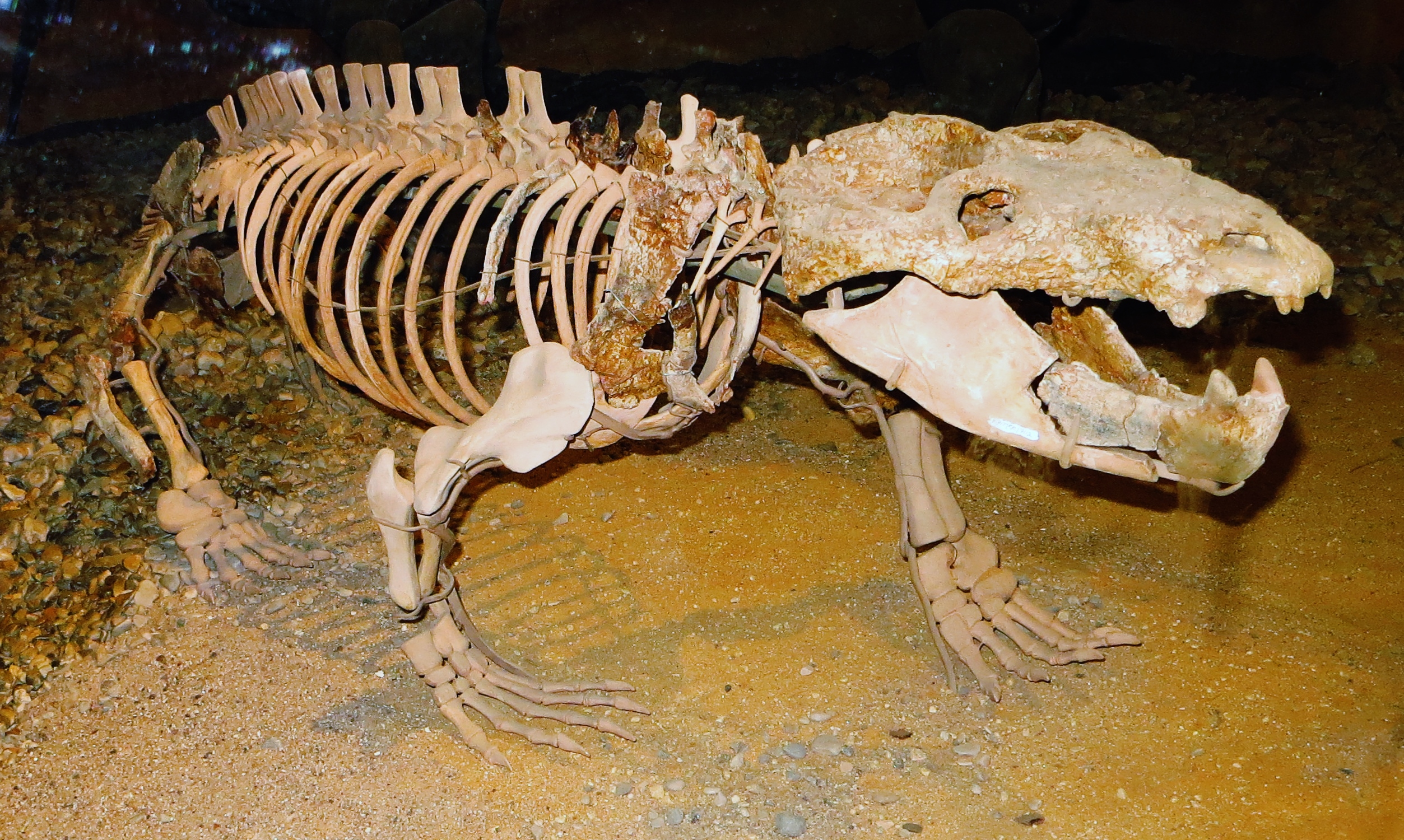
- Restored skeleton of Chiniquodon theotonicus

Scientific classification
- Kingdom: Animalia
- Phylum: Chordata
- Clade: Synapsida
- Clade: Therapsida
- Clade: Cynodontia
- Clade: Probainognathia
- Superfamily: †Chiniquodontoidea von Huene, 1936
- Family: †Chiniquodontidae von Huene, 1936

Genera
- †Chiniquodon; †Aleodontinae Martinelli et al., 2024; †Aleodon; †Cromptodon; †Riojanodon

= Chiniquodontidae =

Chiniquodontidae Temporal range: Middle Triassic - Late Triassic

Extinct family of cynodonts

Chiniquodontidae is an extinct family of basal probainognathian cynodonts that lived in what is now Africa and South America during the Middle and Late Triassic. It is currently thought to include four valid genera: Aleodon, Chiniquodon, Cromptodon and Riojanodon. Two additional genera (Belesodon and Probelesodon) are usually regarded as junior synonyms of Chiniquodon.
