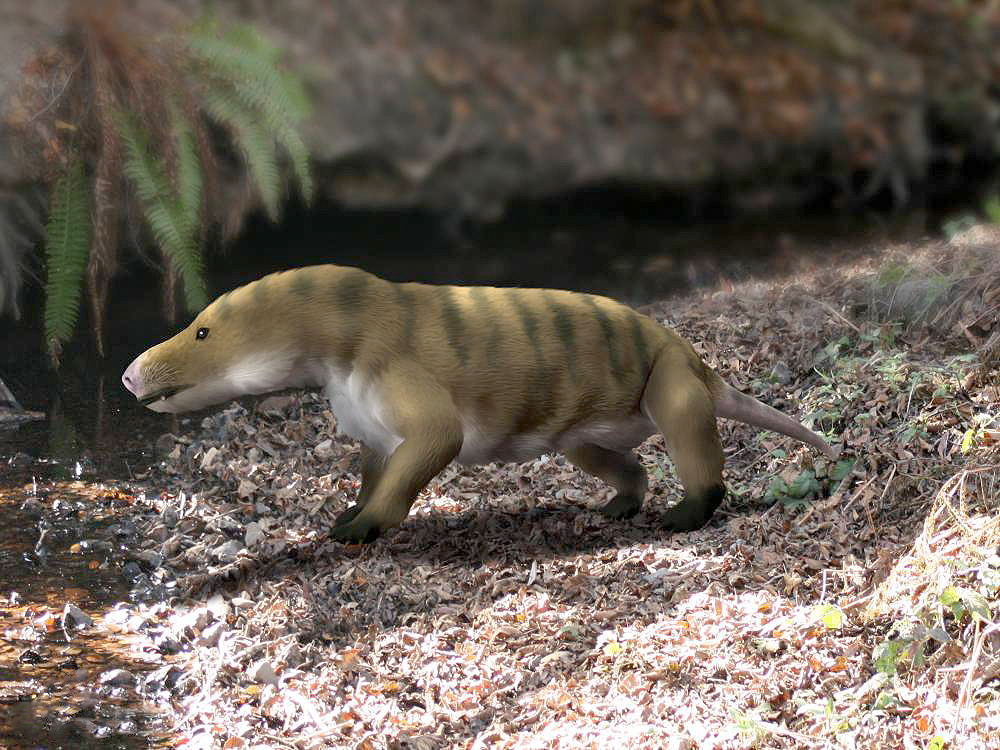
- Restoration of Probainognathus jenseni

Scientific classification
- Kingdom: Animalia
- Phylum: Chordata
- Clade: Synapsida
- Clade: Therapsida
- Clade: Cynodontia
- Clade: Probainognathia
- Family: †Probainognathidae
- Genus: †Probainognathus; Romer, 1970

Type species
- Probainognathus jenseni Romer, 1970

= Probainognathus =

Probainognathus Temporal range: Late Triassic ~235–221.5 Ma

Extinct genus of cynodonts

Probainognathus meaning "progressive jaw" is an extinct genus of cynodonts that lived around 235 to 221.5 million years ago, during the Late Triassic in what is now Argentina. Together with the genus Bonacynodon from Brazil, Probainognathus forms the family Probainognathidae. Probainognathus was a relatively small, carnivorous or insectivorous cynodont. Like all cynodonts, it was a relative of mammals, and it possessed several mammal-like features. Like some other cynodonts, Probainognathus had a double jaw joint, which not only included the quadrate and articular bones like in more basal synapsids, but also the squamosal and surangular bones. A joint between the dentary and squamosal bones, as seen in modern mammals, was however absent in Probainognathus.

== Discovery and naming ==
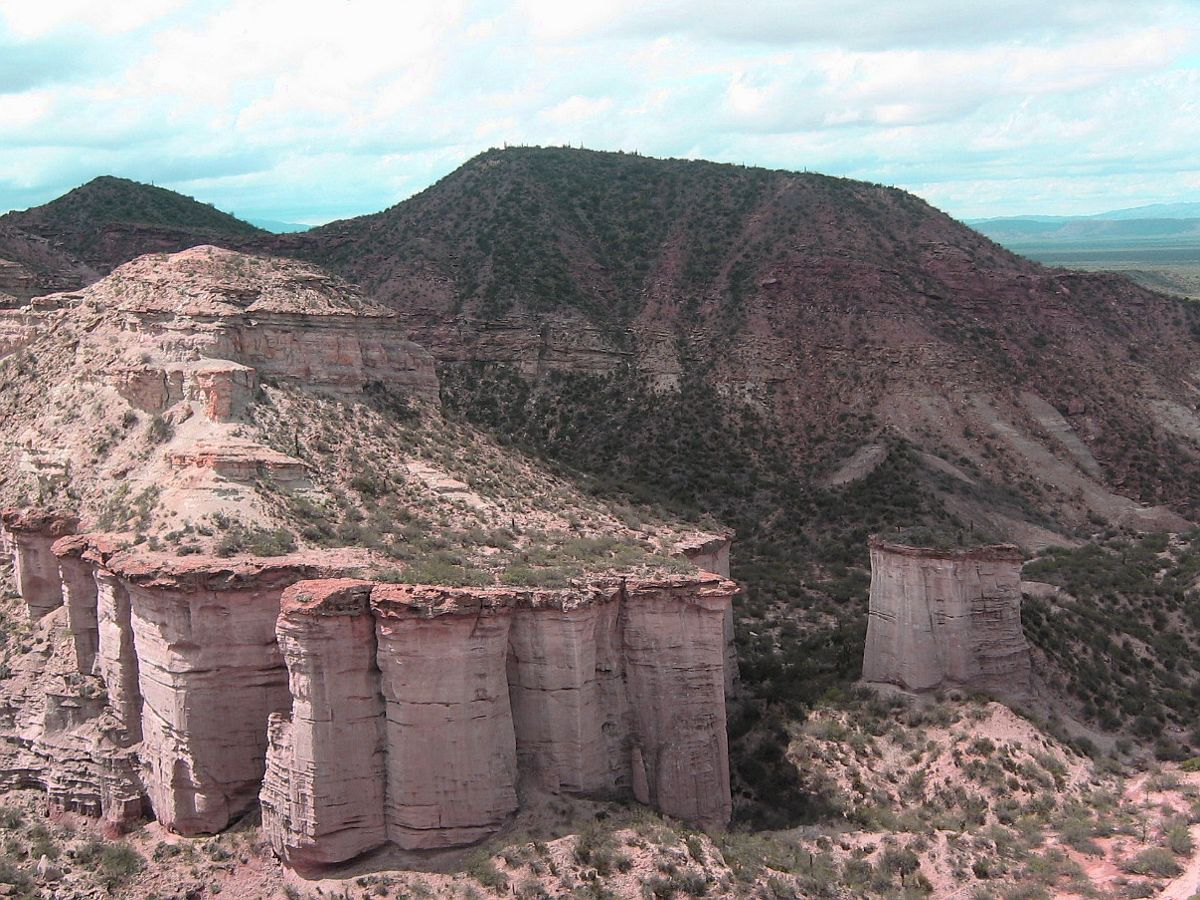
The landscape of La Rioja Province, in which remains of Probainognathus have been found

The first specimens of Probainognathus jenseni were discovered in the Chañares Formation in La Rioja Province, Argentina, by a group headed by the Harvard collector James A. Jensen. The specimens were collected 3 kilometres (1.9 mi) north of the terminus of the Rio Chañares at the Campo de Talampaya.

Probainognathus jenseni was first described and named by the Harvard paleontologist Alfred Sherwood Romer in 1970. The generic name Probainognathus means "progressive jaw" in Greek, referencing its advanced jaw articulation. The specific epithet jenseni honours James A. Jensen.

A juvenile skull (PVSJ 410), from the Ischigualasto Formation of northwestern Argentina, was assigned to cf. Probainognathus in a 1994 paper by José Bonaparte and Alfred W. Crompton. Later studies have shown that the specimen likely belongs to a cynodont more derived than Probainognathus. The specimen was sent through a CT scan at the University of Texas at Austin, and the resulting 3D model was made available to the public.

In 1994, the holotype of Probainognathus jenseni, along with several other specimens, were stolen from the National University of La Rioja in Argentina.

== Description ==
Probainognathus was a small cynodont, the apparent body size of which is inconsistent across sources, ranging from being about the size of a rat, to the size of a small dog.

=== Teeth and diet ===
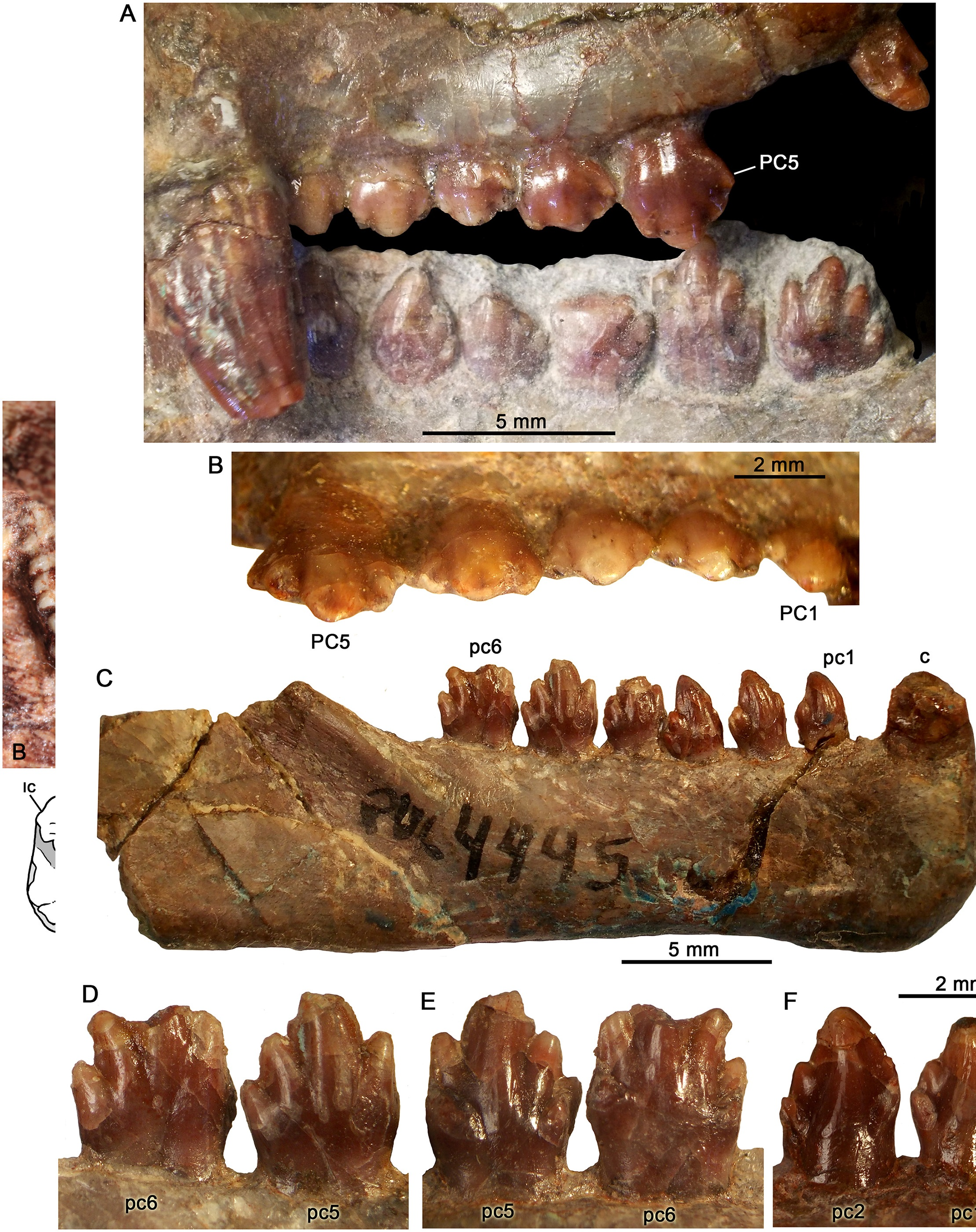
Dentition of Probainognathus jenseni

The diet of Probainognathus is thought to have been carnivorous or insectivorous, which can be extrapolated from its teeth. The teeth included dully-tipped, partially developed canines, postcanines, four upper incisors that were positioned vertically, and three lower incisors that leaned slightly forward. The cheek teeth were slender from the sides, but were lengthened anteroposteriorly, with several cusps along the row.

=== Brain ===
Based on an endocranial cast of Probainognathus, several details have been extrapolated about its brain. Probainognathus' cerebral hemispheres were elongated, it had established olfactory bulbs, and a significant cerebellum and flocculi. These were among other, less pronounced, structures such as anterior colliculi. Because of these features, it has been suggested that Probainognathus' brain had well-developed visual, auditory, motor, and body sensory systems. And, as a whole, the brain of Probainognathus indicates that it was in the process of developing endothermy.

=== Skull ===
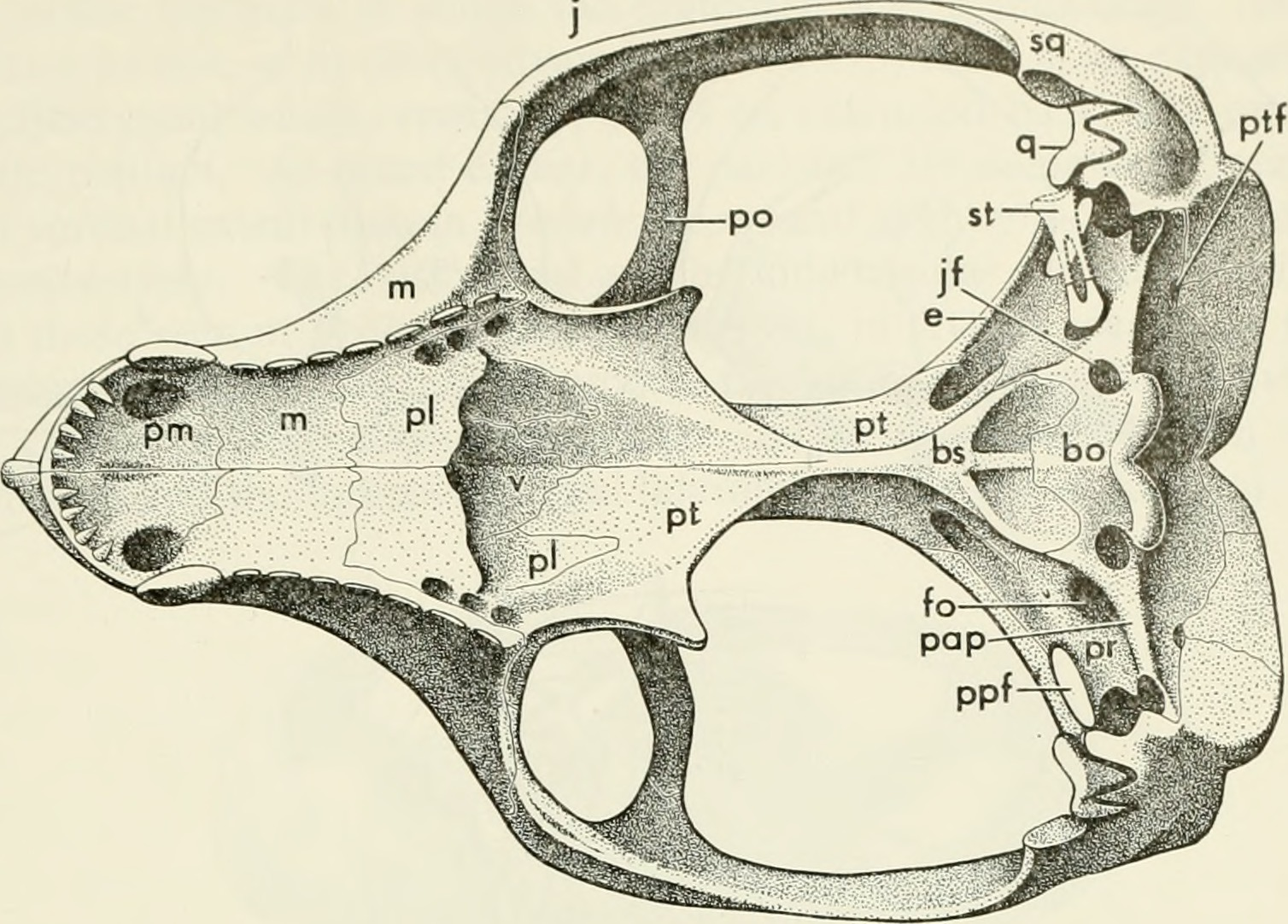
Illustration of the skull in palatal view

The snout of Probainognathus extended beyond the premaxillary processes, and was very thin. The apparent fragility of this structure has led to it being broken off several specimens, and has led to an increased difficulty in studying it. There are several features that have been identified, however. The suborbital arch and the zygomatic arch were both shaped relatively sharply, and there was an extension of the squamosal posteriorly on the zygomatic arch. Probainognathus had a long secondary palate as it stretched all the way to the posterior end of the tooth row. The secondary palate was formed largely by the palatine, and it was somewhat narrow. This narrowing of the palate allowed for the conservation of space to be able to fit the back, lower postcanine teeth. Moreover, the vomer stretched posteriorly to the secondary palate, and significant pterygoid flanges were present, as well.

The skull of Probainognathus was on average around 7 centimetres (2.8 in) in length, and lacked the pineal foramen. The skull was broad in proportion to its length, the face was short and narrow, but its zygomatic region was relatively large, seemingly for jaw muscle attachment. The skull also possessed a double occipital condyle, which is a typical mammalian feature. In comparison to close relatives, such as Chiniquodon, the braincase of Probainognathus was broader in the parietal region, and the occipital region of the skull was deeper. Likewise, the parietals had more depth, the occipital crest was higher, and the orbits were proportionately larger relative to the rest of its head. The sagittal crest was also lengthened posteriorly, and split into the occipital crests. This led to a straighter posterior margin, and a more concave occiput in Probainognathus.

=== Jaw ===
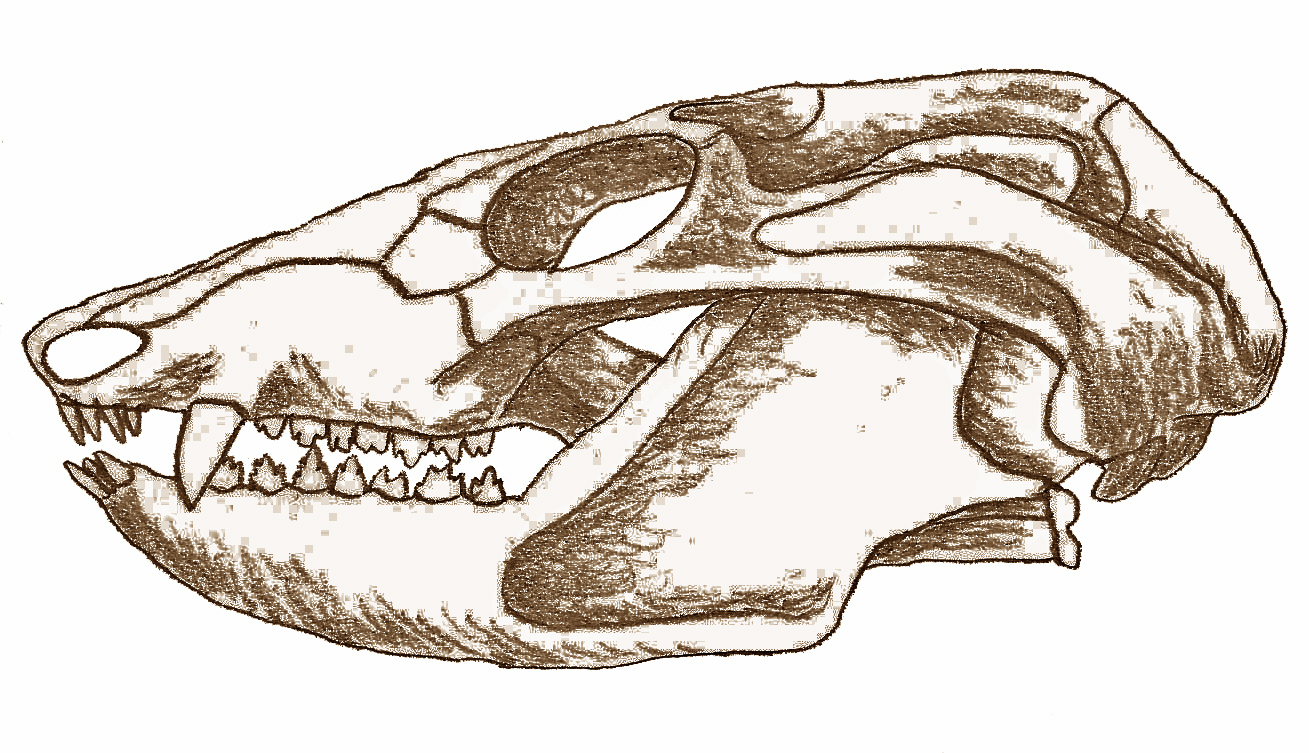
Illustration of the skull in lateral view

The jaw of Probainognathus is of particular phylogenetic importance. Morphologically, the dentary made up most of the lower jaw, and it curved and extended down posteriorly to the area of the articular and jaw articulation. Correspondingly, in the upper jaw, the squamosal bone became situated next to the quadrate. Like some other cynodonts, Probainognathus possessed a double jaw joint, as indicated by a socket (glenoid) in the squamosal bone. Romer (1970) interpreted this socket as articulating with the dentary bone of the lower jaw, as seen in modern mammals and early mammaliaforms like Morganucodon. Later studies have reinterpreted the socket as articulating with the surangular, one of the postdentary bones, instead of the dentary. Once the dentary-squamosal articulation became established, the former bones involved in jaw articulation, the articular and quadrate, could become integrated into the inner ear as the malleus and incus, respectively. This had not yet happened in the case of Probainognathus, but the reduced size of the quadrate, as well as its loose association with the squamosal and proximity to the stapes indicates the quadrate to incus process was underway.

The jaw of Probainognathus is suggested to have had mammal-like soft tissue features. The jaw muscles in Probainognathus are thought to have been positioned farther forward, with the masseter splitting into two separate muscles: the superficial masseter and the deep masseter.

== Classification ==
When Romer first described Probainognathus in 1970, he assigned it to the family Chiniquodontidae based on the animal's overall similarities with that group. In a 1973 paper, he decided that Probainognathus was distinct enough from other chiniquodontids to deserve its own family, and thus Probainognathidae was erected. In 2016, a second probainognathid, Bonacynodon, was described from Brazil. Phylogenetic analyses have generally found probainognathids to be early-diverging members of the clade Probainognathia, being closer to mammals than to the traversodontids and other cynognathians.

The cladogram below is from a 2023 paper by Stefanello et al., and shows the position of Probainognathus within Probainognathia.

- Probainognathia
  - Lumkuia
  - - Chiniquodon
    - - Probainognathidae
        - Bonacynodon
        - Probainognathus
    - - Ecteniniidae
      - - Protheriodon
        - Prozostrodontia
          - Prozostrodontidae
          - - Therioherpeton
            - - Irajatherium
              - - Riograndia
                - - - Diarthrognathus
                    - Pachygenelus
                  - - Tritylodontidae
                    - - Botucaraitherium
                      - - Brasilodon
                        - Mammaliaformes

== Paleoecology ==
Probainognathus was collected from the Chañares Formation in La Rioja Province, Argentina. This locale is known for its preservation of tetrapods, which are largely fossilized in volcanic concretions. When Probainognathus inhabited this area, it is thought to have been a lacustrine region within a rift basin that got a large influx of sedimentary debris and volcanic ash.

Various pieces of evidence suggest tetrapod mass mortality was the cause of death in the Chañares Formation. Fossils of both young and adult specimens were found at this locale, and these are not limited to Probainognathus, but rather represent many taxa that fell victim to the event. There is also an unusual concentration of herbivores, carnivores, and omnivores in this formation. Numerous fossils of each type were found in close proximity to one another, despite the fact that this intermingling would normally be uncommon. It has, subsequently, been suggested that this unusual distribution of specimens could be due to the death event leaving these animals stranded with no other place to go, perhaps along a waterfront of some kind. The evidence at hand, especially the nature of volcanic preservation, has led to the postulation that volcanism played a role in the death event in some capacity. Suggested events include a large outpouring of ash, lethal gas surges, or, more likely, volcanism-induced flooding. Volcanic activity may have caused damming or other water diversion, which led to major widespread flooding in the area, and the death of Probainognathus and other tetrapods. It remains uncertain whether volcanism was the direct cause of this major death event, or if it just aided in preservation after the fact.
