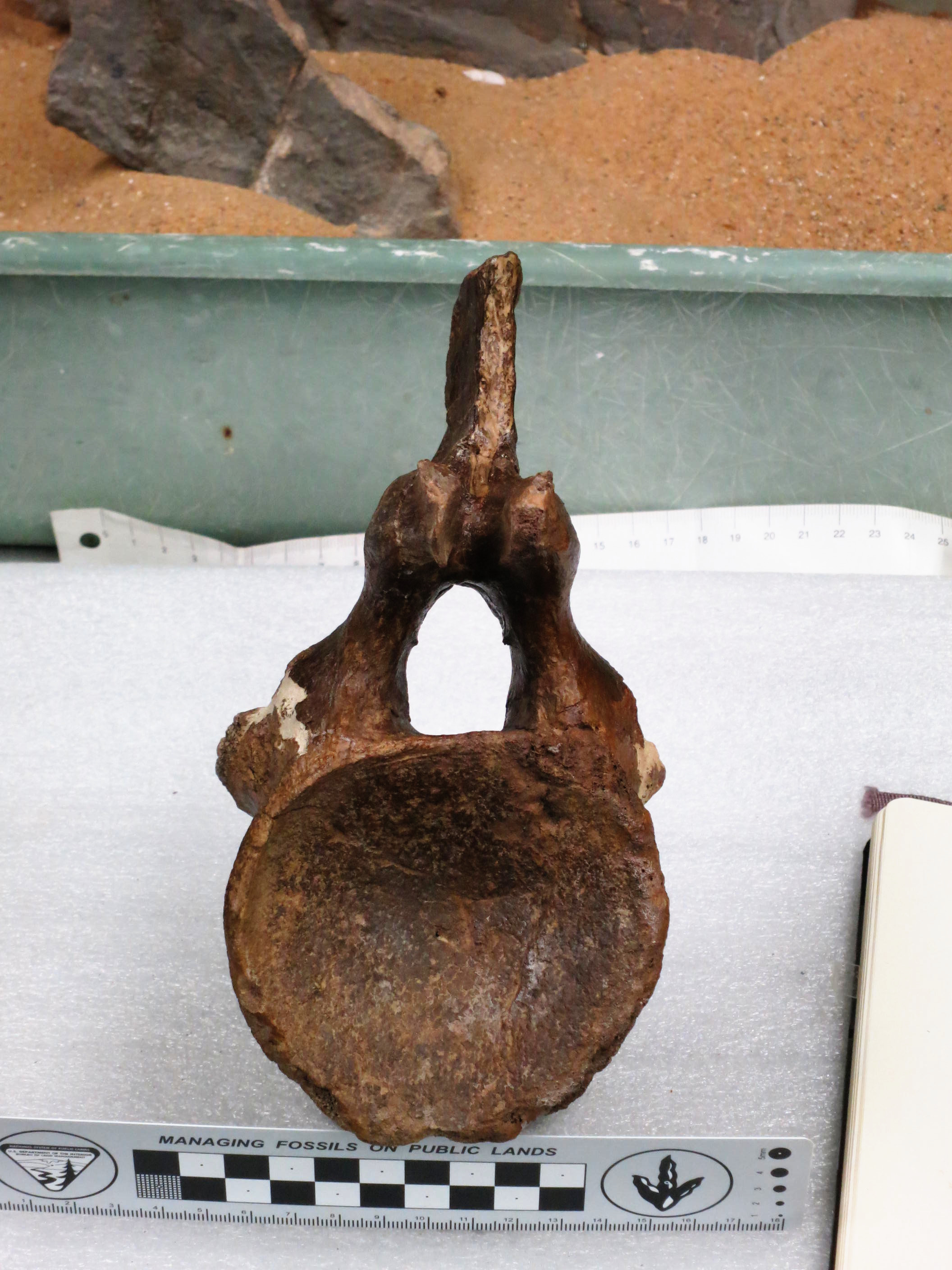
- Caudal vertebra of Astrophocaudia (SMU 61732)

Scientific classification
- Kingdom: Animalia
- Phylum: Chordata
- Class: Reptilia
- Clade: Dinosauria
- Clade: Saurischia
- Clade: †Sauropodomorpha
- Clade: †Sauropoda
- Clade: †Eusauropoda
- Clade: †Macronaria
- Clade: †Somphospondyli
- Genus: †Astrophocaudia; D’Emic, 2012

Type species
- †Astrophocaudia slaughteri D’Emic, 2012

= Astrophocaudia =

Astrophocaudia Temporal range: Early Cretaceous, Early Albian 112.2–106 Ma

Extinct genus of dinosaurs

Astrophocaudia (pronounced "as-TRO-foh-KAW-dee-ah" Greek: αστροφοκαυδία, meaning "non-twisting tail") is an extinct genus of somphospondylan sauropod known from the later part of the Early Cretaceous (Albian stage) of Texas, United States. Its remains were discovered in the Paluxy Formation. The type species is A. slaughteri, described in 2012.

== Discovery and naming ==
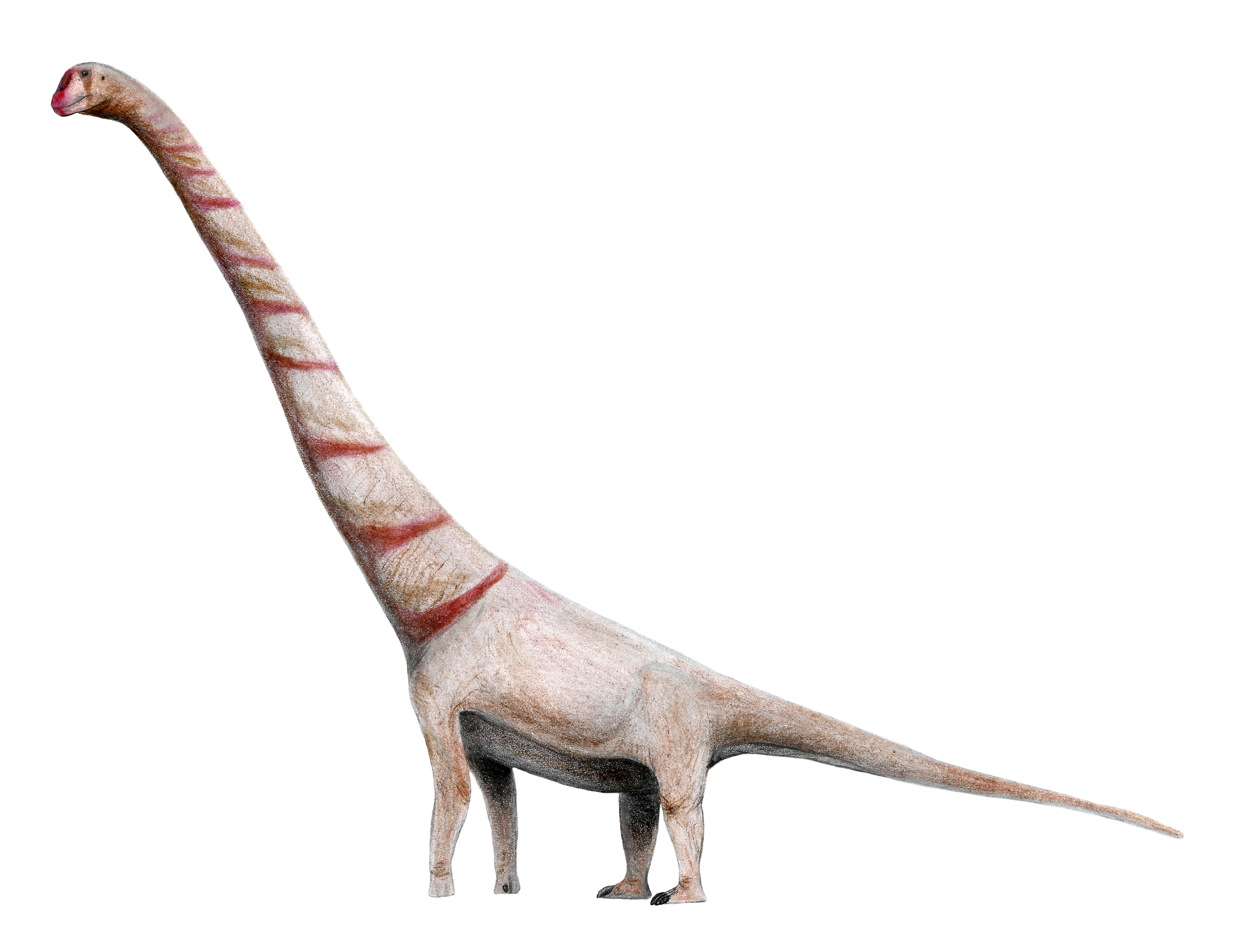
Life restoration

Fragmentary sauropod remains were among the earliest dinosaurs to be named from North America in the 19th century. In particular, the genera Astrodon and Pleurocoelus were named based on teeth and isolated limb or vertebral elements. Additional remains would be assigned to these genera over the course of the 19th century, most of which have either been reassigned to their own genera or considered to be dubious. Among the remains assigned to the genus Pleurocoelus (itself sometimes considered a junior synonym of Astrodon) were the specimens SMU 61732 and SMU 203/73655, which had been discovered and excavated from the Paluxy Formation of Texas by the paleontologist Robert Slaughter in the 1960s.

Wann Langston Jr., a paleontologist who did considerable work on fossils from Texas, assigned these specimens to "Pleurocoelus sp." in 1974, and the fossils were not fully described for several decades. The remains were re-examined by the doctoral student Michael D. D’Emic, who was studying at the University of Michigan at the time. His description included a comprehensive review of the sauropod remains from the Early Cretaceous of North America including Sauroposeidon, Cedarosaurus, Brontomerus, and others. In his description, D'Emic erected the new taxon Astrophocaudia slaughteri to contain both SMU 61732 and SMU 203/73655.

The genus name was given a twofold meaning: it is derived from several Ancient Greek words including "stropho-" meaning "twisting" or "turning", "caud-" meaning "tail", and the prefix "a-", meaning "not". The genus name as a whole therefore means "non-twisting tail", in reference to the closely-connected hyposphene-hypantrum articulation of the caudal vertebrae. The genus name can also be translated to "star tail", using the Ancient Greek word "astron" and the above mentioned "caud", meaning "tail". This second meaning is in reference to the shape of the caudal vertebrae when viewed from behind, which have the appearance of a three-pointed star. D'Emic remarks that the name has a third meaning (although not a third translation), which is to pay homage to Astrodon, the first named sauropod from North America. The species epithet "slaughteri" is in honor of Robert Slaughter, the original discoverer of the remains.

== Description ==
The holotype of Astrophocaudia consists of a single tooth (SMU 203/73655) and a partial postcranial skeleton (SMU 61732). The latter specimen contains the following elements: two cervical vertebrae, a few fragments of dorsal vertebrae, 24 caudal vertebrae, 20 rib fragments, two chevrons, part of a scapula, a partial right ilium, and several fragments that were not able to be identified. The roughly proportional size of the bones and the lack of any repeated elements led D'Emic to conclude that all of the preserved remains likely belonged to a single individual. D'Emic did not provide an estimate of the full size of Astrophocaudia in his description. Rubén Molina-Pérez and Asier Larramendi estimated the full size of this species at 10.9 m (36 ft) long and weighing 2.85 t (6,300 lb). Evan Johnson-Ransom estimated a larger size of this species at 18.3 m (60 ft) long and weighing 20 t (44,000 lb), making it comparable in size to Astrodon.

Astrophocaudia is able to be distinguished from all other sauropods by the following autapomorphies: a planar orientation of the hyposphene-hypantrum articulations relative to the zygapophyses and the presence of a lamina in front of the neural arches which contacts a second lamina between, and in front of, the zygapophyses. It is further distinguished from the roughly contemporaneous sauropods Cedarosaurus, Venenosaurus, Sauroposeidon, and Sonorasaurus by other characteristics of the caudal vertebrae. Astrophocaudia also possesses a preacetabular process which is slightly curved when viewed from above.

== Classification ==
In his description of Astrophocaudia, D'Emic conducted a phylogenetic analysis which included all known sauropods from the Early Cretaceous of North America. He notably found that fossils of the taxon Paluxysaurus bore autapomorphies of Sauroposeidon, meaning the two taxa were synonymous. He found that Astrophocaudia belonged in a polytomy at the base of Somphospondyli outside of Titanosauria. An abbreviated version of the cladogram published by D'Emic is shown below next to another, more recent analysis that recovered similar results with greater resolution by Yang, Han, and colleagues.

D'Emic, 2012

- Macronaria
  - Camarasaurus
  - - Tehuelchesaurus
    - Titanosauriformes
      - Brachiosauridae
      - Somphospondyli
        - Ligabuesaurus
        - - Astrophocaudia
          - Chubutisaurus
          - Euhelopus
          - Phuwiangosaurus
          - Sauroposeidon
          - Tastavinsaurus
          - Titanosauria

Han et al., 2024

- Somphospondyli
  - Unnamed clade
    - Astrophocaudia
    - - Brontomerus
      - Malarguesaurus
      - Sauroposeidon
  - - - - Europatitan
        - Tastavinsaurus
      - - Fukuititan
        - - Dongbeititan
          - Ligabuesaurus
        - - Angolatitan
          - - Chubutisaurus
            - Cloverly titanosauriform
    - - Euhelopodidae
      - Titanosauria

== See also ==
- 2012 in archosaur paleontology
- List of fossiliferous stratigraphic units in Texas
- List of North American dinosaurs
- List of sauropod species
- List of sauropodomorph type specimens
- List of the prehistoric life of Texas
