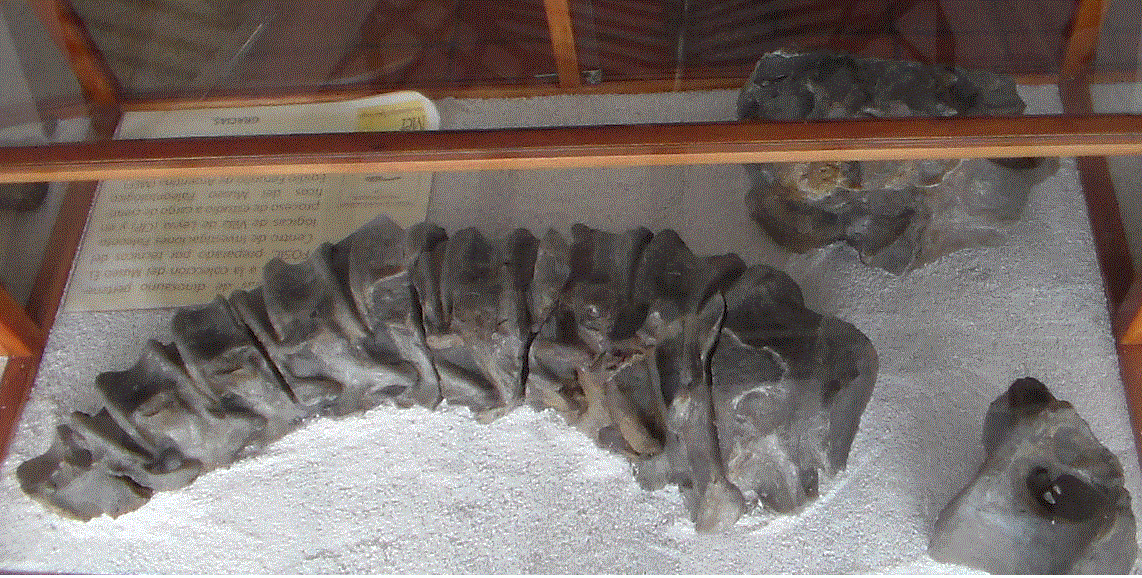
- Vertebrae of holotype JACVM 0001

Scientific classification
- Kingdom: Animalia
- Phylum: Chordata
- Class: Reptilia
- Clade: Dinosauria
- Clade: Saurischia
- Clade: †Sauropodomorpha
- Clade: †Sauropoda
- Clade: †Macronaria
- Clade: †Titanosauriformes
- Genus: †Padillasaurus; Carballido et al., 2015

Type species
- †Padillasaurus leivaensis Carballido et al., 2015

= Padillasaurus =

Padillasaurus Temporal range: Early Cretaceous, Barremian

Extinct genus of reptiles

Padillasaurus is an extinct genus of titanosauriform sauropod known from the Early Cretaceous (Barremian stage) Paja Formation in Colombia. It contains a single species, Padillasaurus leivaensis, known only from a single partial axial skeleton. Initially described as a brachiosaurid, it was considered to be the first South American brachiosaurid ever discovered and named. Before its discovery, the only known brachiosaurid material on the continent was very fragmentary and from the Jurassic period. However, a more recent study finds it to be a basal somphospondylan.

== Discovery ==
The fossil was discovered by local farmers in a limestone nodule during the 1990s in Ricaurte, northeast of Villa de Leyva. The exact site of the find is unknown, however the rock matrix in which the fossil was located contains ammonite fossils bellowing to the species Gerhardtia galeatoides and Lytoceras sp., that allow the establishment of their origin in the middle Paja Formation which has been placed in the late Barremian, around 130 million years old. The fossil consists of vertebrae from the torso, sacrum and tail: all presumed to be from one individual. This specimen is the holotype assigned to the catalogue number JACVM 0001; this includes a rear dorsal vertebra, a series from the last two sacral vertebrae and first eight caudal vertebrae (these caudal vertebrae were found without their chevrons). The sacral vertebrae have been identified as the fourth and fifth. This fossil was donated by the farmers and became part of the collection at the museum of the Junta de Acción Comunal de la Vereda de Monquirá. Padillasaurus was originally described and named by José L. Carballido, Diego Pol, Mary L. Parra Ruge, Santiago Padilla Bernal, María E. Páramo-Fonseca y Fernando Etayo-Serna in 2015. The name of the genus pays homage to Carlos Bernardo Padilla, the founder of the Centro de Investigaciones Paleontológicas in Villa de Leyva, Colombia. The specific name, leivaensis, is named after Villa de Leyva, which is located nearby to where the vertebrae of the holotype specimen were discovered.

Padillasaurus is the first record of a Cretaceous brachiosaurid of South America; previous findings of that time were only known in North America. Although fragmentary remains of possible brachiosaurids are known from the Jurassic of Patagonia in Argentina, Padillasaurus it is the first member officially named from South America. It is also the latest brachiosaurid known from the ancient continent of Gondwana.

== Description ==
Padillasaurus was a medium-sized titanosauriform. Because of the few remains found it is difficult to determine what would have been its body size, but it may have been between 16–18 metres (52–59 ft) long and weighed about 10 tonnes (11 short tons).

Padillasaurus is distinguished from other titanosauriforms in having its caudal vertebrae weakly expanded to the sides, and displaying divided side projections. The species shows some typical basic features of Titanosauriformes: the vertebra is opisthocoelic, with a convex front section and the back concave. The edges show large pleurocoels, pneumatic processes that connected to the hollow interior of the body of the vertebra, which consisted of several hollow cavities. The spine also had an additional lamina between the diapophysis and the body of the vertebra. The anterior caudal vertebrae are flattened or slightly concave from the front and from behind, or vice versa. The neural arches are positioned relatively forward. These have long ridges that run between the protuberances of the joint face and body of the vertebra. The side projections are oriented obliquely backwards and have a convex lower area. The caudal vertebrae have a height equal to half of its width.

== Phylogeny ==
Padillasaurus was initially classified in the family Brachiosauridae based on its morphology. It had cavities in the sacral vertebrae that had no connection with the hollow interior of the vertebra, therefore lacking a true pleurocoel. This feature links it to the brachiosaurids. A cladistic analysis was unable to determine the exact relationships of Padillasaurus with other genera, finding a polytomy among basal forms including Padillasaurus, Abydosaurus, Brachiosaurus and Giraffatitan, while Cedarosaurus and Venenosaurus were occasionally recovered as sister taxa. Unlike Cretaceous brachiosaurids from North America, in which the spinous process of the caudal vertebrae leaned slightly forward, those of Padillasaurus were angled rearward.

Cladogram from Carballido et al., 2015:

- Brachiosauridae
  - Padillasaurus
  - Brachiosaurus
  - Abydosaurus
  - Giraffatitan
  - - Venenosaurus
    - Cedarosaurus

In 2017, a study concluded that Padillasaurus was not a brachiosaurid but a basal member of the Somphospondyli.
