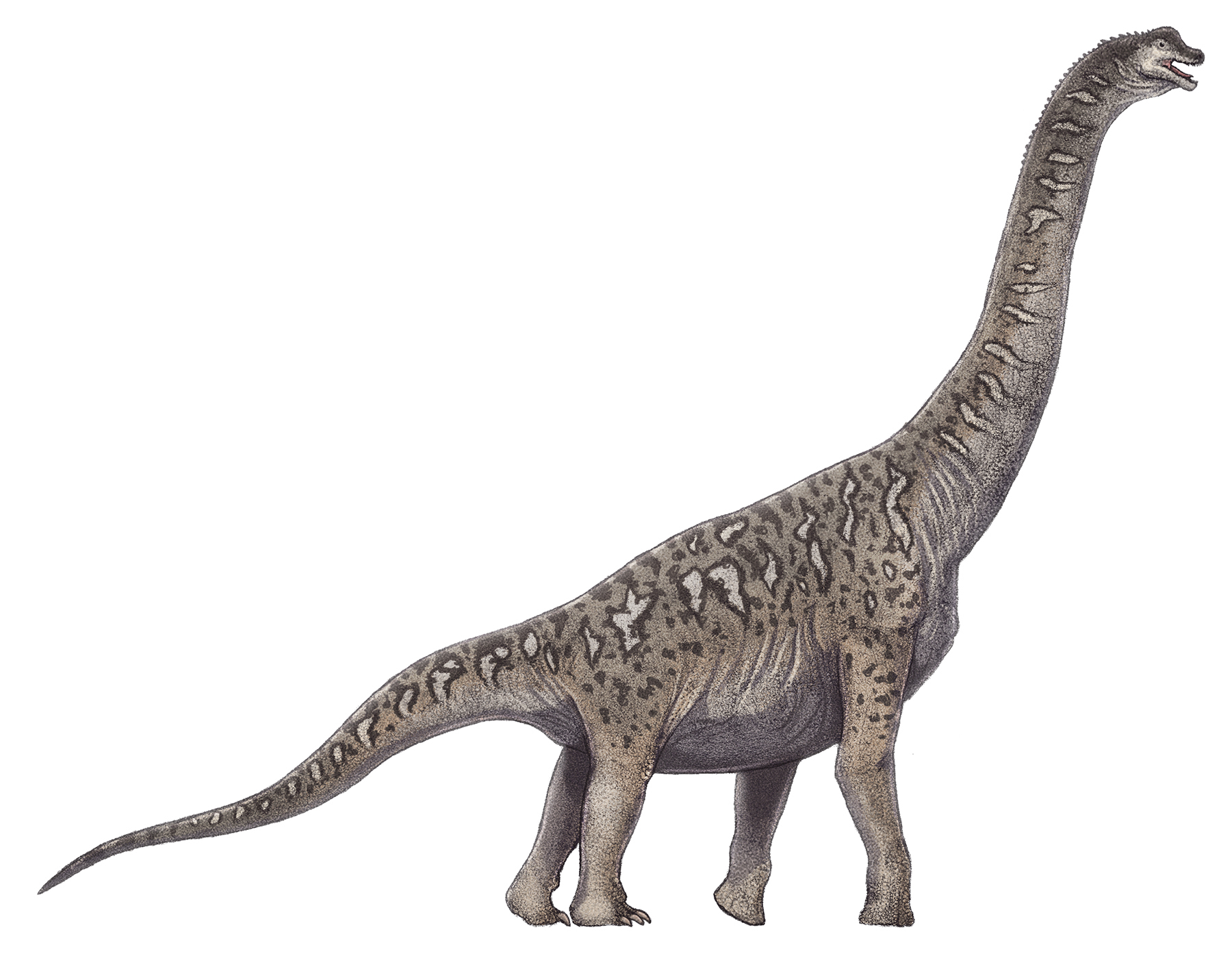
- Life restoration of Soriatitan golmayensis

Scientific classification
- Domain: Eukaryota
- Kingdom: Animalia
- Phylum: Chordata
- Clade: Dinosauria
- Clade: Saurischia
- Clade: †Sauropodomorpha
- Clade: †Sauropoda
- Clade: †Macronaria
- Family: †Brachiosauridae
- Genus: †Soriatitan; Royo-Torres et al., 2017

Type species
- †Soriatitan golmayensis Royo-Torres et al., 2017

= Soriatitan =

Soriatitan Temporal range: Early Cretaceous, 130–125 Ma

Extinct genus of reptiles

Soriatitan ("Soria titan") is a genus of brachiosaurid sauropod from the Early Cretaceous of Spain. It is known from one species, S. golmayensis, found in the Golmayo Formation. It lived between 130 and 125 million years ago, and was identified by a team of paleontologists in Spain.

== Discovery and naming ==
The only known specimen of Soriatitan, S. golmayensis, was discovered in the Golmayo Formation (upper Hauterivian–lower Barremian) in Soria province, Spain. The material was found in the Zorralbo 1 deposit located in the vicinity of the population of Golmayo. Excavation began in 2000 by a team of paleontologists from the province of Soria, and preparation began in 2009, aided by the Dinópolis Foundation.

== Description ==
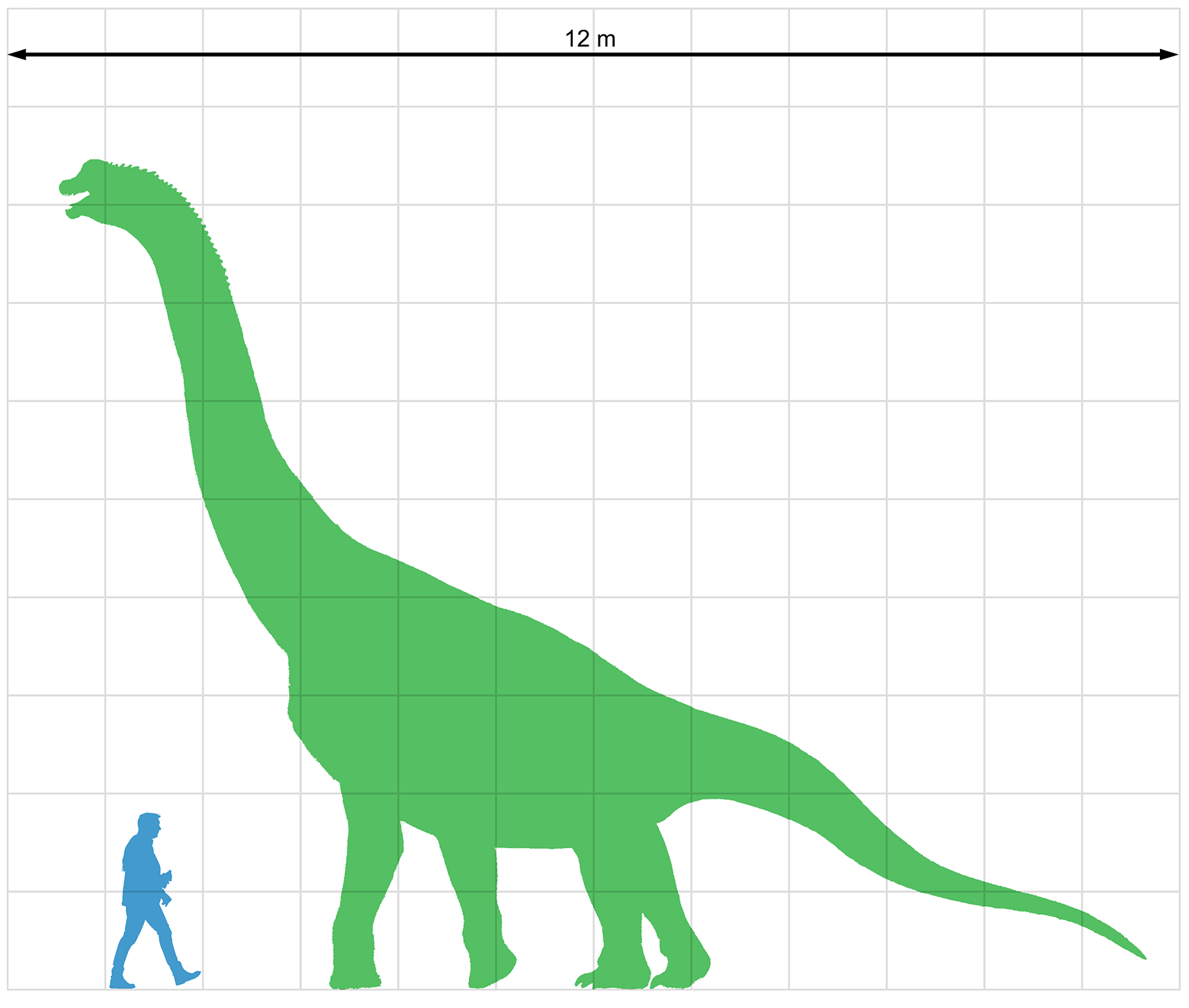
Size of Soriatitan golmayensis compared to a human

The known material of S. golmayensis (MNS 2001/122) consists of one tooth, three dorsal vertebrae with ribs, a partial sacrum, five caudal centra, two caudal vertebral spines, one chevron, a humerus, an ulna, a radius, two partial ilia, two ischia, a fragment of a pubis, and a partial femur. It is estimated to have been 43–46 feet long (13–14 meters) and had an estimated weight of about 8 tons.

Cladistic analysis has identified the known material as belonging to Brachiosauridae within Titanosauriformes. The known material shares similar characteristics with both European and North American brachiosaurids. It has similar anteriorly deflected anterior–middle caudal neural spines to Cedarosaurus, Tastavinsaurus, and Venenosaurus, and a proximodistally straight lateral margin between the proximal head and the humerus shaft with Cedarosaurus. The specimen was an adult with small 0.7 inch (18mm) teeth that indicates it was, like all other sauropods, a grazer. Fossilized remains of plants that lived at the same time as Soriatitan indicate that it lived in a subtropical climate in a landscape dominated by conifer trees, which would have been its main food source.

The discovery of S. golmayensis, indicates that there was a presence of Early Cretaceous brachiosaurids in both North America and Europe, supporting the hypothesis of a connection between the tectonic plates of these continents at some point during the Early Cretaceous. S. golmayensis is the only known brachiosaurid described from the Early Cretaceous of Europe. Until this discovery, it was thought that brachiosaurids had become extinct in Europe around 130 million years ago.

== See also ==
- 2017 in archosaur paleontology
