= John Stanton McIntosh =

American paleontologist

John McIntosh
- Born: January 6, 1923; Ford City, Pennsylvania
- Died: July 16, 2015 (aged 92); Middletown, Connecticut
- Education: Yale (BS), (MS), (PhD)
- Known for: Research on sauropods
- Scientific career
- Fields: Physics, Paleontology

John Stanton "Jack" McIntosh (1923 - 2015) was an American physicist and paleontologist who heavily influenced the study of sauropods. McIntosh worked professionally as a physicist at Wesleyan University until retirement in 1998, pursuing the study of sauropods during and after.

== Early life and education ==
McIntosh was born in Ford City, Pennsylvania on 1923, and grew up attending school in Pittsburgh. At the age of five or six his father took him to the Carnegie Museum, where his awe at the Diplodocus and Camarasaurus skeletons sparked his interest in sauropods. Suffering from childhood illness, McIntosh was given a copy of Organic Evolution by paleontologist Richard Lull who taught ay Yale University. This prompted McIntosh, who was 13 or 14, to write a letter to Lull asking about the identities of the sauropods Cardiodon, Cetiosaurus, and Apatosaurus. Lull replied redirecting McIntosh to ask Charles W. Gilmore instead.

Following high school graduation in 1941, McIntosh started studying physics at Yale University. He visited the Yale Peabody Museum, and asked then-curator Ed Lewis if he could work on dinosaurs. Lewis tasked McIntosh with repairing a damaged neck vertebra of Apatosaurus mounted by Othniel Charles Marsh. Fir his first year at college, McIntosh worked in one of the dinosaur halls at the museum; for his second year he was employed putting damaged bones back together. During this second year, McIntosh met Barnum Brown while repairing a femur of Coelurus, who excitedly invited McIntosh to the American Museum of Natural History where he was working on a very similar bone. Brown showed McIntosh the bones he was working on, which he referred to as "Daptosaurus" and "Microdontosaurus". Brown retired soon after, but the specimens he and McIntosh drew and measured were named Deinonychus and Microvenator by his successor John Ostrom.

=== Military service ===
Around when McIntosh turned 19, the US entered World War II, and as part of the Greatest Generation he was enlisted into the military. Having finished two years of college, McIntosh was sent to learn meteorology and radar as part of the US Army Air Corps at Brown University, MIT, and Harvard. While at Harvard, he visited the Museum of Comparative Zoology and met Alfred Sherwood Romer, who was reading papers by Chinese paleontologist C.C. Young on prosauropods he was researching. A month into his third year of college, McIntosh was called up by the Air Corps and sent over Guam as a flight weather officer in a B-29, also completing 21 or 22 missions over Japan. Flying in weather planes at altitudes around 32,000 feet (9.8 km), these missions were never badly damaged by Japanese fire, with only rare engine failure leading to landing on Iwo Jima for maintenance. McIntosh's last mission was on Victory over Japan Day.

In the aftermath of the Japanese surrender, McIntosh was in Oklahoma City for discharge, when he took a trip to visit paleontologists J. Willis Stovall and Wann Langston Jr. After getting discharged, he returned to Yale to complete his degree in physics. McIntosh took physics formally as it was believed at the time that dinosaur paleontology was not the field for a career. He completed his Bachelor of Science in 1949, his Master of Science in 1949, and his Doctor of Philosophy in 1952, all at Yale.

== Career and research ==
McIntosh did not have any overlapping interests between physics and paleontology, but continued to pursue both upon graduation. As his PhD was focused on nuclear physics, McIntosh joined the theoretical physics group Project Matterhorn at Princeton University led by Archibald Wheeler that worked in developing the first H-bomb. After the completion of this project in 1953, he remained at Princeton as an associate professor, later moving to become chair of the Wesleyan University Physics Department in Middletown, Connecticut where he worked until his retirement in 1998. During this time as a professional physicist, McIntosh continued to study and research sauropods, publishing books on the history of the dinosaur collections by Marsh (with Ostrom), the field journals of collector Arthur Lakes (with Michael Kohl), and a bibliography of dinosaurs (with Dan Chure). In the 1960s he visited Museo de La Plata in Argentina to organize the collections, as well as publishing a catalogue of all the dinosaur specimens at the Carnegie Museum. Some of his most influential works are the identification of the proper skull of Apatosaurus, and the chapter of The Dinosauria on sauropods, which was the definitive review of the group.

Two valid sauropods have been named after McIntosh, the brachiosaurid Abydosaurus mcintoshi, and the macronarian Brontomerus mcintoshi. Ultrasaurus macintoshi is also named after McIntosh, but is considered a synonym of Supersaurus. The 2005 book The Sauropods: Evolution and Paleobiology was dedicated to McIntosh for his work on the group, and featured two interviews by the editors of McIntosh about his life and his work.

=== Publications ===
- McIntosh, J.S. (1965). "Marsh and the dinosaurs". Discovery: Magazine of the Peabody Museum of Natural History. 1 (1). Yale University: 31–37.
- Ostrom, J.H.; McIntosh, J.S. (1966). Marsh's Dinosaurs: The Collections from Como Bluff. Yale University Press. p. 388.
- McIntosh, J.S.; Berman, D.S. (1975). "Description of the palate and lower jaw of the sauropod dinosaur Diplodocus (Reptilia: Saurischia) with remarks on the nature of the skull of Apatosaurus". Journal of Paleontology. 49: 187–199.
- McIntosh, J.S. (1977). Dinosaur National Monument. Constellation Phoenix. p. 33.
- Berman, D.S.; McIntosh, J.S. (1978). "Skull and relationships of the Upper Jurassic sauropod Apatosaurus (Reptilia, Saurischia)". Bulletin of Carnegie Museum of Natural History. 8: 1–3. doi:10.5962/p.228587.
- Dodson, P.; Behrensmeyer, A.K.; Bakker, R.T.; McIntosh, J.S. (1980). "Taphonomy and Paleoecology of the Dinosaur Beds of the Jurassic Morrison Formation". Paleobiology. 6 (2): 208–232. Bibcode:1980Pbio....6..208D. doi:10.1017/S009483730000676X.
- Russell, D.A.; Béland, P.; McIntosh, J.S. (1980). "Paleoecology of the dinosaurs of Tendaguru (Tanzania)". Mémoires de la Société Géologique de France. Nouvelle Série. 59 (139): 169–176.
- McIntosh, J.S. (1981). "Annotated catalogue of the dinosaurs (Reptilia, Archosauria) in the collections of Carnegie Museum of Natural History". Bulletin of Carnegie Museum of Natural History. 18: 1–64. doi:10.5962/p.228597.
- Mateer, N.J.; McIntosh, J.S. (1985). "A new reconstruction of the skull of Euhelopus zdanyski (Saurischia: Sauropoda)". Bulletin of the Geological Institutions of the University of Uppsala. New Series. 11: 125–132.
- Berman, D.S.; McIntosh, J.S. (1986). "Description of the lower jaw of Stegosaurus (Reptilia: Ornithischia)". Annals of the Carnegie Museum. 55 (2): 29–40. Bibcode:1986AnCM...55...29B. doi:10.5962/p.330593.
- Raath, M.A.; McIntosh, J.S. (1987). "Sauropod dinosaurs from the central Zambezi River Valley, Zimbabwe and the age of the Kadsi Formation". South African Journal of Geology. 90 (2): 107–119.
- McIntosh, J.S.; Williams, M.E. (1988). "A new species of sauropod dinosaur, Haplocanthosaurus delfsi sp. nov., from the Upper Jurassic Morrison Fm. of Colorado". Kirtlandia. 43: 3–26.
- Chure, D.J.; McIntosh, J.S. (1989). A bibliography of the Dinosauria (exclusive of the Aves) 1677-1986. Vol. 1. Museum of Western Colorado Paleontology Series. pp. 1–226.
- McIntosh, J.S. (1990). "Sauropoda". In Weishampel, D.B.; Osmólska, H.; Dodson, P. (eds.). The Dinosauria. University of California Press. pp. 345–401. ISBN 0-520-06727-4.
- McIntosh, J.S. (1990). "Species determination in sauropod dinosaurs with tentative suggestions for their classification". In Carpenter, K.; Currie, P.J. (eds.). Dinosaur systematics: Approaches and Perspectives. Cambridge University Press. pp. 53–69. ISBN 0-521-36672-0.
- McIntosh, J.S.; Coombs, W.P.; Russell, D.A. (1992). "A new diplodocid sauropod (Dinosauria) from Wyoming, U.S.A.". Journal of Vertebrate Paleontology. 12 (2): 158–167. Bibcode:1992JVPal..12..158M. doi:10.1080/02724634.1992.10011446.
- Madsen, J.A.; McIntosh, J.S.; Berman, D.S. (1995). "Skull and Atlas-Axis complex of the Upper Jurassic sauropod Camarasaurus Cope (Reptilia: Saurischia)". Bulletin of Carnegie Museum of Natural History. 31: 1–115. doi:10.5962/p.240778.
- McIntosh, J.S.; Miller, W.E.; Stadtman, K.L.; Gillette, D.D. (1996). "The osteology of Camarasaurus lewisi (Jensen, 1988)". BYU Geology Studies. 41: 73–115. Bibcode:1996BYUGS..41...73M.
- Kohl, M.F.; McIntosh, J.S. (1997). Discovering Dinosaurs in the Old West: The Field Journals of Arthur Lakes. Smithsonian. p. 198. ISBN 978-1560987000.
- Ostrom, J.H.; McIntosh, J.S. (1999). Marsh's Dinosaurs: The Collections from Como Bluff (2nd ed.). Yale University Press. p. 388. ISBN 0300082088.
- McIntosh, J.S. (2005). "The Genus Barosaurus Marsh (Sauropoda, Diplodocidae)". In Tidwell, V.; Carpenter, K. (eds.). Thunder Lizards: the Sauropodomorph Dinosaurs. Indiana University Press. pp. 38–77. ISBN 0-253-34542-1.
