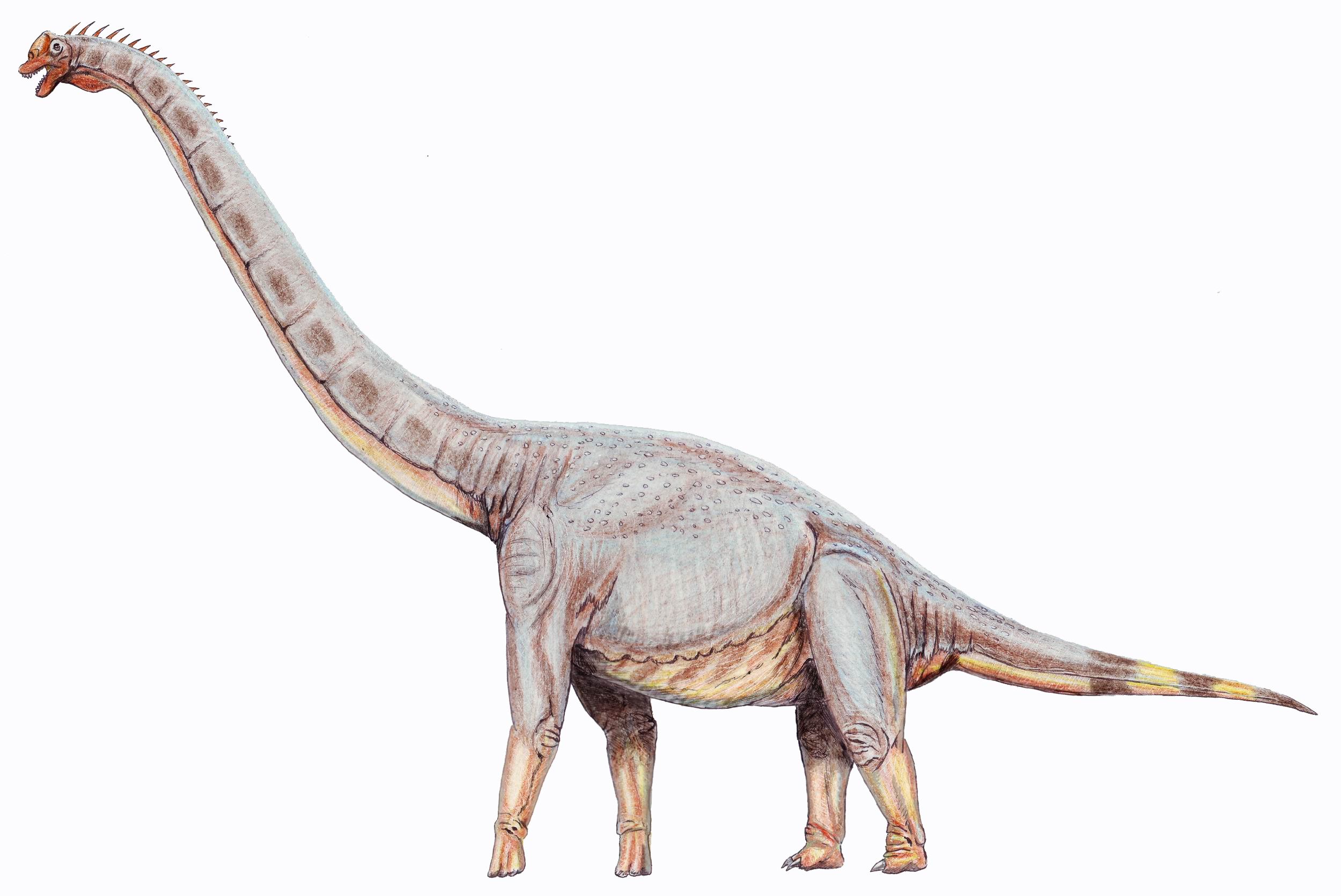
- Speculative life restoration

Scientific classification
- Kingdom: Animalia
- Phylum: Chordata
- Class: Reptilia
- Clade: Dinosauria
- Clade: Saurischia
- Clade: †Sauropodomorpha
- Clade: †Sauropoda
- Clade: †Eusauropoda
- Clade: †Macronaria
- Family: †Brachiosauridae
- Genus: †Sonorasaurus; Ratkevich, 1998
- Species: †S. thompsoni

Binomial name
- †Sonorasaurus thompsoni Ratkevich, 1998

= Sonorasaurus =

Sonorasaurus Temporal range: Early-Late Cretaceous, Albian–Cenomanian

Extinct genus of dinosaurs

Sonorasaurus is a genus of brachiosaurid sauropod dinosaur from the Early to Late Cretaceous (Albian to Cenomanian stages, around 112 to 93 million years ago). Its fossils have been found in southern Arizona, United States. Its name, which means "Sonora lizard", comes from the Sonora River that flows in the Sonoran Desert where its fossils were first found. The type species is S. thompsoni, described by Ratkevich in 1998, it weighed around 16 tons when fully grown, it was estimated to be around 15 metres (49 feet) long and 8 metres (27 feet) tall.

== Discovery ==
Fossilized remains were discovered in November 1994 by geology student Richard Thompson in the Turney Ranch Formation in the Whetstone Mountains, located in the Chihuahua Desert region of the Sonoran Desert in southern Arizona. Thompson had investigated a previously almost unexplored region, where fossils proved to be plentiful and directly accessible on the surface. A relatively complete sauropod skeleton was weathering out on a rock wall. He informed paleontologist Ronald Paul Ratkevich of the Arizona-Sonora Desert Museum, Tucson of the find. Ratkevich assembled a team of volunteers and began securing the bones in the spring of 1995; excavations would only end in 1999. He assumed the fossils represented a sauropod but was no expert on that taxon. The curator of geology of the museum, David W. Thayer, thought it might be a therizinosaur, mistaking a tail chevron bone for the long hand claw typical of that group. In 1995, Ratkevich and Tayer first reported the find, already using the name "Sonorasaurus" but informally, so that it remained a nomen nudum.

Both men now asked dinosaur expert Edwin Harris Colbert to identify the animal. Colbert, having seen only pictures, suggested it might be a member of the Hadrosauridae. Ratkevich and Thayer then visited the displays in the American Museum of Natural History, concluding their find was rather dissimilar to the hadrosaurid skeletons shown there, so that it must represent a species new to science. Ratkevich considered naming it "Chihuahuasaurus" but ultimately shied away from the comical contrast between the gigantic sauropod and the minute dog breed. In 1996, a subsequent article tried to fit the bones found, in a diagram of the hadrosaurid Kritosaurus. This attempt largely failed, with an ilium being mistaken for a shoulder blade. Again, the name "Sonorasaurus" was used but still invalidly.

Sonorasaurus was finally formally described in 1998 by Ratkevich, who identified it as a brachiosaurid sauropod. Dating of the specimen found it to be the earliest known brachiosaurid to have lived in the 'middle' Cretaceous Period of North America. On April 10, 2018, Sonorasaurus was declared the state dinosaur of Arizona after 11-year old Jax Weldon sent a letter to Arizona governor Doug Ducey

== Description ==
The holotype of Sonorasaurus, ASDM 500, is an incomplete skeleton consisting of various postcranial elements, many of which are fragmentary. A complete dorsal rib from the same horizon, ASDM 807, may also be referrable to S. thompsoni. Sonorasaurus is estimated to have been about 15 meters (49 feet) long, 8 meters (26 feet) tall, and weighed 10 metric tons (11 short tons), which is about one third of the size of Brachiosaurus.

== Classification ==
Ratkevich initially identified Sonorasaurus as a brachiosaurid. However phylogenetic studies in the following years failed to find a consensus, with some finding it to lie within Brachiosauridae and others outside of it. In no analysis was the recovered phylogenetic position of Sonorasaurus strongly supported until D'Emic et al. (2016), which found Sonorasaurus to fall confidently within the Brachiosauridae. However the authors noted that additional data was still required to firmly establish its lower-level affinities.

Sonorasaurus in a cladogram of Brachiosauridae after Mannion et al. (2017).

- Brachiosauridae
  - Europasaurus
  - - Vouivria
    - - Brachiosaurus
      - - - Giraffatitan
          - Sonorasaurus
        - - Lusotitan
          - - Cedarosaurus
            - Venenosaurus

In Mannion et al. (2019) it is still described as a brachiosaurid.
