= Turney Ranch Formation =

Geologic formation in the United States

- Stratigraphic range: Albian–Cenomanian
- Type: Geological formation

Location
- Region: Arizona
- Country: USA

The Turney Ranch Formation is a mid-Cretaceous geological formation in the United States. Dinosaur remains diagnostic to the genus level are among the fossils that have been recovered from the formation.

== Fossil content ==
Color key: Taxon / Reclassified taxon / Taxon falsely reported as present / Dubious taxon or junior synonym / Ichnotaxon / Ootaxon / Morphotaxon	Notes; Uncertain or tentative taxa are in small text; ~~crossed out~~ taxa are discredited.

=== Dinosaurs ===
==== Sauropod ====
Sauropods of the Turney Ranch Formation
Genus	Species	Location	Stratigraphic position	Material	Notes	Images
Sonorasaurus	S. thompsoni	Whetstone Mountains of southeastern Arizona		A partial skeleton	A brachiosaurid sauropod	

==== Theropods ====
Theropods of the Turney Ranch Formation
Genus	Species	Location	Stratigraphic position	Material	Notes	Images
Acrocanthosaurus	A. atokensis			Teeth	A carcharodontosaurid theropod	

== See also ==
- List of dinosaur-bearing rock formations
  - List of stratigraphic units with few dinosaur genera
