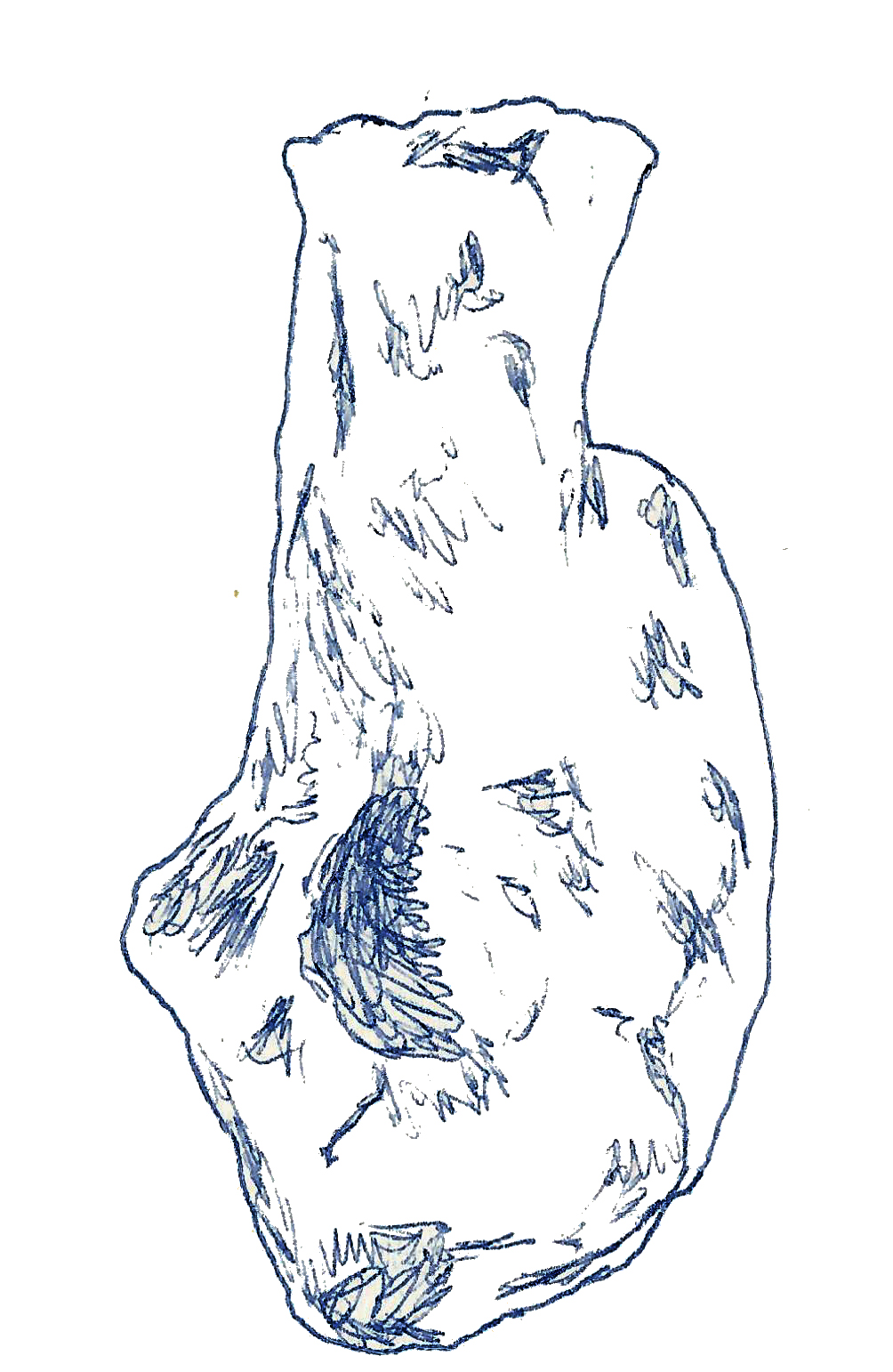
- Drawing of the scapula

Scientific classification
- Kingdom: Animalia
- Phylum: Chordata
- Class: Reptilia
- Clade: Dinosauria
- Clade: Saurischia
- Clade: †Sauropodomorpha
- Clade: †Sauropoda
- Clade: †Eusauropoda
- Clade: †Macronaria
- Clade: †Somphospondyli
- Genus: †Chubutisaurus del Corro, 1975

Type species
- †Chubutisaurus insignis del Corro, 1975

= Chubutisaurus =

Chubutisaurus Temporal range: Cenomanian 100–98 Ma

Extinct genus of dinosaurs

Chubutisaurus (meaning "Chubut lizard") is a genus of somphospondylan sauropod dinosaur from the Late Cretaceous (Cenomanian) Cerro Barcino Formation of Argentina. The type species, Chubutisaurus insignis, was described by del Corro in 1975. Chubutisaurus had a more robust radius than Venenosaurus. In 2010 Gregory S. Paul gave a length of 18 metres (59 ft) and a weight of 12 tonnes (13 short tons). Thomas Holtz estimated its length at 23 metres (75 ft) in 2012.

== Discovery and history ==
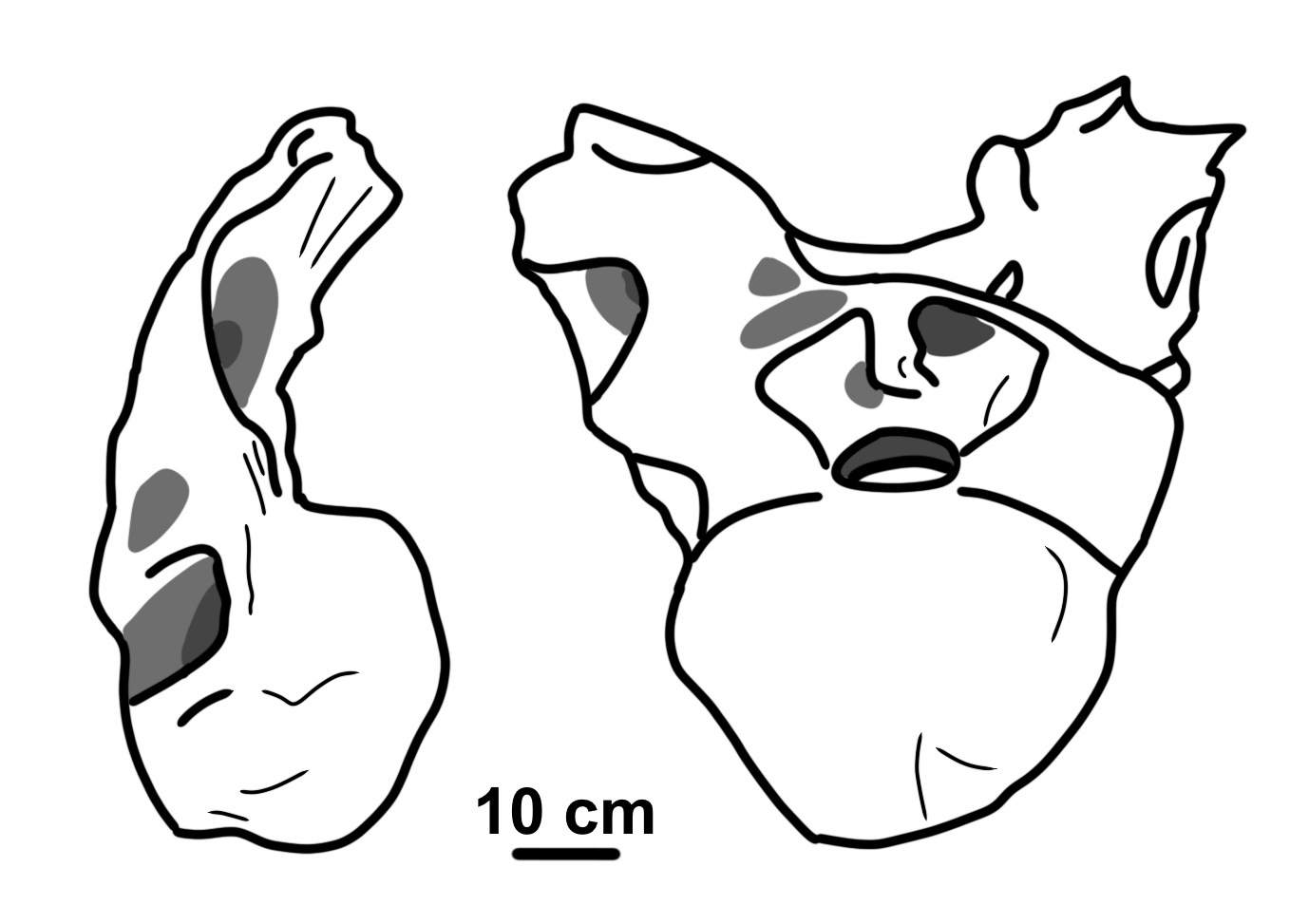
Dorsal vertebra in anterior (right) and lateral (left) views

Fossils of Chubutisaurus were first discovered in 1961 by Mr. Martinez, a local farmer near El Escorial village in Chubut Province, Patagonia in central Argentina. In 1965, these fossils were collected by paleontologist Guillermo del Corro through the use of dynamite and then cataloged at the Museo Argentino de Ciencias Naturales under MACN 18222. The strata these fossils derive from corresponds to the Bayo Overo Member of the Cerro Barcino Formation, which dates to the Cenomanian age (100-98 mya) of the early Late Cretaceous period. In 1975, del Corro scientifically described the remains and assigned them to a new genus and species of sauropod, which he named Chubutisaurus insignis. The generic name Chubutisaurus derives from Chubut, the province the fossils were found in, and the Latin root "sauros" meaning "lizard", a common suffix for dinosaur names. The specific name insignis comes from the Latin "insignis" meaning "remarkable".

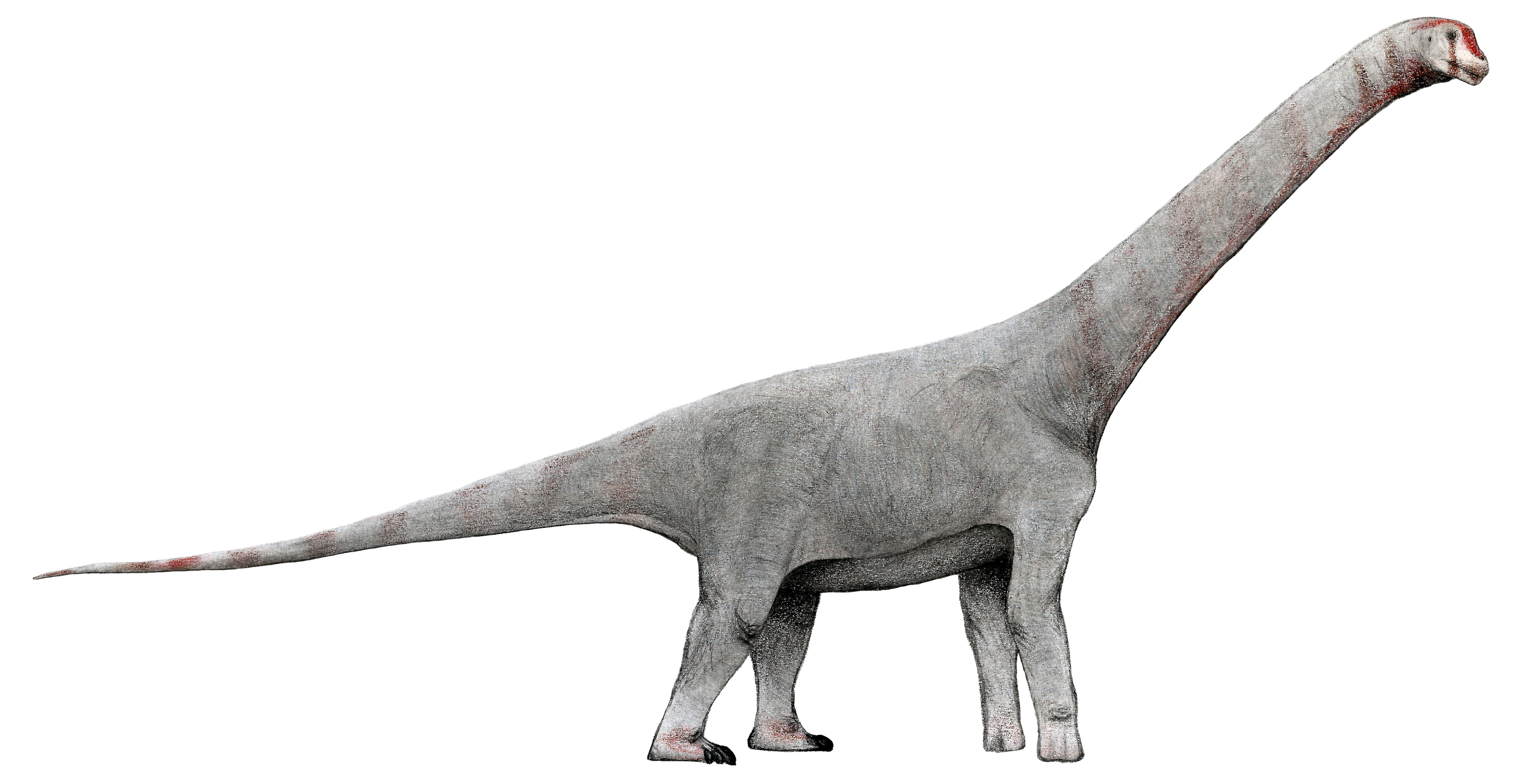
Life restoration

The holotype (name-bearing) specimen of Chubutisaurus comes from a single incomplete and disarticulated individual which was unearthed over several expeditions. The remains initially collected in 1965 included fragments of dorsal (back) vertebrae, a sacral vertebra, eleven caudal (tail) centrum, a left femur, tibia, humerus, ulna, radius, four metacarpals, and several appendicular fragments. However, del Corro did not describe or correctly identify many of these elements in his description. In 1993, paleontologist Leonardo Salgado redescribed Chubutisaurus and reinterpreted it as an indeterminate sauropod. In 1991, an expedition to Chubut, with the help of Mr. Martinez's son, relocated the quarry where the holotype was found. In excavations in 1991 and 2007, many new remains were unearthed including: several dorsal vertebrae fragments, a caudal vertebra, ribs, and chevrons. In 2011, these fossils, along with previously undescribed elements, were described in detail by paleontologist Jose Carballido and colleagues who concluded that they all belonged to the holotype individual. Parts of the holotype such as the femur and tibia, were donated to the Museo Provincial de Ciencias Naturales y Oceanografía and deposited under CHMO-901 and CHMO-565. The fossils unearthed by the 1991 and 2007 trips were cataloged at the Museo Paleontológico ‘Egidio Feruglio’ under MPEF-PV 1129, meaning that the holotype of Chubutisaurus is deposited in three institutions.

== Paleoecology ==
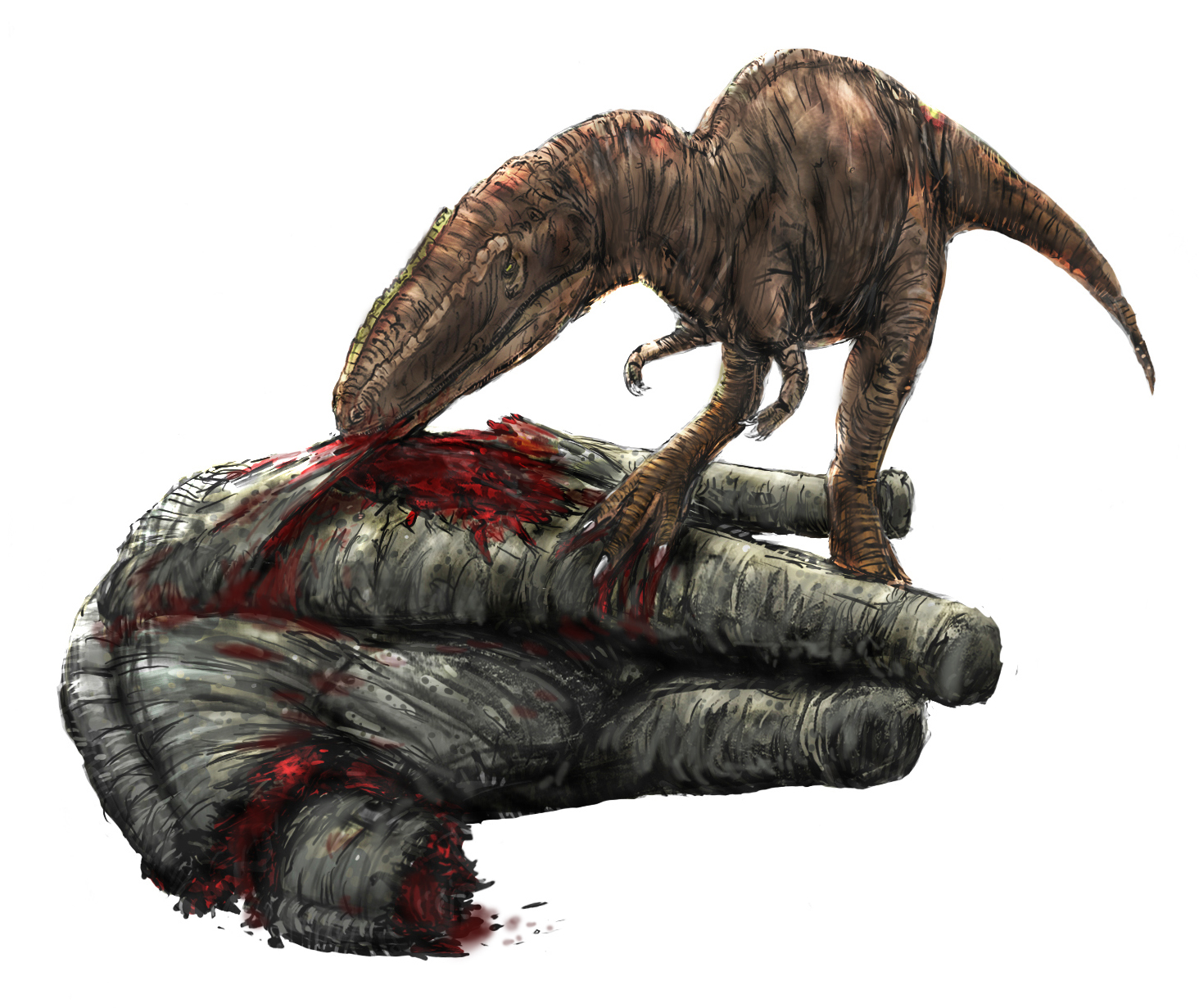
Reconstruction of a Chubutisaurus being fed on by a Tyrannotitan

Chubutisaurus is known from the Cerro Barcino Formation, which dates to the Cenomanian age of the late Cretaceous period. Other animals from this formation include the large titanosaur Patagotitan, the ceratosaurid Genyodectes, the carcharodontosaurid Tyrannotitan, and the notosuchian Barcinosuchus.
