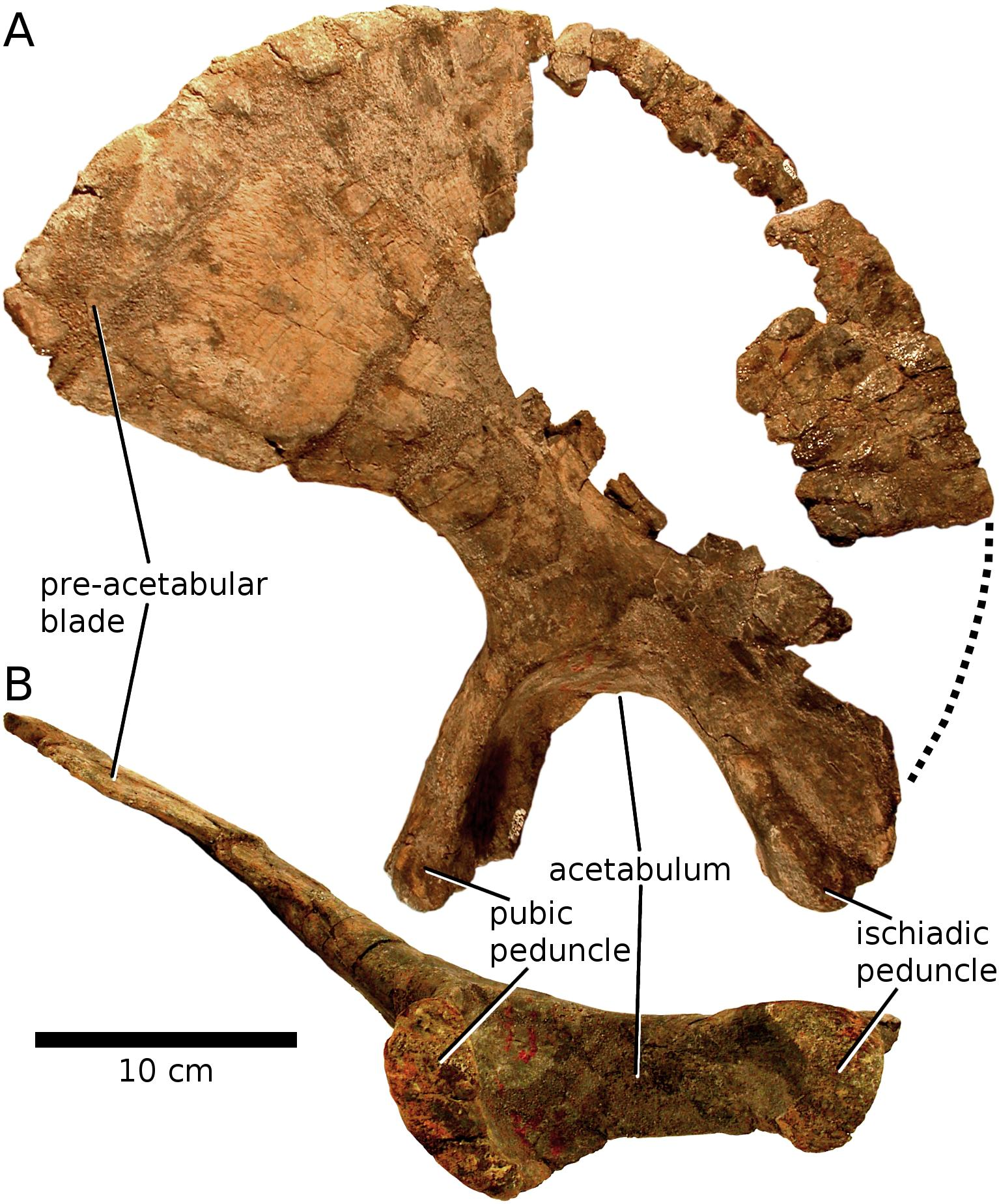
- Holotype ilium

Scientific classification
- Kingdom: Animalia
- Phylum: Chordata
- Class: Reptilia
- Clade: Dinosauria
- Clade: Saurischia
- Clade: †Sauropodomorpha
- Clade: †Sauropoda
- Clade: †Eusauropoda
- Clade: †Macronaria
- Clade: †Somphospondyli
- Genus: †Brontomerus; Taylor, Wedel & Cifelli, 2011

Species
- B. mcintoshi Taylor, Wedel & Cifelli, 2011 (type)

= Brontomerus =

Brontomerus Temporal range: Lower Cretaceous, Aptian–Albian

Extinct genus of reptiles

Brontomerus (from Greek bronte meaning "thunder", and merós meaning "thigh") is a genus of camarasauromorph sauropod which lived during the early Cretaceous (Aptian or Albian age, approximately 110 million years ago). It was named in 2011 and the type species is Brontomerus mcintoshi. It is probably a fairly basal camarasauromorph, though the taxon is difficult to resolve due to incompleteness of the material. It is most remarkable for its unusual hipbones, which would have supported the largest thigh muscles, proportionally, of any known sauropod. The specific name is in honor of physicist and North American sauropod expert John Stanton McIntosh.

== Description ==
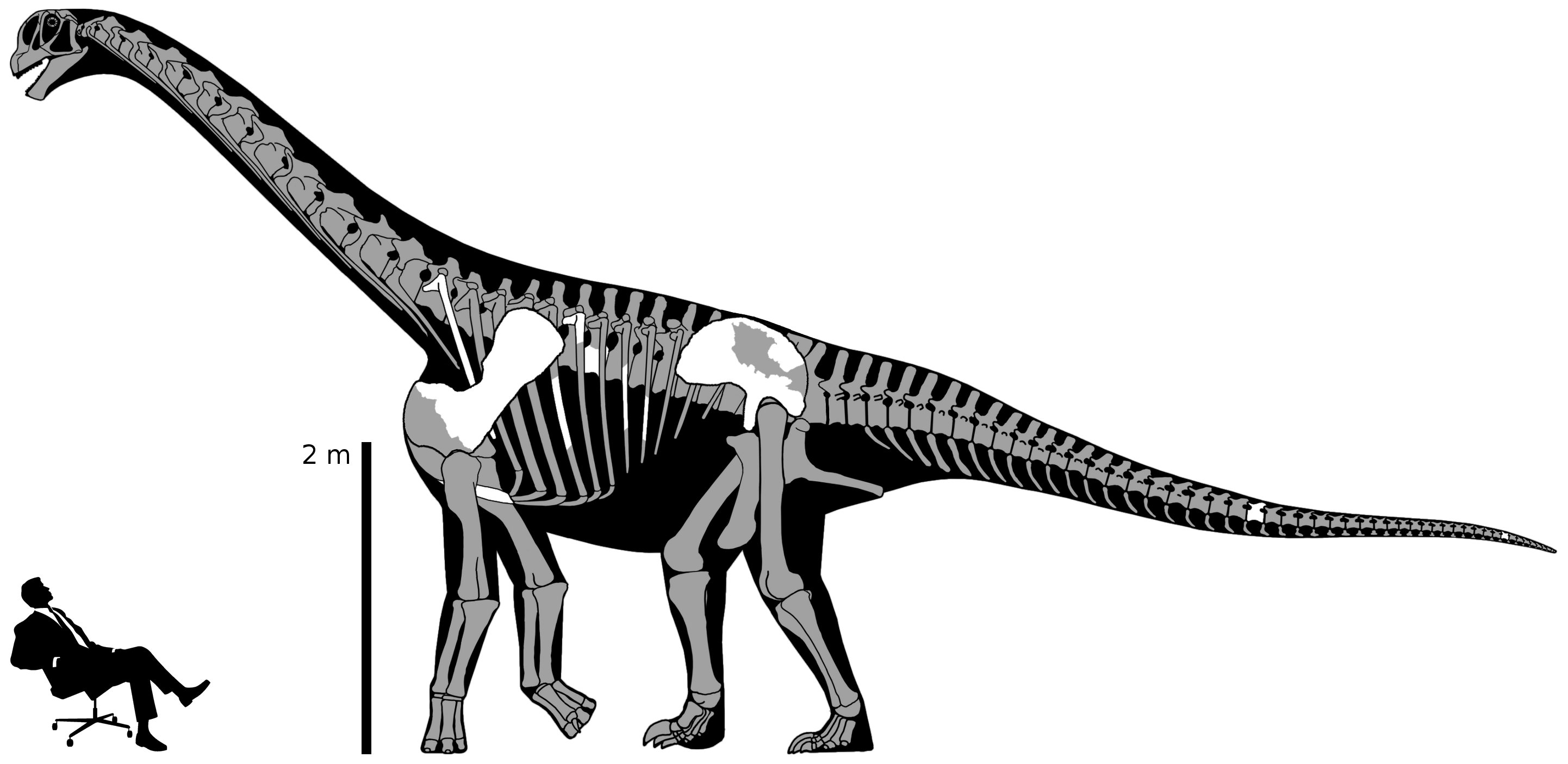
Preserved bones of Brontomerus (in white), with missing elements based on Camarasaurus

Brontomerus is known from two fragmentary specimens differing in size, likely a juvenile and an adult. The researchers speculate that the adult may have been the mother of the juvenile. The type specimen, OMNH 66430, is represented by the left ilium of the smaller individual. Other recovered fossils include a crushed presacral centrum, several caudal vertebrae, a right-side dorsal rib, a large scapula, and two partial sternal plates. The adult specimen is thought to have weighed around six tonnes, and probably measured around 14 meters (46 ft) in length. The juvenile specimen had about a third of this length, and probably weighed around 200 kilograms and measured 4.5 meters (15 ft) in length. Its assignment to a new species is based on several noteworthy autapomorphies, including an oddly-shaped hipbone which would have permitted the attachment of unusually massive leg muscles. This unique ilium would have given it the largest leg muscles of any sauropod dinosaur. The ilium is unusual in being very deep and having a front part that is much larger than the part behind the hip socket.

== Discovery ==
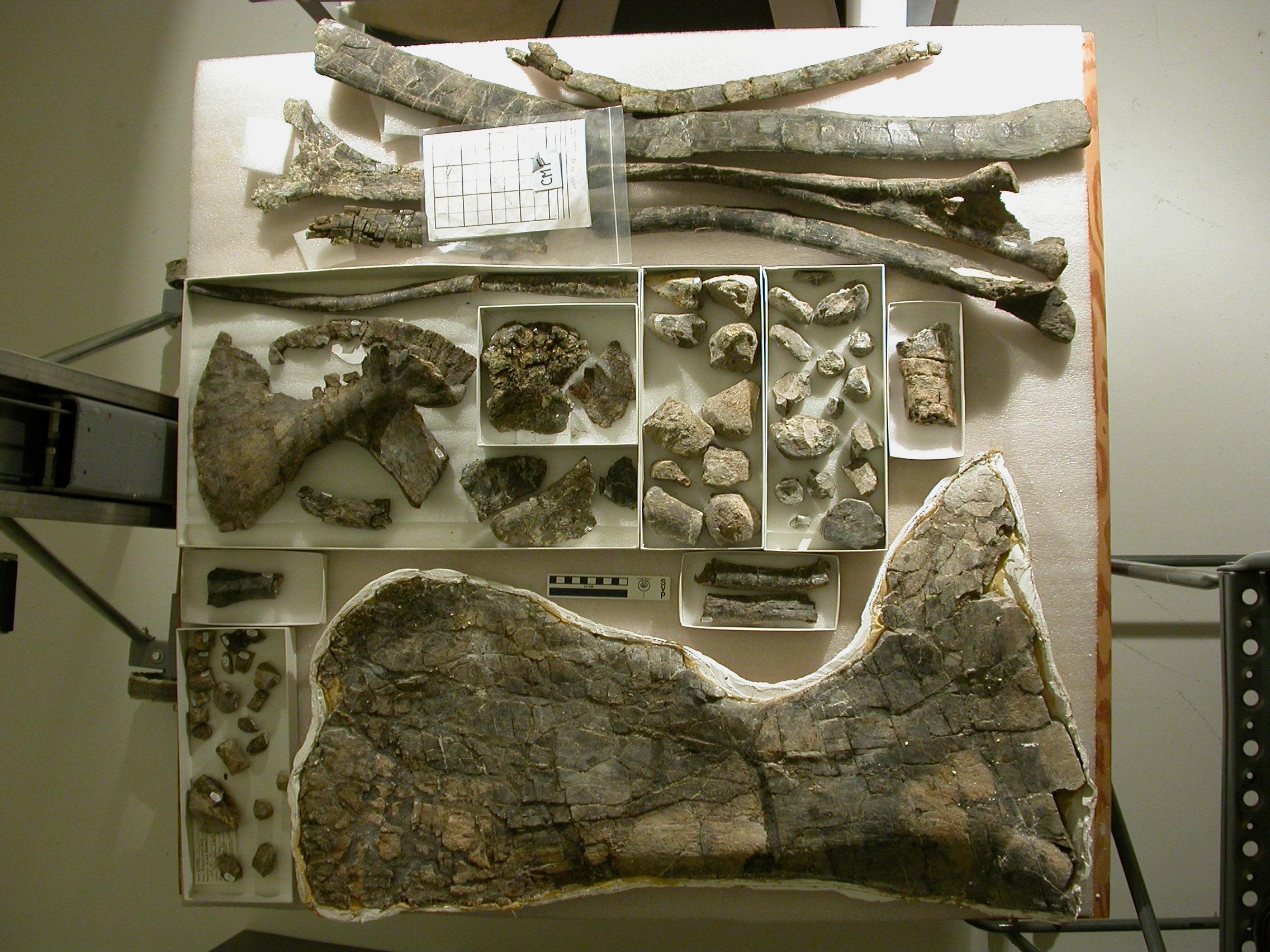
All known remains

Fossils of Brontomerus were recovered from a quarry at the top of the Ruby Ranch Member of the Cedar Mountain Formation in eastern Utah, United States. The specimens were originally collected in 1994 and 1995 by a team of researchers from the Sam Noble museum of Norman, Oklahoma. It was named and described by Michael P. Taylor, Mathew J. Wedel and Richard L. Cifelli, an international team from the University College London, Western University of Health Sciences and the Sam Noble Oklahoma Museum of Natural History. The fossils were recovered from a locality known as the Hotel Mesa Quarry in easternmost Grand County, Utah. The site had been previously known to private collectors, who had already stolen a considerable number of fossils, many of which are likely to be scientifically valuable. Exposed bones that remained were in various states of disrepair: some had even been broken and their pieces used to hold down a plastic tarpaulin. Due in part to this "pillaging" of the fossil site, the team was unable to recover more complete specimens.

== Classification ==
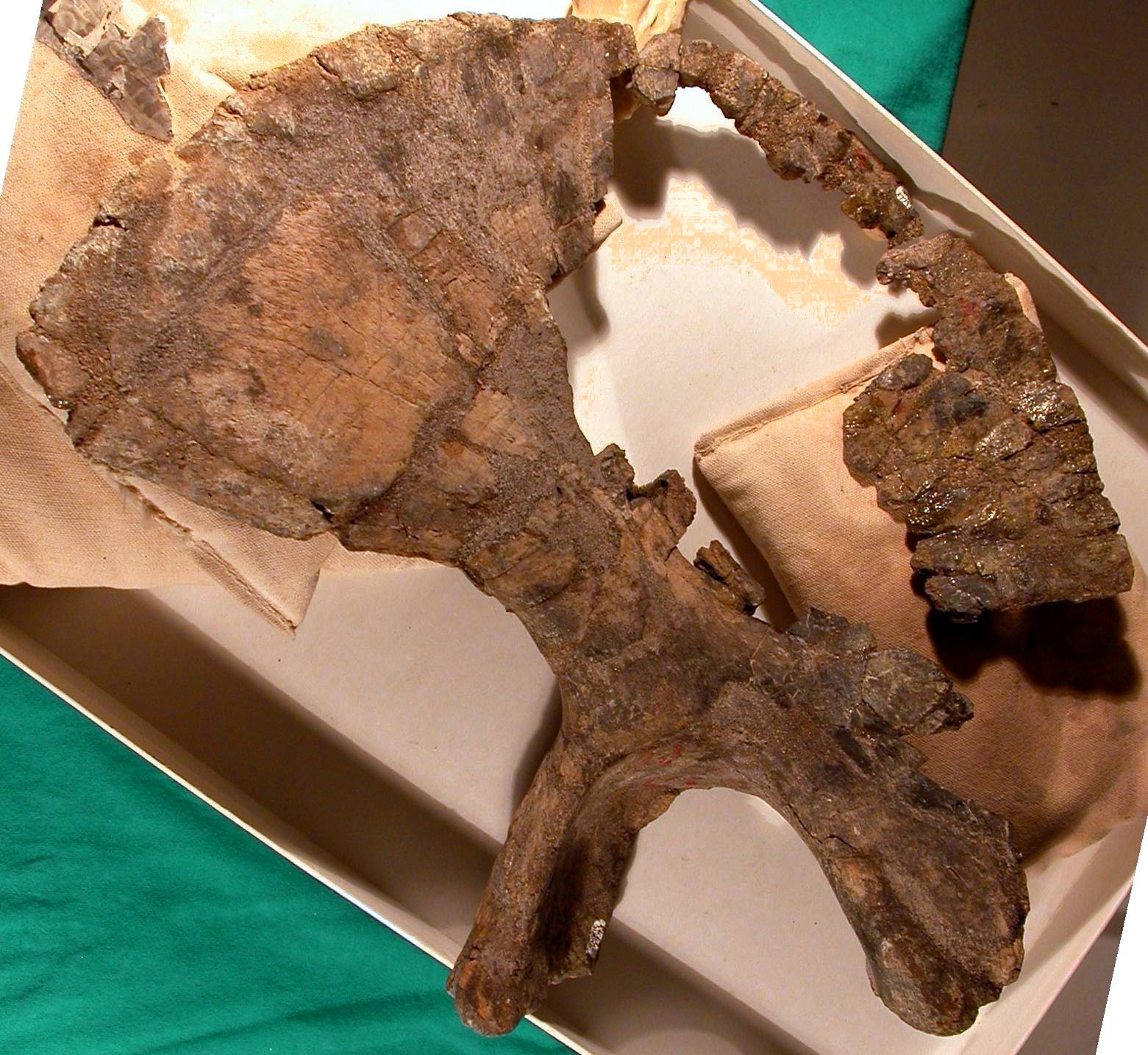
The unique and massive hipbone of Brontomerus

Based on phylogenetic analysis using a 50% majority rule tree, Brontomerus was initially placed as a basal somphospondyl within Titanosauriformes, in a trichotomy with Euhelopus and the Titanosauria. A strict consensus tree was also calculated, but yielded poorly resolved results. The tree can be seen below:

- Macronaria
  - Jobaria
  - Camarasauromorpha
    - Camarasaurus
    - Titanosauriformes
      - Brachiosaurus
      - Somphospondyli
        - Euhelopus
        - Brontomerus
        - Lithostrotia
          - Malawisaurus
          - - Nemegtosaurus
            - - Rapetosaurus
              - - Alamosaurus
                - - Isisaurus
                  - Saltasauridae
                    - Opisthocoelicaudia
                    - Saltasaurus

In 2012, D'Emic concluded that Brontomerus is a nomen dubium due to the holotype's fragmentary, nondiagnostic nature, but regarded it as referrable to Titanosauriformes.

In 2013, Mannion et al. found Brontomerus to be securely classified as a basal somphospondyl, but were not able to resolve its affinities more precisely.

== Paleobiology ==
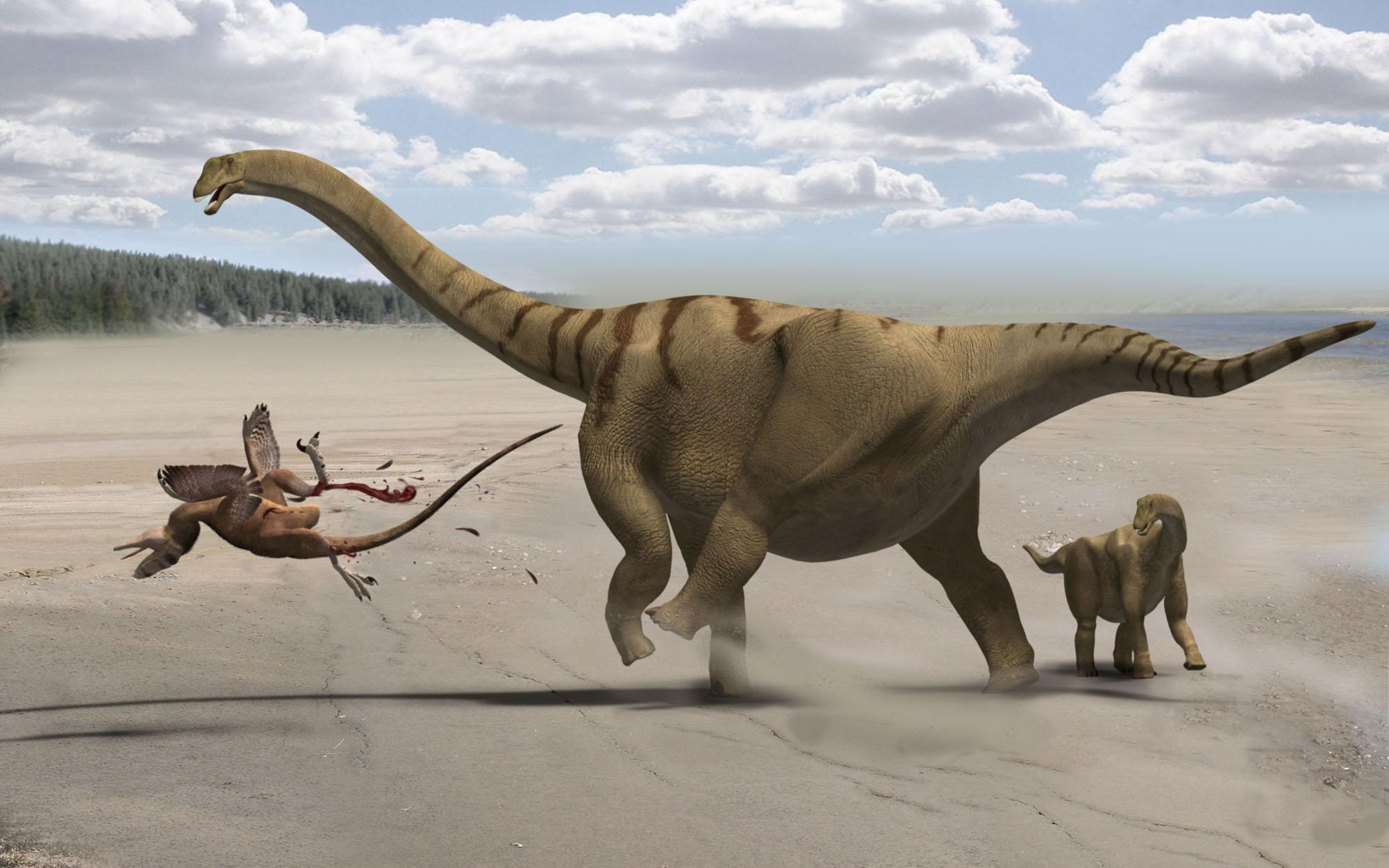
Reconstruction of Brontomerus using its strong femoral protraction muscles to deliver a kick to a Utahraptor

Dr. Michael Taylor, one of the dinosaur's describers, hypothesizes that the strong thigh muscles of Brontomerus were probably used for functions other than speed. He points out that for fast movement, the strong muscles would be oriented at the back of the leg to pull it along, but the actual positioning of the muscles indicates they were more likely used to deliver a kick. This is due to the apparent anchoring of large femoral protraction muscles, which would have been used to move the leg forward powerfully. Large femoral retraction muscles, on the other hand, are needed for fast forward locomotion, and the ilium of Brontomerus offers little attachment area for these, though this does not necessarily imply weak retraction muscles as these would have been mostly anchored on the tail-base rather than the ilium. The supposed kicks would have possibly been used for fighting over mates or in defense against predators, such as Utahraptor and Deinonychus.

Dr. Matthew Wedel, assistant professor of anatomy at the Western University of Health Sciences in Pomona, California, has stated that since it has been commonly been assumed that sauropods tend to prefer drier, upload areas, perhaps Brontomerus may have used its powerful leg muscles for traversing rough, hilly terrain. He described the theoretical use of such muscles in this terrain as "a sort of dinosaur four-wheel drive."

In addition to powerful protraction muscles, the ilium of Brontomerus would have also anchored abductor muscles, which are muscles used for drawing the leg laterally away from the body. These muscles would have been necessary for creating abduction torque when standing, and could have theoretically aided in an occasional bipedal stance or even limited bipedal walking. Another possible explanation for the proportionally large leg muscles is that they were used to control unusually long legs. While no material from the legs is known, the large anterior expansion of the scapula provides only weak support for this hypothesis. If this interpretation is correct, however, the morphology of Brontomerus may have resembled that of a giraffe.

Despite these theories, the actual data on the ilium and its powerful muscles indicates only that the animal was "unusually athletic for a sauropod". The authors acknowledge that while the unusual qualities of the hipbone probably have some functional significance, it is difficult to assess without further information about the pelvis, femora and proximal caudals.
