= Abydosaurus =

Abydosaurus Temporal range: Early Cretaceous, 104.5 Ma

Scientific classification
- Kingdom: Animalia
- Phylum: Chordata
- Class: Reptilia
- Clade: Dinosauria
- Clade: Saurischia
- Clade: †Sauropodomorpha
- Clade: †Sauropoda
- Clade: †Macronaria
- Family: †Brachiosauridae
- Genus: †Abydosaurus; Chure et al., 2010

Type species
- †Abydosaurus mcintoshi Chure et al., 2010

Extinct genus of dinosaurs

Abydosaurus (meaning "Abydos lizard") is a genus of brachiosaurid sauropod dinosaur known from skull and postcranial material found in upper Lower Cretaceous rocks of northeastern Utah, United States.

== Discovery ==
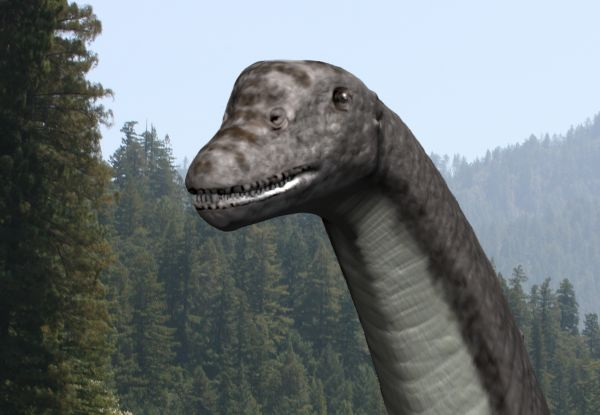
Restoration of the head and neck

Abydosaurus is one of the few sauropods known from skull material, with the first described complete skull for a Cretaceous sauropod from the Americas. It is also notable for its narrow teeth, as earlier brachiosaurids had broader teeth.

Abydosaurus is based on the holotype DINO 16488, a nearly complete skull and lower jaws with the first four neck vertebrae. Abundant skull and postcranial bones were found at the same site, including partial skulls from three additional individuals, a partial hip and associated tail vertebrae, a shoulder blade, an upper arm bone, and hand bones. These fossils were found in a sandstone bed at the base of the Mussentuchit Member of the Cedar Mountain Formation, near the old visitor center of Dinosaur National Monument. Zircons from mudstones beneath the bone-bearing sandstone indicate the age of the sandstone and its contained bones is less than 104.46 ± 0.95 million years, in the Albian stage of the Early Cretaceous.

Abydosaurus was named in 2010 by Daniel Chure and colleagues. The genus name is a reference to Egyptian mythology: Abydos is the Greek name for a city on the Nile where the head and neck of Osiris were buried, while the holotype of Abydosaurus consists of a head and neck found in rocks overlooking the Green River. The type species is A. mcintoshi in honor of John S. ("Jack") McIntosh, Professor of Physics, Emeritus, Wesleyan University, and his contributions to Dinosaur National Monument and the study of sauropod dinosaurs.

== Description ==
Although Abydosaurus lived some 50 million years after Giraffatitan, the skulls of these two genera are similar except for the narrower, sharper teeth and smaller nose of Abydosaurus. Abydosaurus can be differentiated from all other sauropods, including Giraffatitan, by subtle features of the nasal and maxillary bones, its relatively small external nares (nostrils), and some features of the teeth. In 2012 Thomas Holtz gave a length of 18.3 metres (60 ft).
