= Venenosaurus =

Venenosaurus Temporal range: Early Cretaceous, 112 Ma

Scientific classification
- Kingdom: Animalia
- Phylum: Chordata
- Clade: Dinosauria
- Clade: Saurischia
- Clade: †Sauropodomorpha
- Clade: †Sauropoda
- Clade: †Macronaria
- Family: †Brachiosauridae
- Genus: †Venenosaurus; Tidwell et al., 2001
- Species: †V. dicrocei

Binomial name
- †Venenosaurus dicrocei Tidwell et al., 2001

Extinct genus of dinosaurs

Venenosaurus (/vɛˌnɛnoʊˈsɔːrəs/ ven-EN-o-SOR-əs) is a genus of sauropod dinosaur that lived in what is now Utah during the Early Cretaceous. Its type and only species is Venenosaurus dicrocei. Fossils of Venenosaurus were first discovered in 1998, by Denver Museum of Natural History volunteer Anthony DiCroce, and described as a new genus and species in 2001 by Virginia Tidwell and colleagues, who named the species for DiCroce. Venenosaurus was a relatively small sauropod, and was similar to Cedarosaurus, another sauropod from the Early Cretaceous of Utah.

== Discovery and naming ==
In the spring of 1998, a team of volunteers for the Denver Museum of Natural History (Note: Now the Denver Museum of Nature and Science), including Anthony "Tony" DiCroce, found a fossil site in Grand County, Utah, which they named Tony's Bone Bed. The bone bed was in the Poison Strip Member of the Cedar Mountain Formation, and contained the remains of the iguanodont Planicoxa, a theropod, and an adult and juvenile of a sauropod. In 2001, Virginia Tidwell, Kenneth Carpenter, and Susanne Meyer described the sauropod remains as a new genus and species, Venenosaurus dicrocei. The genus name comes from the Latin veneno, "poison", in reference to the Poison Strip Member, and the species name honors DiCroce for his discovery of the fossils.

== Fossil record ==
Venenosaurus fossils are known from the Poison Strip Member of the Cedar Mountain Formation, including the holotype, DMNS 40932, a partial skeleton of an adult individual, which consists of nine tail vertebrae, the left scapula, right radius, left ulna, metacarpals, forefoot phalanges, right pubis, left and right ischia, metatarsals, chevrons, and ribs. A few bones of a juvenile individual are also known from the same site. These specimens are housed at the Denver Museum of Nature and Science. Additional specimens of Venenosaurus have been reported from Dalton Wells Quarry, in the Yellow Cat Member of the Cedar Mountain Formation, comprising the fragmentary remains of least three individuals. However, it is not certain whether these specimens belong to Venenosaurus or its close relative Cedarosaurus.

== Anatomy ==
The scientists who first described V. dicrocei observed that the new species most closely resembles Cedarosaurus, while still being distinct. Venenosaurus is a relatively small titanosauriform sauropod, measuring 12 metres (39 ft) long and weighing 6 metric tons (6.6 short tons).

=== Limbs ===
The radius of Venenosaurus is more slender than the radii of Alamosaurus, Chubutisaurus, Opisthocoelicaudia, and Saltasaurus. The ratio of the radius' least circumference to length produces a ratio of .33, more gracile than the radius of Camarasaurus lewisi and C. grandis. Cedarosaurus, however, has a slightly more gracile ratio of .31. The team found that Brachiosaurus brancai's radius is the closest anatomical match to that of Venenosaurus. The metacarpals of Venenosaurus are long and slender. With the exception of the incomplete first metacarpal, all of the right metacarpals are known. Metatarsal I is the shortest and most robust of the three recovered metatarsals. Cedarosaurus had a more gracile ulna and radius than Venenosaurus.

=== Pelvis ===
Venenosaurus shows a mixture of titanosaur and non-titanosaur ischium-to-pubis proportions. Its hips most closely resemble those of Brachiosaurus.

=== Vertebrae ===
The vertebrae in the middle and toward the end of the tail were short, distinguishing it from titanosaurs like Andesaurus, Malawisaurus, Aeolosaurus, Alamosaurus, and Saltasaurus. The neural spines in the middle tail vertebrae are angled toward the front of the animal. These vertebrae resemble those of Cedarosaurus, Aeolosaurus, and Gondwanatitan. The vertebrae are located at a transitional position from anterior to posterior caudal vertebrae.

Venenosaurus had unusual lateral fossae, which looked like deep depressions in the outside walls of the vertebral centra. Some fossae are divided into two chambers by a ridge inside the depression. In most sauropods the fossae would form pneumatic openings leading to the interior of the centrum, rather than just being a depression. Less well-developed, but similar fossae are known from Cedarosaurus. Fossae that similarly resemble shallow depressions are known from Saltasaurus, Alamosaurus, Aeolosaurus, Gondwanatitan, and Malawisaurus. These taxa differ, however, in that their fossae are even shallower, lack the division into chambers, and do not extend as far into the vertebral columns as those of Venenosaurus.

The vertebrae near the base of the tail are extremely useful for classifying sauropods. Derived titanosaurs had vertebrae that were convex on the front and back. Primitive sauropods had vertebrae that were either flat on both ends (amphiplaty) or concave on both (amphicoely). Venenosaurus may have had a condition intermediate between the two. The possession of amphiplatyan caudal centra with anteriorly facing neural spines is a unique identifier of this species. Sometimes the form of central articulations change within a single individual's vertebral column.
