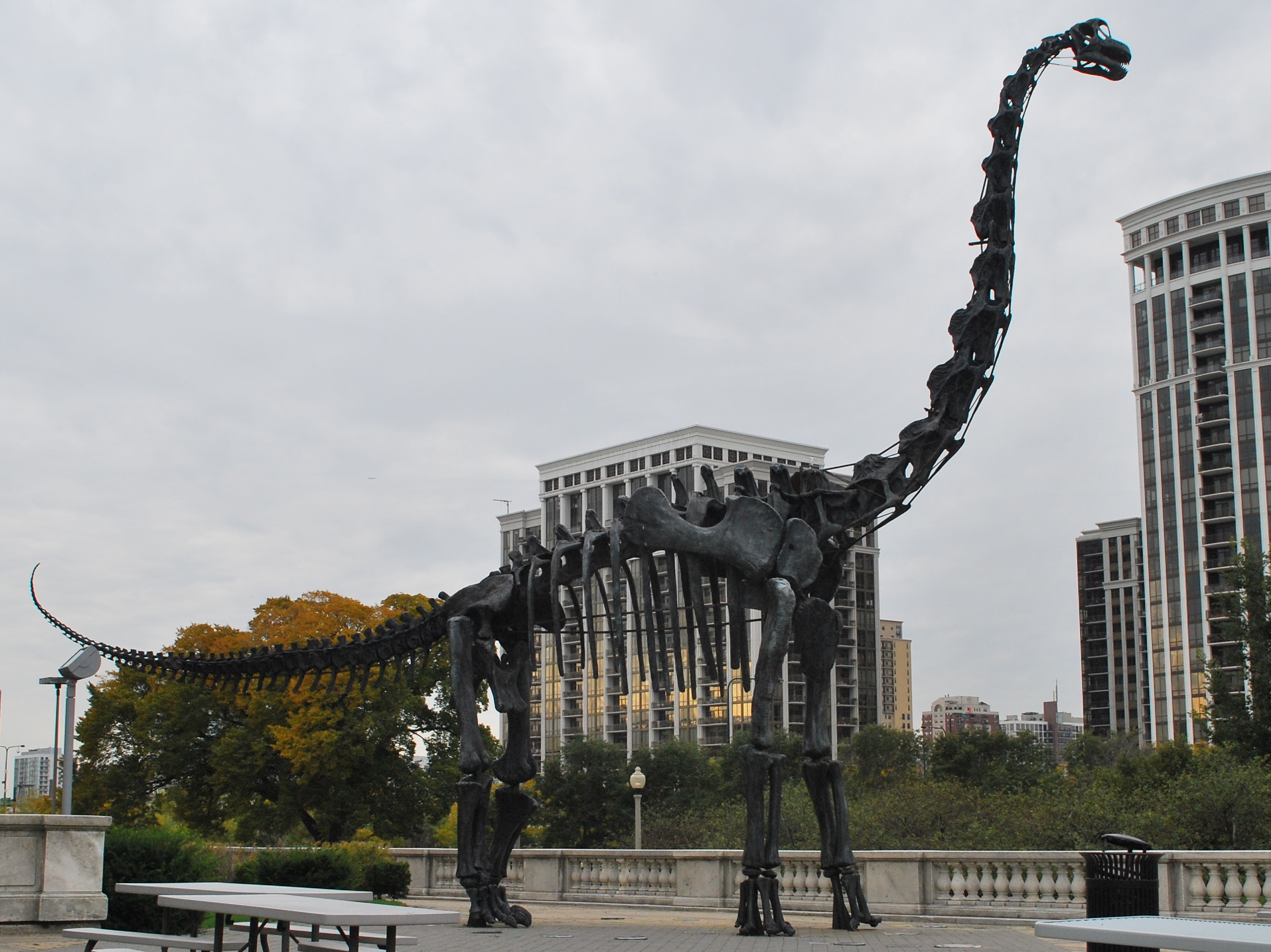
- Mounted Brachiosaurus skeleton cast, Field Museum of Natural History

Scientific classification
- Kingdom: Animalia
- Phylum: Chordata
- Class: Reptilia
- Clade: Dinosauria
- Clade: Saurischia
- Clade: †Sauropodomorpha
- Clade: †Sauropoda
- Clade: †Macronaria
- Clade: †Titanosauriformes
- Family: †Brachiosauridae; Riggs, 1904

Genera
- †Abydosaurus; †Atlasaurus?; †Bicharracosaurus?; †Brachiosaurus; †Cedarosaurus; †Europasaurus?; †Galvesaurus?; †Giraffatitan; †Lusotitan; †Pelorosaurus; †Sonorasaurus; †Soriatitan; †Venenosaurus; †Vouivria

= Brachiosauridae =

Brachiosaurids Temporal range: Late Jurassic–Late Cretaceous (Oxfordian–Cenomanian), 160–93 Ma Possible Bathonian record

Extinct family of dinosaurs

The Brachiosauridae ("arm lizards", from Greek brachion (βραχίων) = "arm" and sauros = "lizard") are a family or clade of herbivorous, quadrupedal sauropod dinosaurs. Brachiosaurids had long necks that enabled them to access the leaves of tall trees that other sauropods would have been unable to reach. In addition, they possessed thick spoon-shaped teeth which helped them to consume tough plants more efficiently than other sauropods. They have also been characterized by a few unique traits or synapomorphies; dorsal vertebrae with 'rod-like' transverse processes and an ischium with an abbreviated pubic peduncle.

Brachiosaurus is one of the best-known members of the Brachiosauridae, and was once thought to be the largest land animal to ever live. Brachiosaurids thrived in the regions which are now North and South America, Africa, Europe and Asia. They first appear in the fossil record in the Late Jurassic period (possibly even earlier in the Middle Jurassic) and disappear in the Late Cretaceous period. The broad distribution of Brachiosauridae in both northern and southern continents suggests that the group originated prior to the breakup of Pangaea. In the Early Cretaceous the distribution of the group is dramatically reduced. It is still unclear whether this reduction is due to local extinctions or to the limited nature of the Early Cretaceous fossil record.

Brachiosauridae has been defined as all titanosauriforms that are more closely related to Brachiosaurus than to Saltasaurus. It is one of the three main groups of the clade Titanosauriformes, which also includes the Euhelopodidae and the Titanosauria.

== Description ==
The Brachiosauridae are composed of quadrupedal dinosaurs that are generally very large, with the exception of the possible insular dwarf Europasaurus. The brachiosaurids can be distinguished from other macronarian taxa by their broad, thick and spoon-shaped teeth. Their maxillary teeth were twisted apically, at the top, and the shape of these teeth was optimal for biting off resistant vegetation. While brachiosaurids, like other sauropods, did not perform significant food processing in their mouths, their teeth enabled them to slice through food instead of having to pull it from tree branches. Evidence for this precision shearing consists of apical wear facets on the teeth and distinctive bone structure that suggests orthal, vertical jaw action.

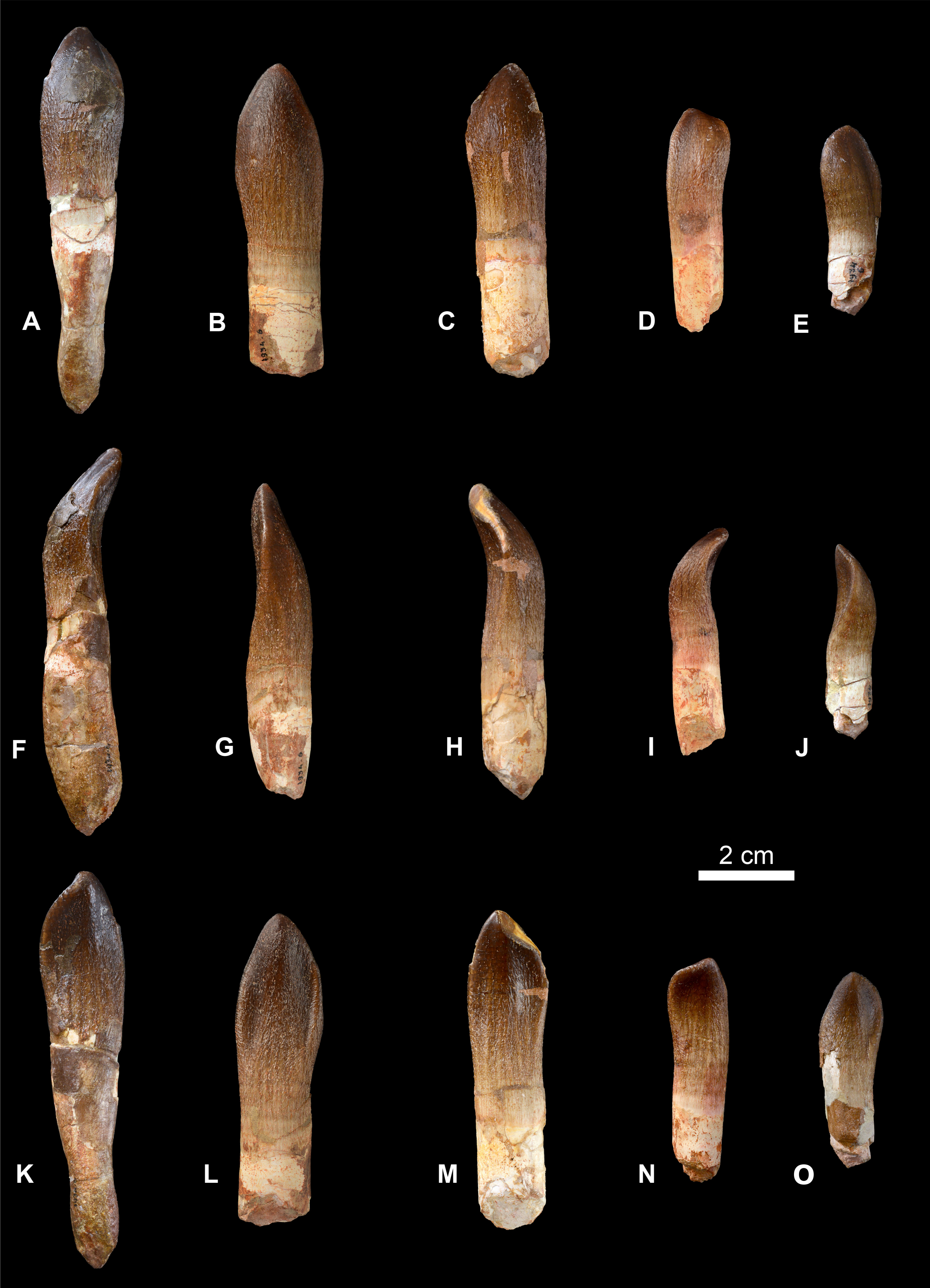
Typical brachiosaurid teeth, i.c. those of Vouivria

In addition, the characteristic long necks of brachiosaurids are distinct from those of other long-necked dinosaur taxa. They possessed a narrow neck composed of twelve to thirteen extremely long cervical vertebrae that was laterally inflexible and dorsoventrally, vertically, flexible. This meant that brachiosaurids could angle their necks up and lift their heads, enabling them to graze from treetops up to a height of about 14 m (46 ft). It has been argued that other sauropods lacked this dorsoventral flexibility and that their necks stretched outwards in front of them instead of upwards. Brachiosaurids have more often been found in the conifer-rich sites, like the Tendaguru, than in the Morrison deposits, suggesting that their fitness was increased by the presence of taller conifer food sources.

However, the giant size and long necks of brachiosaurids meant that they required tremendous pressure to bring oxygenated blood to their brains. It has been proposed that sauropods possessed a four-chambered double pump heart, with one pump for oxygenated and one pump for deoxygenated blood.

As in all Macronaria, the forelimbs of brachiosaurids are long relative to the hindlimbs, but this trait is more pronounced in brachiosaurids. The forelimbs were very slender for a sauropod and the metacarpal bones of the forelimb were elongated. These adaptations overall increased the stride length of the forelimbs, arguably resulting in an uneven gait. However, it was previously argued that they were hindlimb dominant like other sauropods, and thus had the ability to rear up on their hindlimbs. Based on the structure of their legs, making it impossible for them to run, it is likely that they moved about in a low walking speed, 20–40 km/day (12-25 mi/day), but they were capable of moving faster when necessary, up to 20–30 km/h (12–19 mph), depending on leg length.

Brachiosaurids shared synapomorphies, new traits typical for the group. They possessed middle and rear back vertebrae with long, 'rod-like' transverse processes. In the pelvis, the ischium had a shortened pubic peduncle, the contact surface with the pubic bone. Their humeri, upper arm bones, had a large deltopectoral crest. Their skull roofs showed wide supratemporal fenestrae, openings for the muscles. They had neural arches placed more on front of the vertebrae, shoulder blades that were expanded at the top end, irregularly shaped coracoids in the shoulder girdle, and triangular projections on the underside of the front branch of their quadratojugal bones at the lower rear corner of the skull.

== History of findings ==
=== Changing classifications ===
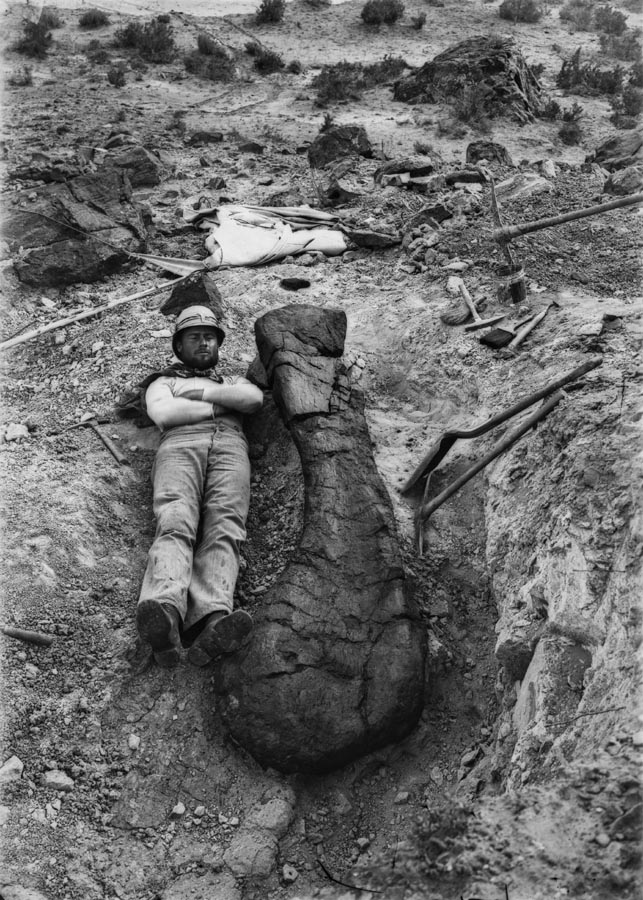
Brachiosaurus humerus bone

In 1903, Elmer Samuel Riggs described and named Brachiosaurus. In 1904, he created a new sauropod family, the Brachiosauridae. He published a complete description of the phenotype after examining the humerus, femur, coracoid and sacrum of the Brachiosaurus holotype that had been prepared at the Field Columbian Museum. Since then, the classification of these sauropods has been through many changes. Marsh's multifamily theory of sauropod classification prevailed until 1929, when Werner Janensch proposed a two-family theory based on differences in sauropod teeth. Macronarians with broad, spatulate teeth, were placed in the family Brachiosauridae, while sauropods with more slender and peg-shaped teeth were considered titanosaurs. This put diplodocids and titanosaurids together in one group based on their similar teeth, despite the many other differences between the taxa. Today, about four to five groups within the Macronaria are considered families (with names ending in ~idae).

In 1997, Salgado, Coria and Calvo studied the traits that had been used to set the Brachiosauridae apart and determined that they were in fact plesiomorphic, original, for all basal Titanosauriformes. They proposed that some characteristics that had been used to differentiate Brachiosaurus were synapomorphies for the Titanosauriformes as a whole. They concluded that the family Brachiosauridae was actually a "grade" of not specially related primitive titanosauriforms, and not a stable separate clade. They partly based this conclusion on similar humerus:femur length ratios known for titanosauriforms, basal titanosaurs, and more basal sauropods. However, in 1998 Sereno & Wilson published data contrary to the conclusions in Salgado et al.'s article, indicating that the Brachiosauridae were a separate clade in the Titanosauriformes. After 1998, new brachiosaurid species have been named, generally confirming that the Brachiosauridae were a natural group.

=== Important findings ===
In 1943, de Lapparent described the "French Bothriospondylus" from the Oxfordian of France which dates to the Late Jurassic, which was identified in 2013 by Philip Mannion as a brachiosaurid and named Vouivria damparisensis in 2017. This specimen represents the oldest undisputed record of the brachiosaurid group.

The following diagram is a timeline of important brachiosaurid discoveries, the date given being that of the naming of the genus. The actual excavation was often much earlier, in the case of Vouivria eighty-three years and of Duriatitan at least 136 years.

== Paleo biogeographic distribution ==
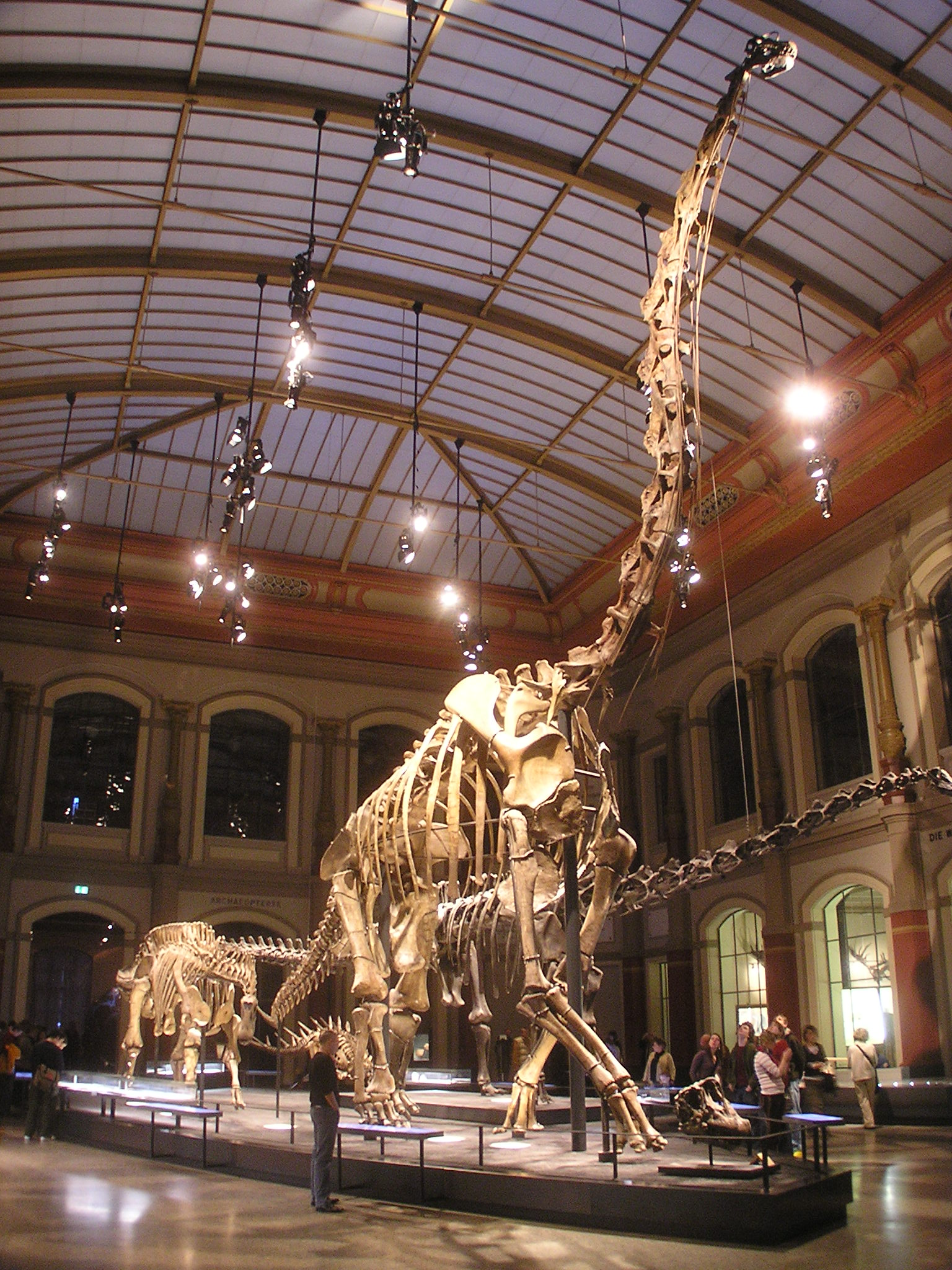
Giraffatitan skeleton from the Tendaguru Formation

Definitive brachiosaurid remains have been found from the Late Jurassic period to the Early Cretaceous, from about 157 to 100 million years ago. In addition, Macronaria in general first appear in the Late Jurassic. However, the almost simultaneous appearance of Camarasaurus, Brachiosaurus and a possible titanosaur suggest that they originated earlier, closer to the Middle Jurassic.

Trackway evidence also supports a Middle Jurassic origin for titanosauriforms, which implies the same for all neosauropods. Brachiosaurids in particular have a broad distribution dating to the Late Jurassic. Late Jurassic specimens have been discovered in the northern and southern Hemispheres, including North America, Africa, Europe and South America. This suggests that brachiosaurids originated in the Middle Jurassic, prior to the breakup of Pangaea, followed by diversification and dispersal that resulted in the global spread present in the Late Jurassic.

This conclusion is further supported by paleogeographic data. While many Late Jurassic dinosaur remains have been found in China, no brachiosaurid remains have been uncovered in East Asia. This would support the Middle Jurassic origin theory since East Asia was separated from the rest of Pangaea by water from the late Middle Jurassic to the Early Cretaceous.

While brachiosaurids were widely dispersed in the Late Jurassic, their geographic distribution narrowed in the Early Cretaceous. So far, brachiosaurid specimens have only been found in the Aptian–Albian region of North America. This reduction in distribution occurs immediately following the Jurassic–Cretaceous boundary. The brachiosaurid distribution in the Early Cretaceous has been interpreted as a result of regional extinctions in Europe, Africa and South America. Overall, the Early Cretaceous seems to be a time of reduced sauropod diversity worldwide. It has been argued that this change may be due to an extinction event at the Jurassic–Cretaceous boundary. A second hypothesis is that the apparent lack of geographical diversity is due to sampling bias in the generally poor Early Cretaceous fossil record. Recently discovered evidence supports the conclusion that brachiosaurids existed outside of North America in lower latitudes of Gondwana in the Early Cretaceous. Buffetaut et al. 2006 reported on the discovery of two isolated teeth found in lower Cretaceous sediments of Lebanon that possess posteriorly twisted crowns, which are characteristic of the brachiosaurids Giraffatitan and Abydosaurus. In addition, a brachiosaurid named Padillasaurus leivaensis was discovered in Colombia from the Early Cretaceous and placed in the Brachiosauridae taxon, which suggests that Brachiosauridae survived in northwestern Gondwana after the Jurassic/Cretaceous boundary. In the Early Cretaceous, Colombia was located close to the equator in northwestern Gondwana while Lebanon was in the northeast of Gondwana. This suggests that brachiosaurids were in fact present outside of North America in the Early Cretaceous, and supports the theory that the apparent lack of specimens is due to an incomplete record. However, the rarity of these dinosaur specimens may also reflect a decrease in abundance of brachiosaurids acting in combination with the poor fossil record. Also, in 2017 a study indicated that Padillasaurus was not a brachiosaurid but a basal member of the Somphospondyli.

== Classification ==
Brachiosauridae is one of the two major clades of Titanosauriformes, a diverse group of sauropods that existed in the Late Jurassic and Cretaceous in Laurasia and Gondwana. Europasaurus is considered the most basal brachiosaurid.

Titanosauriformes was a globally distributed, long-lived clade of dinosaurs that contained both the largest- and smallest-known sauropods. This clade was composed of three distinct groups: Brachiosauridae, a mix of Late Jurassic and Early Cretaceous sauropods, Euhelopodidae, a group of mid-Cretaceous East Asian sauropods, and Titanosauria, a large Cretaceous clade located mostly in Gondwana.

Traditionally, Brachiosauridae included Brachiosaurus and some other suggestively assigned genera. Following the generic separation of Brachiosaurus species into B. altithorax and Giraffatitan brancai these have sometimes been the only members supported by cladistic analysis.

Cladogram of Brachiosauridae after D'Emic et al. (2016)

- Brachiosauridae
  - Europasaurus
  - - - Giraffatitan
      - Sonorasaurus
    - - Brachiosaurus
      - Abydosaurus
      - Cedarosaurus
      - Venenosaurus
      - Lusotitan

Cladogram of Brachiosauridae after Mannion et al. (2017)

- Brachiosauridae
  - Europasaurus
  - - Vouivria
    - - Brachiosaurus
      - - - Giraffatitan
          - Sonorasaurus
        - - Lusotitan
          - - Cedarosaurus
            - Venenosaurus
