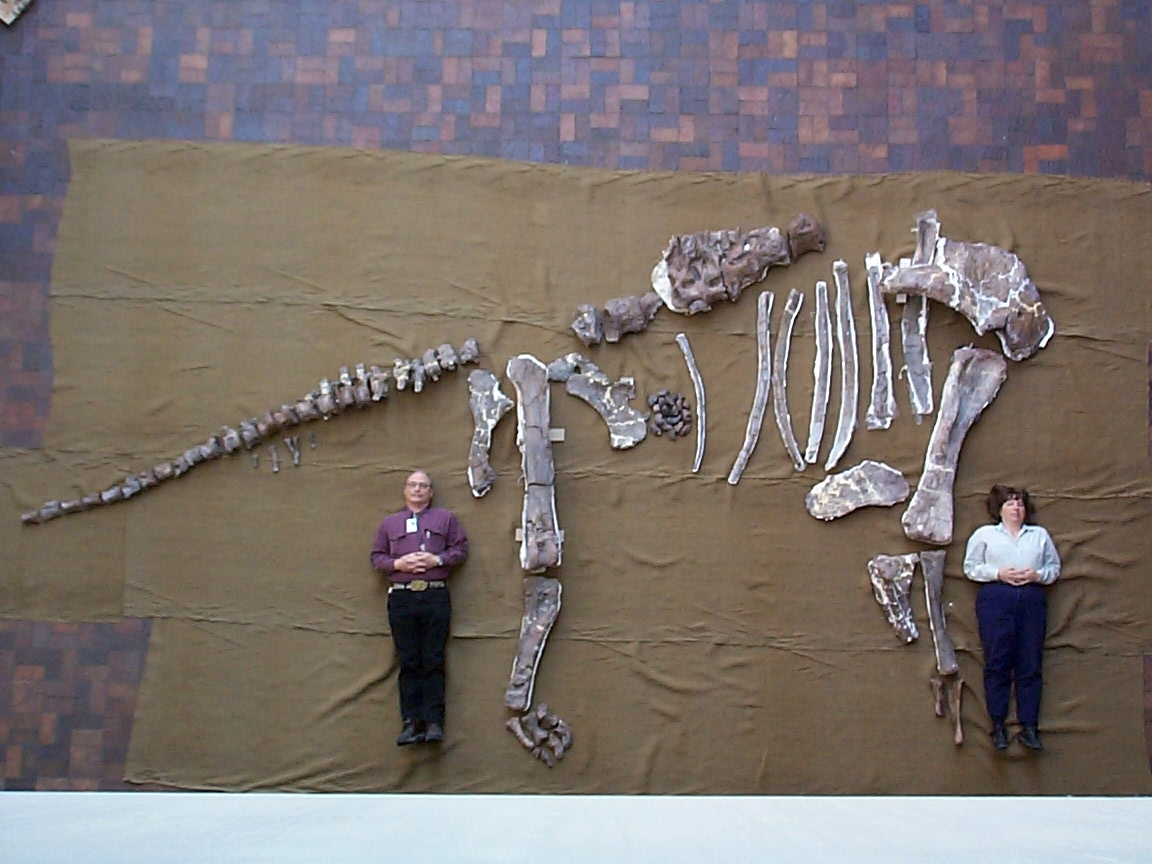
- Cedarosaurus with two of the authors (Bill Brooks, Virginia Tidwell) who named and described the specimen

Scientific classification
- Kingdom: Animalia
- Phylum: Chordata
- Class: Reptilia
- Clade: Dinosauria
- Clade: Saurischia
- Clade: †Sauropodomorpha
- Clade: †Sauropoda
- Clade: †Macronaria
- Family: †Brachiosauridae
- Genus: †Cedarosaurus; Tidwell et al., 1999
- Species: †C. weiskopfae

Binomial name
- †Cedarosaurus weiskopfae Tidwell et al., 1999

= Cedarosaurus =

Cedarosaurus Temporal range: Early Cretaceous, 139–134.6 Ma

Extinct species of reptile

Cedarosaurus (meaning "Cedar lizard" - named after the Cedar Mountain Formation, in which it was discovered) is a genus of nasal-crested macronarian sauropod dinosaur from the Early Cretaceous Period (Valanginian). The fossils were discovered in 1996 in eastern Utah within the rocks of the Yellow Cat Member of the Cedar Mountain Formation. It was officially named and described by Tidwell, Carpenter and Brooks in 1999. It shows similarities to the brachiosaurid Eucamerotus from the Wessex Formation of southern England, as well as to Brachiosaurus from the Morrison Formation.

== Description ==
Size comparison

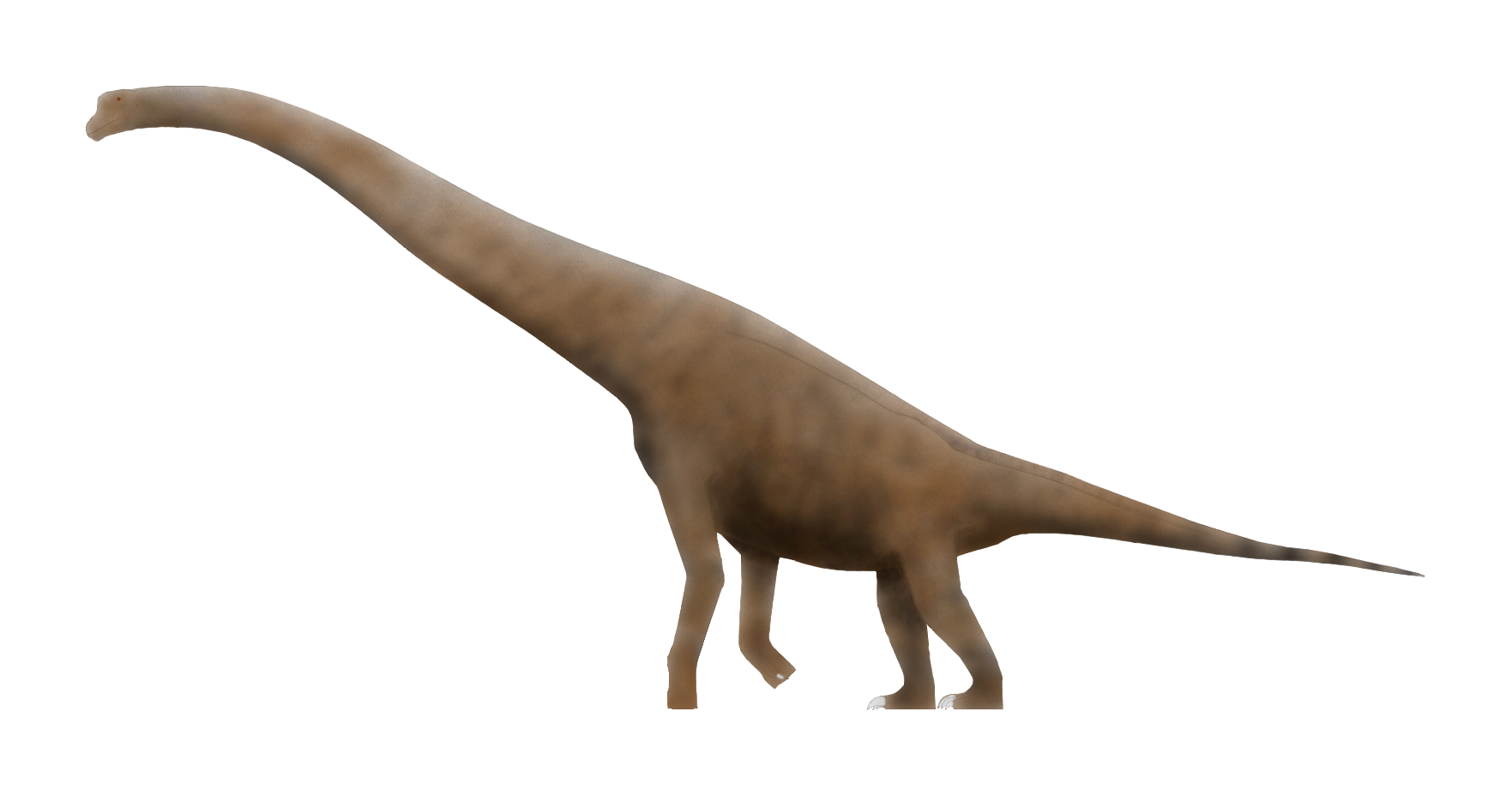
Life restoration

Cedarosaurus was identified as a brachiosaurid sauropod. Prior to its classification as a new genus, brachiosaurid fossil material from the early and middle Cretaceous Period which had been found in North America was ascribed to the genus Pleurocoelus, which is now regarded as a junior synonym of Astrodon. However, the shape of the animal's vertebrae and forelimb bones were distinct enough to warrant its classification as a new genus.

Cedarosaurus had a more gracile ulna and radius than its relative Venenosaurus. The ratio of the radius' least circumference to its length is .31 in Cedarosaurus. Metatarsal II is more gracile in Cedarosaurus.

Its middle tail vertebrae's neural spines are angled anteriorly when the vertebrae are aligned. These vertebrae resemble those of Gondwanatitan, Venenosaurus, and Aeolosaurus.

The related Venenosaurus had unusual lateral fossae, which looked like deep depressions in the outside walls of the vertebral centra. Some fossae are divided into two chambers by a ridge inside the depression. In most sauropods the fossae would form pneumatic openings leading to the interior of the centrum, rather than just being a depression. Less well-developed, but similar fossae are known from Cedarosaurus itself.

In 2010, Gregory S. Paul estimated the maximum length up to 15 meters (49 ft) and mass up to 10 metric tons (11 short tons).

== Gastroliths ==
In 2001 Frank Sanders, Kim Manley, and Kenneth Carpenter published a study on 115 gastroliths discovered in association with a Cedarosaurus specimen. The stones were identified as gastroliths on the basis of their tight spatial distribution, partial matrix support, and an edge-on orientation indicative of their being deposited while the carcass still had soft tissue. Their high surface reflectance values are consistent with other known dinosaur gastroliths. Nearly all of the Cedarosaurus gastroliths were found within a .06 m volume of space in the gut region of the skeleton.

The total mass of the gastroliths themselves was 7 kilograms (15 lb). Most were less than 10 millilitres (0.35 imp fl oz; 0.34 US fl oz) in volume. The least massive clast was 0.1 grams (0.0035 oz) and the most was 715 grams (25.2 oz), with most of them being toward the smaller end of that range. The clasts tended to be close to spherical in shape, although the largest specimens were also the most irregular. The largest gastroliths contributed the most to the total surface area of the set. Some gastroliths were so large and irregularly shaped that they may have been difficult to swallow. The gastroliths were mostly composed of chert, with some sandstone, siltstone, and quartzite clasts also included. Some of the chert clasts actually contained fossils.

Since some of the most irregular gastroliths are also the largest, it is unlikely that they were ingested by accident. Cedarosaurus may have found irregular clasts to be attractive potential gastroliths or was not selective about shape. The clasts were generally of dull coloration, suggesting that color was not a major factor for the sauropod's decision making. The high surface area to volume ratio of the largest clasts suggests that the gastroliths may have broken down ingested plant material by grinding or crushing it. The sandstone clasts tended to be fragile and some broke in the process of collection. The sandstone gastroliths may have been rendered fragile after deposition by loss of cement caused by the external chemical environment. If the clasts had been that fragile while the animal was alive, they probably rolled and tumbled in the digestive tract. If they were more robust, they could have served as part of a ball-mill system.
