= Haemal arch =

Anatomical feature of vertebrate tail vertebrae

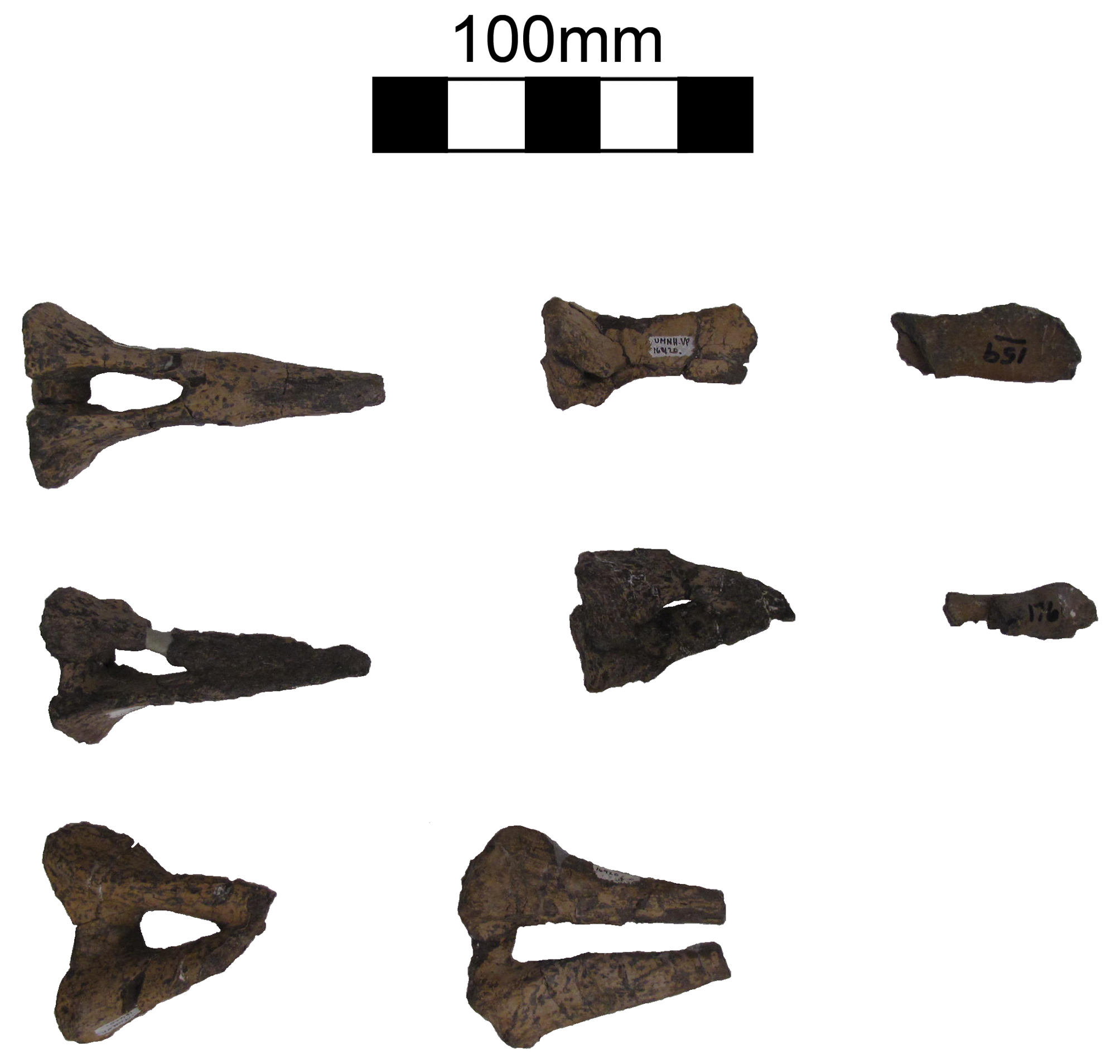
Haemal arches of Nothronychus

A haemal arch, also known as a chevron, is a bony arch on the ventral side of a caudal vertebra of a vertebrate. The canal formed by the space between the arch and the vertebral body is the haemal canal. A spinous ventral process emerging from the haemal arch is referred to as the haemal spine.

The term haemapohysis has historically been used to refer to the haemal arch. In modern usage, however, the term refers to a projection of the vertebral centrum with which the haemal arch articulates.

== Anatomy ==
When present, chevrons are located on the underside of the tail, and generally are situated below the intervertebral space between two caudal vertebrae. They typically develop from two ossification centres, and usually remain separate (often mobile) elements from the vertebrae; sometimes, however, they become fused to the centrum.

Blood vessels to and from the tail run through the arch. In reptiles, the caudofemoralis longus muscle, one of the main muscles involved in locomotion, attaches to the lateral sides of the haemal arches. In mammals, they provide anchor points for the ventral flexor muscles of the tail.

The haemal arches are considered a part of the caudal intercentrum system, and often fuse to the intercentrum proper.

== Evolution ==
Haemal arches are present in the tails of actinopterygian fishes. Among early members of the group, the haemal arch co-occurs with the ventral arch, suggesting that the haemal arch of modern ray-finned fishes may in fact represent a fusion of the two elements. Ventrally, the haemal arches articulate with the haemal spines, which form separate elements. Similar anatomy occurs in early tetrapods and stem-tetrapods such as Eusthenopteron.

The haemal arches were ancestrally present among lepidosaurs and are retained in modern tuataras and many lizards. Among snakes, the haemal arches are lost, though early members of the group retained the elements.

In 1956, Alfred Sherwood Romer hypothesized that the position of the first haemal arch was sexually dimorphic in crocodilians and dinosaurs. However, subsequent research established that the size and position of the first haemal arch was not sexually dimorphic in crocodilians and found no evidence of significant variation in tyrannosaurid dinosaurs, indicating that haemal arches could not be used to distinguish between sexes after all.

Haemal arches play an important role in the taxonomy of sauropod dinosaurs, as sauropods exhibit a wide range of morphologies of the haemal arches. In 1878, Othniel Marsh named the sauropod Diplodocus after the distinctive shape of its haemal arches, which were forked to have both an anterior and posterior process. Though once thought to be a specialized characteristic of Diplodocus and its close relatives, forked chevrons are now known to have been widespread among sauropod dinosaurs, although titanosauriform sauropods returned to the unforked condition.

Haemal arches are present among many mammals, including primates, cetaceans, pangolins, kangaroos, aardvarks, and more, but are typically absent in taxa with specialised or reduced tails (such as the platypus and elephants, respectively). A 2020 study identified 17 distinct chevron morphotypes among mammals, but found that chevron shape is not significantly linked to usage of the tail as a prop or prehensility.

In humans, vestigial cartilaginous haemal arches occur in embryonic development, but are later resorbed. They are typically absent in adult humans, but have been observed rarely. When present they occur on the first vertebra of the coccyx, and rarely on the second.

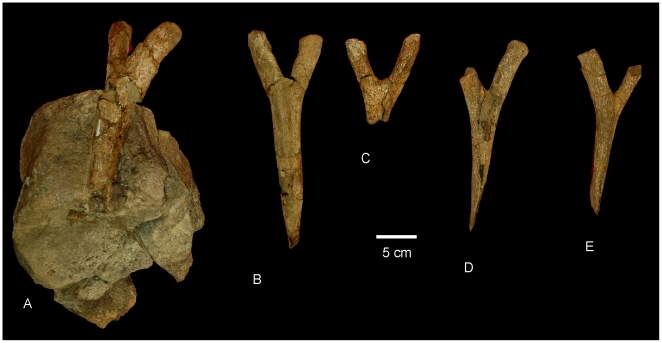
Haemal arches of Wintonotitan.

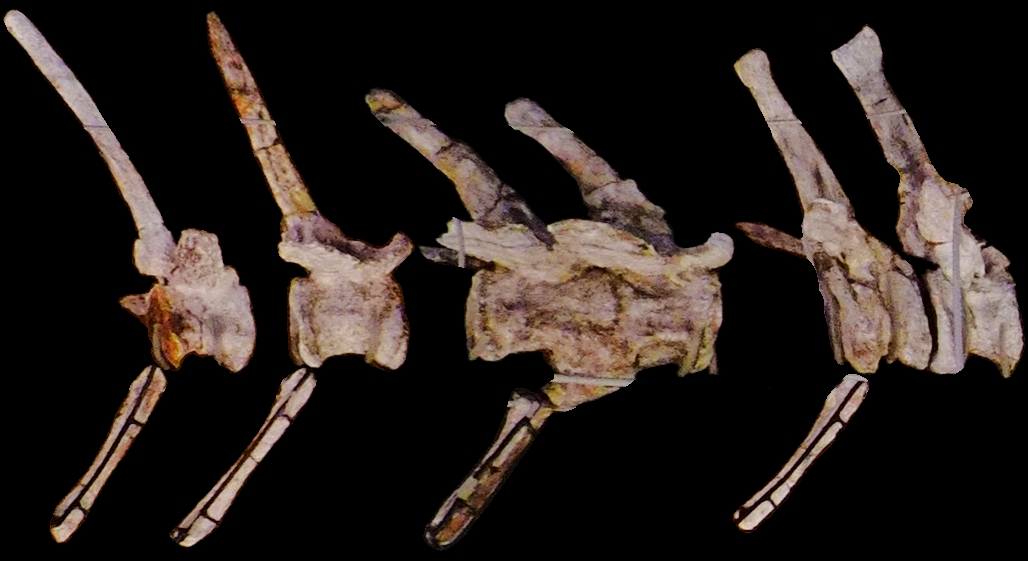
Caudal vertebrae of Ichthyovenator, showing haemal arches below tail.

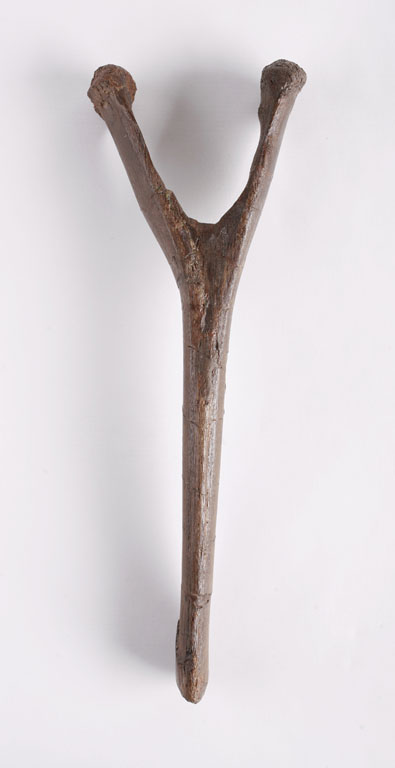
Haemal arch of Edmontosaurus.

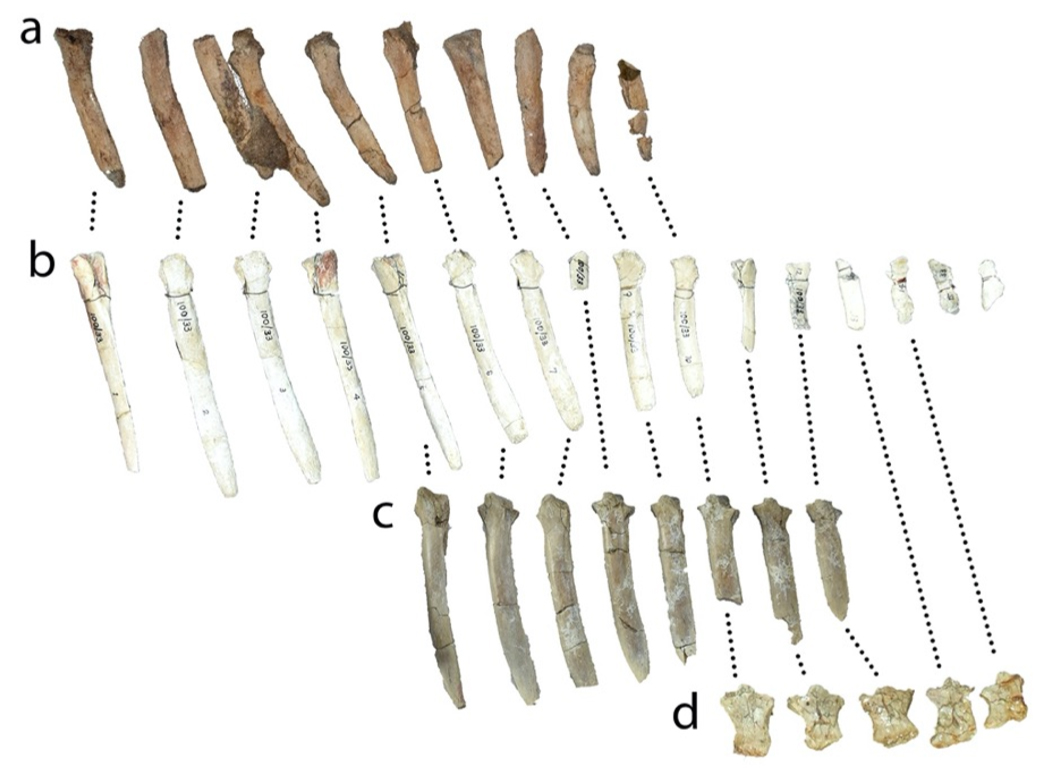
Haemal arch series of Oksoko and Rinchenia.

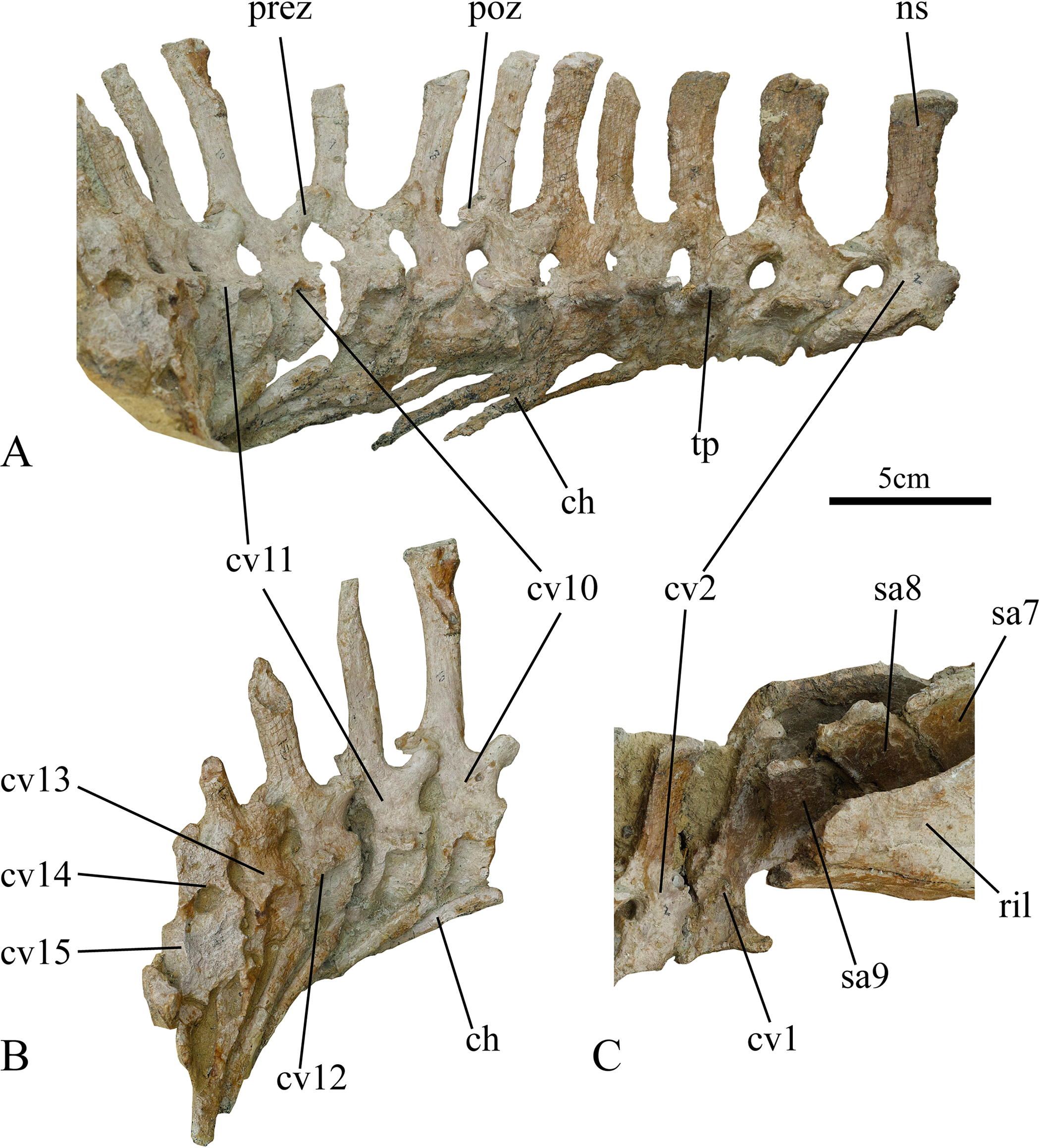
Caudal vertebrae of Ischioceratops, showing haemal arches below tail.

Tail of the Atlantic bottlenose dolphin with haemal arches below.
