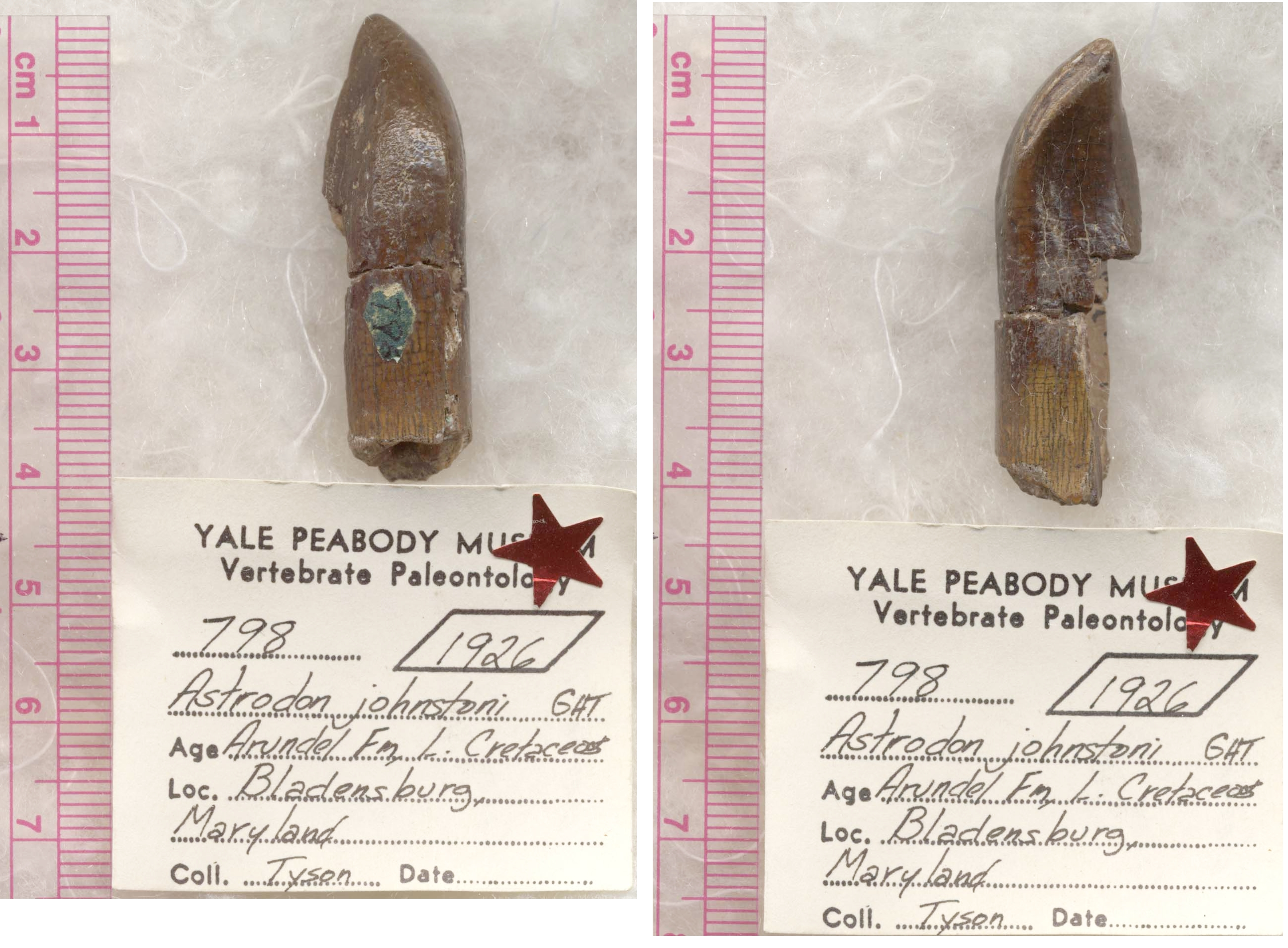
- A. johnstoni holotype tooth

Scientific classification
- Kingdom: Animalia
- Phylum: Chordata
- Class: Reptilia
- Clade: Dinosauria
- Clade: Saurischia
- Clade: †Sauropodomorpha
- Clade: †Sauropoda
- Clade: †Macronaria
- Clade: †Titanosauriformes
- Genus: †Astrodon; Leidy, 1865
- Species: †A. johnstoni

Binomial name
- †Astrodon johnstoni Leidy, 1865

Synonyms
- Pleurocoelus nanus Marsh, 1888; Pleurocoelus altus Marsh, 1888

= Astrodon =

Astrodon Temporal range: Early Cretaceous, 112 Ma

Extinct genus of dinosaurs

Astrodon is a genus of large herbivorous sauropod dinosaur, measuring 20 m (66 ft) in length, 9 m (30 ft) in height and 20 metric tons (22 short tons) in body mass. It lived in what is now the eastern United States during the Early Cretaceous period, and fossils have been found in the Arundel Formation, which has been dated through palynomorphs to the Albian about 112 to 110 million years ago.

== Discovery and species ==
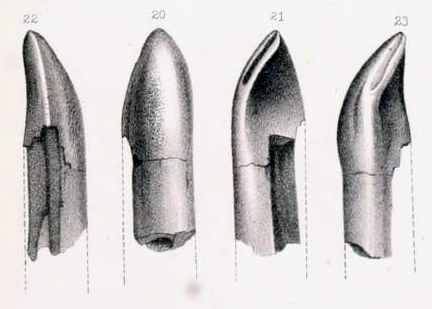
1865 lithograph of the A. johnstoni holotype tooth

Two dinosaur teeth were received in late November 1858 by chemist Philip Thomas Tyson from John D. Latchford. They had been found in Latchford's open iron ore pit in the Arundel Formation at Swampoodle near Muirkirk in Prince George's County, Maryland. Tyson let them be studied by the dentist Christopher Johnston, professor at the Baltimore Dental College, who cut one tooth in half and thereby discovered a characteristic star-formed cross-section. Johnston named Astrodon in 1859. However, he did not attach a specific epithet, so Joseph Leidy is credited with naming Astrodon johnstoni (the type species) in 1865, with as holotype specimen YPM 798. If Johnston had attached a specific epithet, it would have been the second dinosaur species identified in the United States. Johnston incorrectly stated that the site of the discovery had been an iron mine near the town of Bladensburg.

In 1888, O. C. Marsh named some bones from the Arundel found near Muirkirk, Maryland Pleurocoelus nanus and P. altus. However, in 1903 John Bell Hatcher, taking into account the similarity of the teeth of Astrodon johnstoni and the teeth from the Arundel Formation referred to Pleurocoelus nanus, argued that the latter represents the same species as the former and that the name Astrodon therefore had priority. In 1921 Charles W. Gilmore agreed that the genus Pleurocoelus is a junior synonym of Astrodon, but at the same time kept P. nanus and P. altus as separate species of Astrodon. Other species at one time assigned to the genus include Astrodon valdensis and Astrodon pussilus. In 1962 R. F. Kingham assigned Brachiosaurus, including all its species, to Astrodon as a subgenus. Carpenter and Tidwell (2005) accepted Hatcher's argument that there is only one species of sauropod dinosaur known from the Arundel Formation and that Astrodon johnstoni is the senior synonym of Pleurocoelus nanus (as well as P. altus) in the first in-depth description of this dinosaur. The majority of the bones of Astrodon are of juveniles, and Carpenter and Tidwell considered the two species named by Marsh, P. nanus and P. altus, as different growth stages of Astrodon johnstoni.

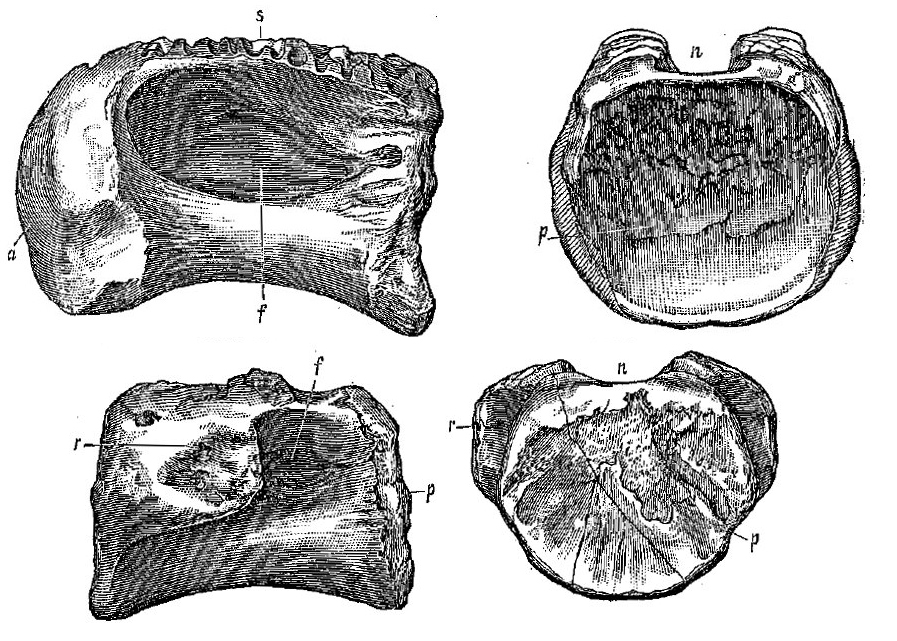
Vertebrae of Pleurocoelus nanus

However, other authors did not find the argument in favor of the synonymization of Astrodon and Pleurocoelus so convincing. According to Peter Rose (2007) it has not been demonstrated that either the teeth of Astrodon johnstoni or those attributed to Pleurocoelus are "morphologically diagnostic among titanosauriforms", which limits their utility when it comes to distinguishing them from the teeth of other taxa. The type series of Pleurocoelus nanus and P. altus (four vertebrae and two hindlimbs bones, respectively) cannot be directly compared to the teeth from the type series of Astrodon, so any comparison has to be conducted based on the referred specimens of Pleurocoelus. These, however, are all isolated bones from the Arundel Formation, which themselves were referred to Pleurocoelus only based "on proximity of the localities and the size of the bones". Rose concludes that, as Astrodon is not based on the diagnostic material, "new discoveries should not be aligned with that genus" and that "the argument to synonymize the two taxa, Astrodon and Pleurocoelus, seems unfounded". The type material of Pleurocoelus may not be diagnostic as well, according to the author.

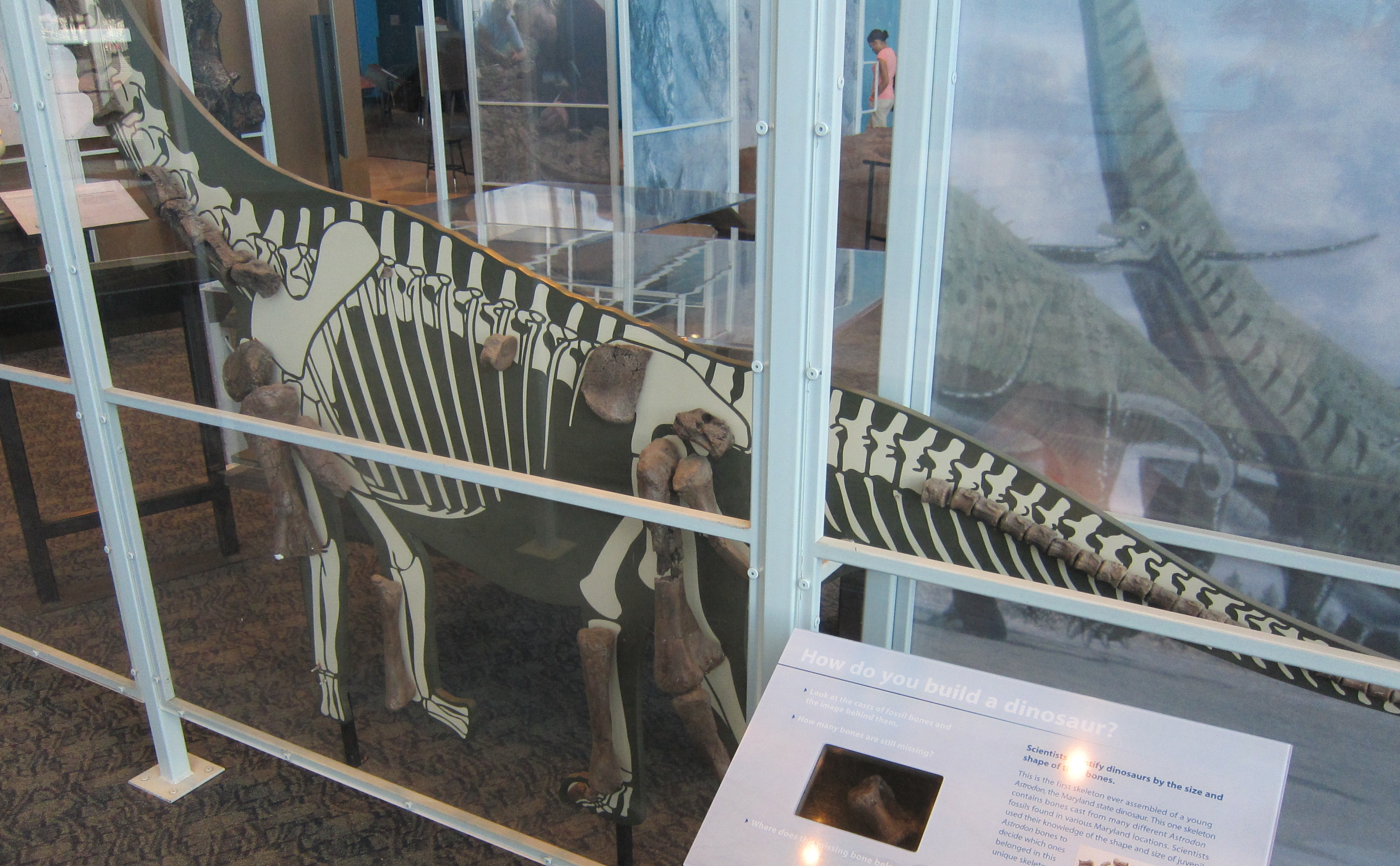
Composite juvenile skeleton in Maryland possibly belonging to this taxon

A similar argument was made by Michael D. d'Emic (2013). The author did not find any diagnostic features of the type material of Astrodon johnstoni, Pleurocoelus nanus and P. altus and considered the three taxa to be nomina dubia; according to the author there is no direct evidence that any sauropod bones from the Arundel Formation other than their type series can be referred to these taxa. D'Emic also stated that the exact provenance of the bones from the type series of Pleurocoelus nanus is uncertain and thus "these bones could represent a chimera of individuals or taxa". The author also commented on the diagnosis of Astrodon johnstoni proposed by Carpenter and Tidwell (which was based on all of the sauropod material from the Arundel Formation, not only on the teeth from the type series); he claimed that most of the supposed autapomorphies of this taxon "are indistinguishable compared to other sauropods such as Camarasaurus (...) and/or are related to the juvenile nature of the material".

== Paleoecology ==
=== Habitat ===
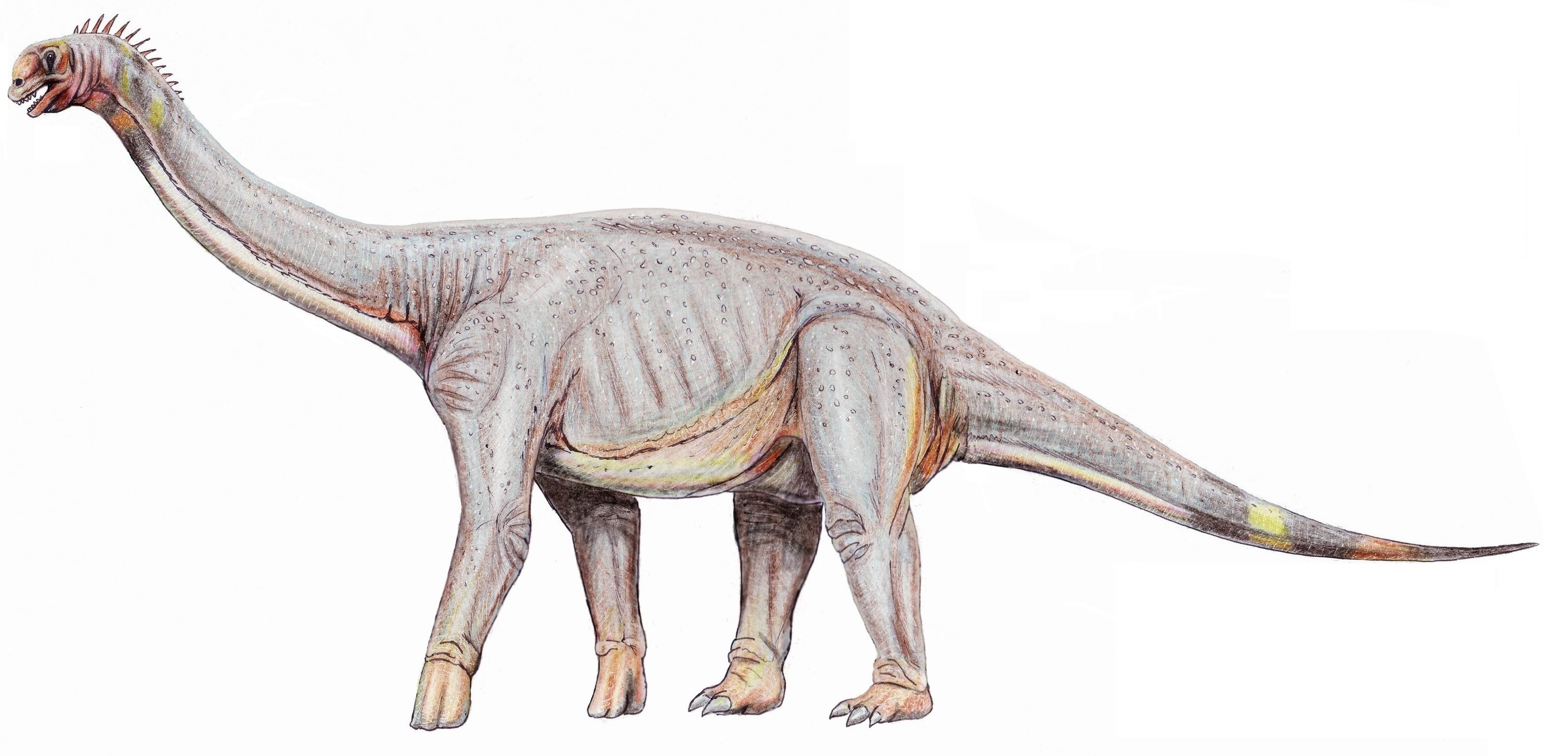
Hypothetical life restoration of A. johnstoni

The Arundel Formation of Maryland has been dated through palynomorphs to the Albian stage of the Early Cretaceous period, about 112 million years ago. This formation is part of the Potomac Group that includes formations not only in Maryland but also in parts of Washington D. C., Delaware and Virginia. The Arundel Formation was deposited on the edge of the expanding Atlantic Ocean basin. The region preserved in this formation was a broad, and generally flat plain with several streams running across it, probably similar to the modern day coastal regions of Alabama, Georgia, Louisiana and Mississippi.

Fossil material assigned to Astrodon has also been found in two Oklahoma localities of the Antlers Formation, which stretches from southwest Arkansas through southeastern Oklahoma and into northeastern Texas. This geological formation has not been dated radiometrically. Scientists have used biostratigraphic data and the fact that it shares several of the same genera as the Trinity Group of Texas, to surmise that this formation was laid down during the Albian stage of the Early Cretaceous Period, approximately 110 mya.

=== Paleofauna ===
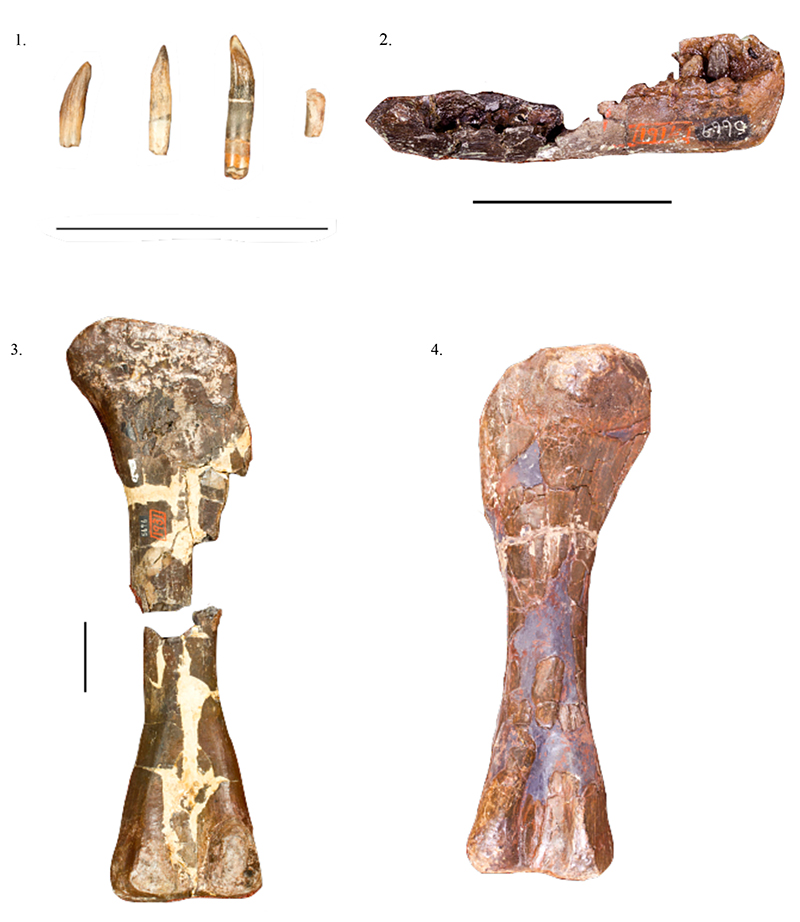
Selected elements of A. johnstoni

In what is now Maryland, Astrodon shared its paleoenvironment with dinosaurs such as coelurosaurians, the ankylosaurian Priconodon crassus, the nodosaurid Propanoplosaurus marylandicus, a possible basal ceratopsian, and potentially the ornithopod Tenontosaurus. The fossil evidence points to the presence of the poorly known theropods "Dryptosaurus" medius, Capitalsaurus potens, "Coelurus" gracilis, and the well known large theropod Acrocanthosaurus atokensis, which likely was the apex predator in this region. Other vertebrates are not as well known from the formation, but include freshwater sharks, lungfish, at least three genera of turtles including Glyptops caelatus, and the crocodyliform Goniopholis affinis. Evidence has shown that the multituberculate early mammal Argillomys marylandensis was also present. Trace fossils included theropod tracks known as Eubrontes and others assigned to the ichnogenus Pteraichnus belonging to a pterosaur, which demonstrate that these animals were present in abundance. The plant life known from this area included trees preserved as silicified wood, cycads like Dioonites, Ginkgo, the ground plant Selaginella and the giant redwood conifer Sequoia.

In prehistoric Oklahoma, Astrodon lived alongside other dinosaurs, such as the sauropod Sauroposeidon proteles, the dromaeosaurid Deinonychus antirrhopus and the carnosaur Acrocanthosaurus atokensis. The most common dinosaur in the paleoenvironment preserved in the Antlers Formation is the ornithopod Tenontosaurus. Other vertebrates present at the time of Astrodon included the amphibian Albanerpeton arthridion, the reptiles Atokasaurus metarsiodon and Ptilotodon wilsoni, the crurotarsan reptile Bernissartia, the cartilaginous fish Hybodus buderi and Lissodus anitae, the ray-finned fish Gyronchus dumblei, the crocodilian Goniopholis, and the turtles Glyptops and Naomichelys. Possible indeterminate bird remains are also known from this formation. The fossil evidence suggests that the gar Lepisosteus was the most common vertebrate in this region. The early mammals known from this region include Atokatherium boreni and Paracimexomys crossi.

== Cultural significance ==
In 1998, Astrodon johnstoni was named the state dinosaur of Maryland. Astrodon was also previously the state dinosaur of Texas, but has since been replaced with Sauroposeidon.

A life-sized Astrodon model (featuring a wound on its left rear leg) is displayed in the Terror of the South exhibit on the third floor of the North Carolina Museum of Natural Sciences. Another Astrodon model is also on display at the Maryland Science Center in Baltimore, Maryland.

Astrodon appeared in the book Raptor Red by Robert T. Bakker.

== See also ==
- List of Maryland state symbols
