= Bluff Dale Sandstone =

Geologic formation in Texas, United States

- Stratigraphic range: Early Cretaceous
- Type: Geological formation

Location
- Region: North America

The Bluff Dale Sandstone is a geological formation in Texas whose strata date back to the Early Cretaceous. Dinosaur remains are among the fossils that have been recovered from the formation.

== Vertebrate paleofauna ==
- Titanosauriformes indet. (previously assigned to Pleurocoelus)

== See also ==
- List of dinosaur-bearing rock formations
