= Cloverly Formation =

Geological formation in the United States

- Stratigraphic range: Late Berriasian - Early Cenomanian; ~140–98 Ma
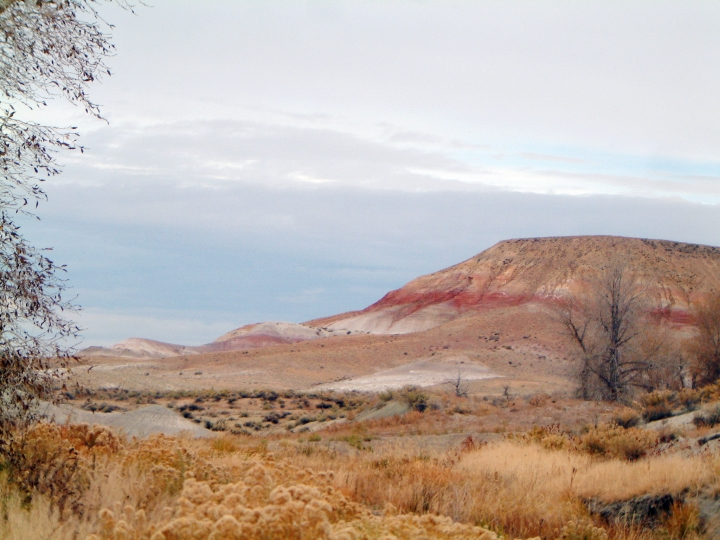
- Brightly colored strata of the Himes Member of the Cloverly Formation near Shell, Wyoming
- Type: Geological formation
- Sub-units: Pryor Conglomerate, Little Sheep Member, Himes Member
- Underlies: Thermopolis Shale
- Overlies: Morrison Formation
- Thickness: 150–400 ft (46–122 m)

Lithology
- Primary: Mudstone
- Other: Conglomerate, sandstone

Location
- Region: Wyoming, Montana, Colorado, Utah
- Country: United States

Type section
- Named for: Cloverly post office, Wyoming
- Named by: Nelson Horatio Darton, 1904

The Cloverly Formation is a geological formation of Early and Late Cretaceous age (Valanginian to Cenomanian stage) that is present in parts of Montana, Wyoming, Colorado and Utah in the western United States. It was named in 1904 by N. H. Darton for a post office on the eastern side of the Bighorn Basin. The sedimentary rocks of formation were deposited in floodplain environments and contain vertebrate fossils, including a diverse assemblage of dinosaur remains. In 1973, the Cloverly Formation Site was designated as a National Natural Landmark by the National Park Service.

== Stratigraphy ==
The Cloverly Formation rests disconformably on the Morrison Formation and is conformably overlain by the Thermopolis Shale. It is subdivided into a variety of members, depending on the location. In the Bighorn Basin along the Montana-Wyoming border, Moberly (1960) divided the Cloverly into the following three members:

- The Pryor Conglomerate lies at the base and contains abundant black chert. It is named from thick beds exposed on the west side of the Pryor Mountains.
- The Little Sheep Member lies in the middle and is composed of pale-purple, gray to almost white, bentonitic mudstone.
- The uppermost unit is the Himes Member, which contains some coarse-grained channel sandstone deposits, but consists primarily of brightly multicolored (variegated) mudstones.

In contrast, Ostrom (1970) divided the formation into four units, which he named Units IV-VII:

- Unit IV equates to the Pryor Conglomerate of Moberly and consists of a conglomerate or conglomeratic sandstone.
- Unit V, overlaying Unit IV, consists of a lower grey-to-purple claystone with abundant fist-sized chalcedony and barite concretions; the unit is highly bentonitic and contains occasional channel sands.
- Unit VI is a discontinuous "salt and pepper" cross-stratified channel sandstone with occasional conglomerate, considered by Moberly to be part of the Himes Member.
- Unit VII, the uppermost, is a maroon to orange claystone with occasional highly rounded and polished pebbles of silica.

== Age ==
A stratigraphic revision of the Cloverly Formation using new uranium lead dates reinterpret the formation as spanning the Valanginian-Cenomanian stages of the Cretaceous period. The individual ages of the members are listed below:

- Pryor Conglomerate; 140-130 Ma (Valanginian-Hauterivian)
- Little Sheep Member; 130-124 Ma (marine section) (Hauterivian-Barremian) and 124-109 Ma (terrestrial section) (Barremian-Albian)
- Himes Member; 109-98 Ma (Albian-Cenomanian)

== Depositional environment ==
The sediments of the Cloverly Formation were deposited in alluvial and floodplain environments. The basal conglomerates probably represent braided river deposits, while the sandstones were deposited in fluvial channels. The mudstones that contain most of the fossils represent overbank, lacustrine, and pedogenic deposits.

== Vertebrate fauna ==
Animals recovered include the dinosaurs Deinonychus, Microvenator, Tenontosaurus, Zephyrosaurus and Sauropelta as well as fragmentary remains of Titanosaurs, Ankylosaurs and Ornithomimids. As well, two genera of turtle Naomichelys and Glyptops and the lungfish Ceratodus. At least three types of dinosaur eggshells have been reported from this formation.

References for data: Ostrom 1970; Cifelli et al. 1998; Cifelli 1999; Nydam and Cifelli 2002. Possible goniopholidid remains are known from the formation.

=== Dinosaurs ===
==== Ornithischians ====
===== Ankylosaurs =====
Ankylosaurs reported from the Cloverly Formation
Genus	Species	State	Stratigraphic position	Material	Notes	Images
Sauropelta	S. edwardsorum	Montana; Wyoming	Cloverly V; Little Sheep Mudstone MemberHimes Member	Known from "several articulated skeletons" and common armor plates. Only one partial skull is known.	Articulated skeletons are often encased in carbonate caliche deposits that require acid to be removed safely.	
Tatankacephalus	T. cooneyorum	Montana	Cloverly VII	Partial cranium, rib fragments, and osteoderms.	Originally described as an ankylosaurid but has since been reclassified as a nodosaurid.	

===== Ceratopsians =====
Ceratopsians reported from the Cloverly Formation
Genus	Species	State	Stratigraphic position	Material	Notes	Images
Aquilops	A. americanus	Montana	Cloverly VII; Himes Member		A basal neoceratopsian.	Aquilops

===== Ornithopods =====
Ornithopods reported from the Cloverly Formation
Genus	Species	State	Stratigraphic position	Material	Notes	Images
Tenontosaurus	T. tilleti	Montana; Wyoming		Its remains are the most common of any dinosaur of the formation.	Juvenile remains are sometimes found together, suggesting that young Tenontosaurus lived in sibling groups. Deinonychus teeth are sometimes associated with Tenontosaurus, suggesting a predator-prey relationship between the two.	Tenontosaurus
Zephyrosaurus	Z. schaffi	Montana	Himes Member	Its remains are "very rare."	An orodromine Thescelosaurid.	Zephyrosaurus

==== Saurischians ====
Theropod eggshell fragments are known from the formation. Unidentifiable ornithomimid remains are present and most commonly represented by toe bones. Indeterminate allosauroid remains are known from the formation. Remains identified by John Ostrom as Ornithomimus are suspected by Jack Horner to be of a new ornithomimid genus. Possible remains of a microraptorian, a troodontid, and a basal tyrannosauroid similar to Moros have also been found here as well.

Color key: Taxon / Reclassified taxon / Taxon falsely reported as present / Dubious taxon or junior synonym / Ichnotaxon / Ootaxon / Morphotaxon	Notes; Uncertain or tentative taxa are in small text; ~~crossed out~~ taxa are discredited.

===== Sauropods =====
Sauropods reported from the Cloverly Formation
Genus	Species	State	Stratigraphic position	Material	Notes	Images
Rugocaudia	R. cooneyi	Montana	Cloverly VII; Himes Member	A partial skeleton consisting of 18 caudal vertebrae and associated material, including an isolated neural arch, tooth, chevron, and distal section of a metacarpal.	A dubious specimen of a titanosauriformes	Sauroposeidon
Sauroposeidon	S. proteles	Wyoming	Cloverly VII; Himes Member		A huge sauropod within Somphospondyli	Sauroposeidon

===== Theropods =====
Theropods reported from the Cloverly Formation
Genus	Species	State	Stratigraphic position	Material	Notes	Images
Acrocanthosaurus	A. atokensis	Wyoming	Cloverly VII; Himes Member	A partial skeleton consists of a dorsal vertebral centrum, caudal vertebral neural arch, right and left pubes, right femur, proximal right fibula, and several fragments.	A carcharodontosaurid.	Acrocanthosaurus Deinonychus Microvenator
Deinonychus	D. antirrhopus	Montana; Wyoming		Its remains are "very rare."	A dromaeosaur. Tenontosaurus remains have been recovered in association with Deinonychus teeth, suggesting a predator-prey relationship between the two.	Acrocanthosaurus Deinonychus Microvenator
Microvenator	M. celer	Montana; Wyoming	Himes Member	Its remains are "extremely rare." Known only from a "[p]artial skeleton with partial skull." The specimen lacks feet and is catalogued as AMNH 3041.	An oviraptorosaur. A type specimen AMNH 3041 was recovered by Barnum Brown from Cloverly strata in Montana in 1933.	Acrocanthosaurus Deinonychus Microvenator
Ornithomimus	O. velox	Montana; Wyoming			Later found to be indeterminate ornithomimid remains.	Acrocanthosaurus Deinonychus Microvenator

=== Mammals ===
Mammals reported from the Cloverly Formation
Genus	Species	State	Stratigraphic position	Material	Notes	Images
Astroconodon	A. sp.				Previously referred as "Cloverly triconodont"	Gobiconodon
cf. Atokatheridium	Indeterminate					Gobiconodon
Bryceomys	B. sp.					Gobiconodon
Corviconodon	C. montanensis					Gobiconodon
Gobiconodon	G. ostromi					Gobiconodon
Janumys	J. sp.					Gobiconodon
Montanalestes	M. keeblerorum					Gobiconodon
cf. Oklatheridium	Indeterminate					Gobiconodon
cf. Paracimexomys	Indeterminate					Gobiconodon
Spalacotheriidae	Indeterminate					Gobiconodon

=== Crocodyliforms ===
Crocodyliforms reported from the Cloverly Formation
Genus	Species	State	Stratigraphic position	Material	Notes
cf. Atoposauridae	Indeterminate				
cf. Bernissartidae	Indeterminate				
cf. Goniopholididae	Indeterminate				
cf. Pholidosauridae	Indeterminate				

=== Turtles ===
Turtles reported from the Cloverly Formation
Genus	Species	State	Stratigraphic position	Material	Notes
Cryptodira	Indeterminate				
"Glyptops"	"G". pervicax				
Naomichelys	N. speciosa				
Testudinata	Indeterminate				

=== Lepidosaurs ===
Lepidosaurs reported from the Cloverly Formation
Genus	Species	State	Stratigraphic position	Material	Notes
Paramacellodus	P. keebleri				
Paramacellodidae?	Indeterminate				
Ptilotodon	P. wilsoni				Also known from the Antlers Formation
Teiidae	Indeterminate				

=== Amphibians ===
Amphibians reported from the Cloverly Formation
Genus	Species	State	Stratigraphic position	Material	Notes	Images
Albanerpeton	A. ektopistikon					Albanerpeton
Anura	Indeterminate					Albanerpeton
Batrachosauroididae	Indeterminate					Albanerpeton
Ostrombatrachos	O. nodos					Albanerpeton
cf. Scapherpetontidae	Indeterminate					Albanerpeton
cf. Scotiophryne	Indeterminate					Albanerpeton

=== Bony fish ===
Osteichthyes reported from the Cloverly Formation
Genus	Species	State	Stratigraphic position	Material	Notes	Images
Ceratodus	C. frazieri					Ceratodus
Ceratodus	C. nirumbee					Ceratodus
aff. Lepidotes	Indeterminate					Ceratodus
aff. Pycnodontidae	Indeterminate					Ceratodus
Vidalamiinae	Indeterminate					Ceratodus

=== Cartilaginous fish ===
Chondrichthyes reported from the Cloverly Formation
Genus	Species	State	Stratigraphic position	Material	Notes
Egertonodus	E. sp.				
Hybodus	H. parvidens				
Lonchidion	L. sp.				
Parvodus	P. sp.				
Pseudohypolophus	P. sp.				

== See also ==
- List of dinosaur-bearing rock formations
- Cloverly Fauna
