= Twin Mountains Formation =

Geological formation in Texas

- Stratigraphic range: Aptian
- Type: Geological formation
- Unit of: Trinity Group
- Underlies: Glen Rose Formation
- Thickness: 150 ft (46 m)

Lithology
- Primary: Claystone, sandstone
- Other: Conglomerate

Location
- Region: Texas
- Country: United States

The Twin Mountains Formation, also known as the Twin Mak Formation, is a sedimentary rock formation, within the Trinity Group, found in Texas of the United States of America. It is a terrestrial formation of Aptian age (Lower Cretaceous), and is notable for its dinosaur fossils. Dinosaurs from this formation include the large theropod Acrocanthosaurus, the sauropod Sauroposeidon, as well as the ornithopods Tenontosaurus and Convolosaurus. It is the lowermost unit of the lower Cretaceous, lying unconformably on Carboniferous strata. It is overlain by the Glen Rose Formation. It is the lateral equivalent of the lower part of the Antlers Formation.

== Paleobiota ==
- Acrocanthosaurus atokensis
- Convolosaurus marri
- Sauroposeidon proteles
- Tarsomordeo winkleri
- Tenontosaurus dossi - "Skull and postcranial skeleton, several individuals."
- Dromaeosauridae indet.
- Iguanodontia indet.
- Ornithocheiroidea indet.
- Sauropoda indet.
- Theropoda indet.
