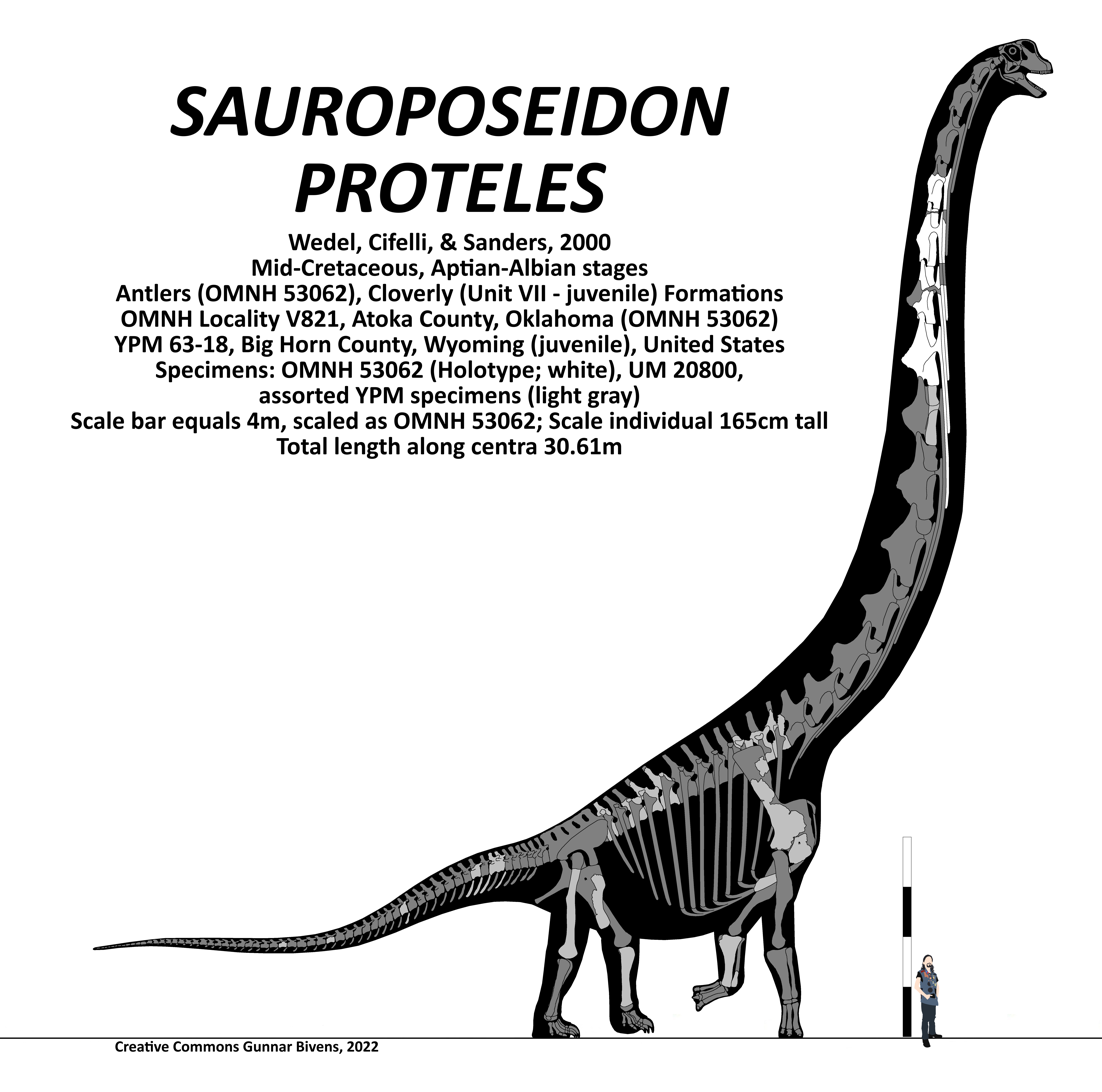
- Skeletal reconstruction of the holotype of S. proteles

Scientific classification
- Kingdom: Animalia
- Phylum: Chordata
- Class: Reptilia
- Clade: Dinosauria
- Clade: Saurischia
- Clade: †Sauropodomorpha
- Clade: †Sauropoda
- Clade: †Eusauropoda
- Clade: †Macronaria
- Clade: †Somphospondyli
- Genus: †Sauroposeidon; Wedel, Cifelli & Sanders, 2000
- Species: †S. proteles

Binomial name
- †Sauroposeidon proteles Wedel, Cifelli & Sanders, 2000

Synonyms
- Superposeidon Brochu, Long, McHenry, Scanlon, & Willis, 2002 (lapsus calami); Paluxysaurus jonesi Rose, 2007

= Sauroposeidon =

Sauroposeidon Temporal range: Early Cretaceous (Aptian–Albian), 113–110 Ma

Genus of Early Cretaceous sauropod

Sauroposeidon (/ˌsɔːroʊpoʊˈsaɪdən/ SOR-o-po-SY-dən; "Earthquake god lizard" Σαύρος (Sávrōs) meaning "lizard" and Ποσειδώνας (Pōseidónas) after the Greek god Poseidon) is a genus of sauropod dinosaur known from several incomplete specimens including a bone bed and fossilized trackways that have been found in the U.S. states of Oklahoma, Wyoming, and Texas.

The fossils were found in rocks dating from near the end of the Early Cretaceous (Aptian–early Albian), from about 113 to 110 million years ago, a time when sauropod diversity in North America had greatly diminished. Alongside Abydosaurus and Sonorasaurus, it was one of the last known North American sauropod prior to an absence of the group on the continent of roughly 40 million years that ended with the appearance of Alamosaurus during the Maastrichtian.

While the holotype remains were initially discovered in 1994, due to their unexpected age and unusual size they were initially misclassified as pieces of petrified wood. A more detailed analysis in 1999 revealed their true nature which resulted in a minor media frenzy, and formal publication of the find the following year.

Paleoecological analysis indicates that Sauroposeidon lived on the shores of the Gulf of Mexico, in a river delta. Extrapolations based on the more completely known Brachiosaurus indicate that the head of Sauroposeidon could reach 16.5–18 m (54–59 ft) in height with its neck extended, which would make it one of the tallest known dinosaurs. With an estimated length of 27–34 m (89–112 ft) and a mass of 40–60 t (44–66 short tons), it also ranks among the longest and heaviest. However, this animal may not be as closely related to Brachiosaurus as previously thought, so these estimates may be inaccurate.

While initially described as a brachiosaurid closely related to Brachiosaurus and Giraffatitan, the discovery of additional remains in the Cloverly Formation of Wyoming suggested that it was in fact more closely related to the titanosaurs, in the group Somphospondyli. Analysis of these remains and comparison with others from Texas supported this conclusion, and demonstrated that the more completely known sauropods from the Twin Mountains Formation (including a partial skull and fossil trackways) previously named Paluxysaurus jonesi also belonged to Sauroposeidon. It is the state dinosaur of Texas.

== Discovery ==
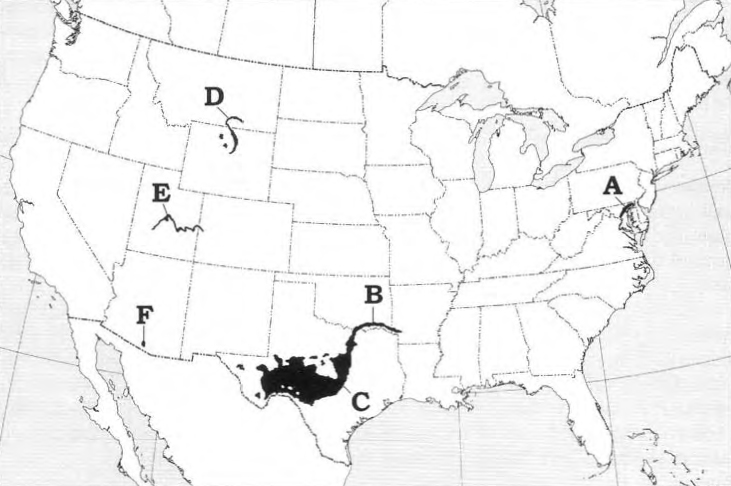
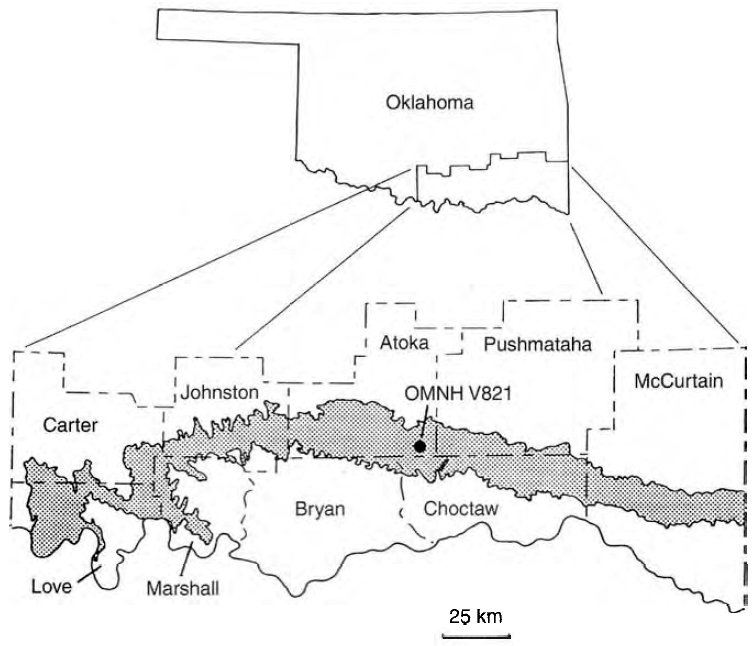
Sauropod distribution in the Early Cretaceous of North America (left, B is the Antlers Formation), and location of the holotype in the formation

The first fossils classified as Sauroposeidon were four neck vertebrae discovered in rural Oklahoma, not far from the Texas border, in a claystone outcrop that dates the fossils to about 110 million years ago (mya). This falls within the Early Cretaceous Period, specifically between the Aptian and Albian epochs. These vertebrae were discovered in May 1994 at the Antlers Formation in Atoka County, Oklahoma by dog trainer Bobby Cross and secured by Dr. Richard Cifelli and a team from the Oklahoma Museum of Natural History in May 1994 and August 1994. Initially the fossils were believed to be simply too large to be the remains of an animal, and due to the state of preservation, believed to be tree trunks. In fact, they are the longest such bones known in dinosaurs. Thus, the vertebrae were stored until 1999, when Dr. Cifelli gave them to a graduate student, Matt Wedel, to analyze as part of a project. Upon their realization of the find's significance, they issued a press release in October 1999, followed by official publication of their findings in the Journal of Vertebrate Paleontology in March 2000. The new species was named S. proteles, and the holotype is OMNH 53062. It garnered immediate media attention leading to some sources calling it inaccurately the largest dinosaur ever.

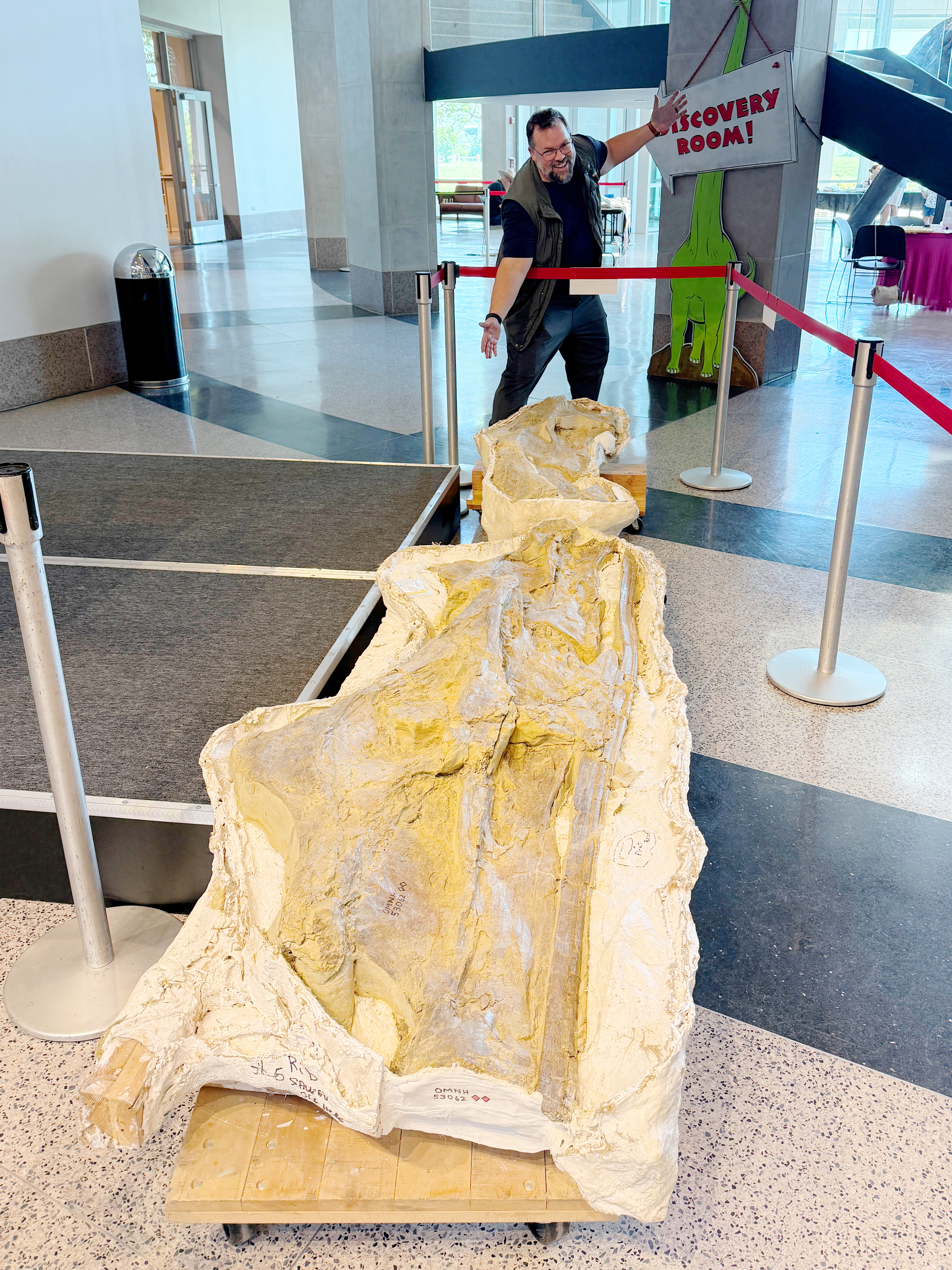
Lead-author Matt Wedel with the holotype vertebrae in 2026

The generic name comes from sauros (Greek σαύρος for "lizard"), and Poseidon (Ποσειδών), the sea god in Greek mythology, who is also associated with earthquakes, that facet styled as Ennosigaios or Enosikhthōn, "Earthshaker". This is a reference to the notion that a sauropod's weight was so great that the ground shook as it walked. The specific descriptor proteles also comes from the Ancient Greek πρωτέλης and means "perfect before the end", which refers to Sauroposeidon's status as the last and most specialized giant sauropod known in North America, during the Early Cretaceous. In 2012, numerous other sauropod remains that had been known for decades under various different names were also classified in the genus Sauroposeidon. Sauropod bones and trackways had long been known from the Paluxy River area of Texas, usually referred to the genus Pleurocoelus, including partial skeletons (particularly from the Glen Rose Formation, above the Twin Mountains Formation). In the mid-1980s, students from the University of Texas at Austin discovered a bonebed on a ranch in Hood County, but early work stopped in 1987. The quarry was reopened in 1993 and was subsequently worked by parties from Southern Methodist University, the Fort Worth Museum of Science and History, and Tarleton State University. All sauropod remains from this bonebed appear to come from the same genus of sauropod. Petrified logs are also known from the site. The site was fluvial when its rocks were being deposited, with channel sands and muds, and concretions of calcite-cemented sandstone containing fossils. Following excavation and preparation of the majority of the fossils from the site, its sauropod species was given the name Paluxysaurus jonesi.

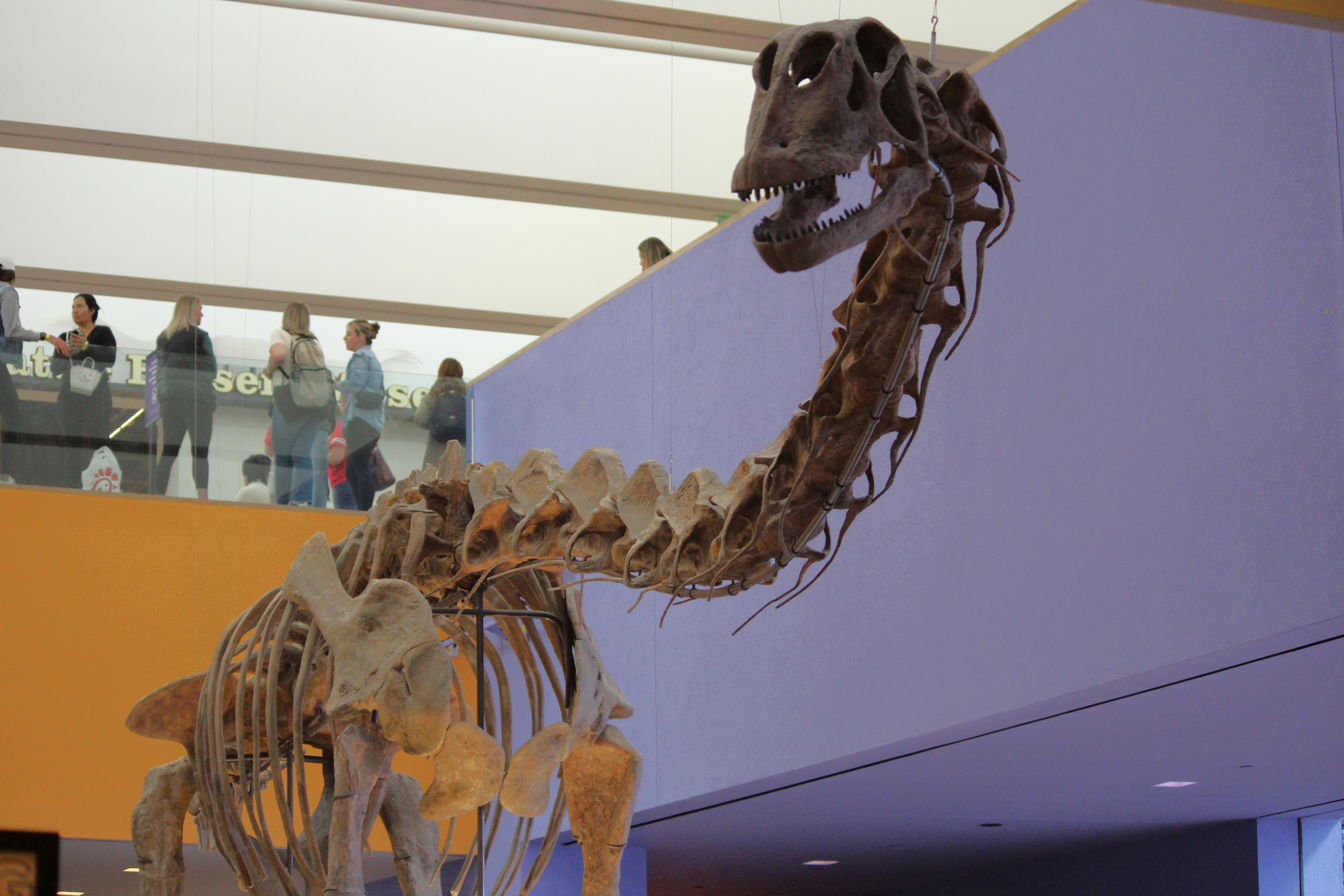
Skeletal reconstruction of "Paluxysaurus" at the Fort Worth Museum of Science and History

The name Paluxysaurus was based on the specimen FWMSH 93B-10-18, a partial skull including an associated left maxilla, nasal, and teeth. Other bones from the quarry included a partial neck of seven vertebrae, thirteen vertebrae from the back and 30 from the tail, and examples of all limb and girdle bones except some hand and foot bones. It was distinguished from all other sauropods by vertebral details, and has various morphological differences in other bones compared to other sauropods of the Early Cretaceous of North America. The genus was limited to the bonebed remains; for example, the partial skeleton from Wise County known as Pleurocoelus sp. (SMU 61732) is not referred to Paluxysaurus; instead that specimen is the holotype of Astrophocaudia slaughteri D'Emic 2012, another somphospondylan sauropod. There are differences in the remains of P. sp. and Paluxysaurus, but they cannot be distinguished with confidence. In 2012, re-analysis of these specimens in light of additional Sauroposeidon remains led paleontologists D'Emic and Foreman to conclude that Paluxysaurus was the same animal as Sauroposeidon, and thus a junior synonym of S. proteles.

== Description ==
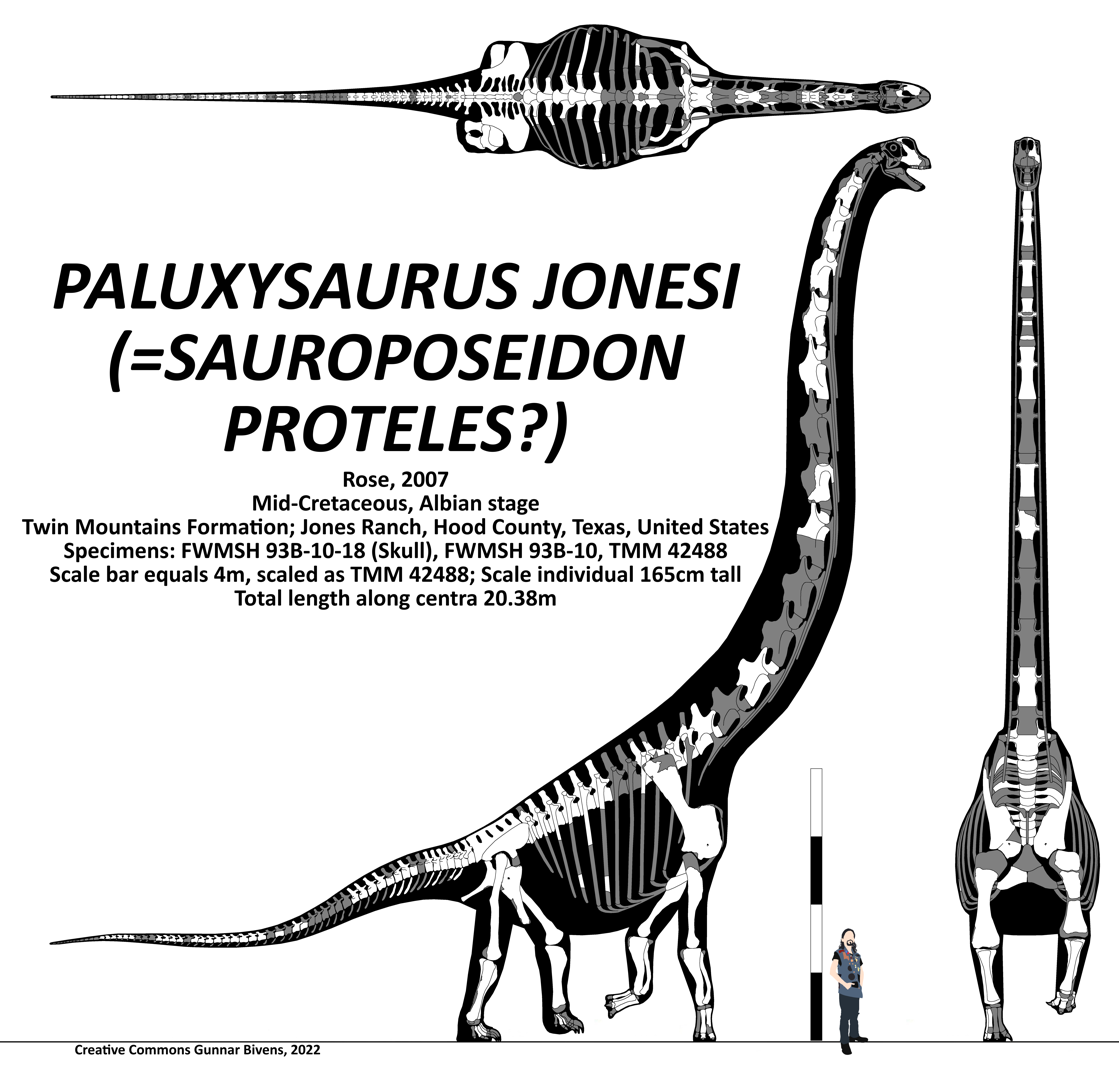
Multiview skeletal reconstruction of the Jones Ranch sauropod material.

The original Sauroposeidon find was composed of four articulated, mid-cervical vertebrae (numbers 5 to 8), with the cervical ribs in place. The vertebrae are extremely elongated, with the largest one having an overall length of 1.4 m (4.6 ft), making it the longest sauropod neck vertebra on record. Examination of the bones revealed that they are honeycombed with tiny air cells, and are very thin, like the bones of a chicken or an ostrich, making the neck lighter and easier to lift. The cervical ribs were remarkably long as well, with the longest measurable rib (on vertebra 6) measuring 3.42 m (11.2 ft) – about 18% longer than the longest rib reported for Giraffatitan, but exceeded in length by the cervical ribs of Mamenchisaurus.

Estimates of Sauroposeidon's size are based on a comparison between the four Sauroposeidon vertebrae and the vertebrae of the HM SII specimen of Giraffatitan brancai, located in the Berlin's Natural History Museum. The HM SII is the most complete brachiosaur known, though since it is composed of pieces from different individuals its proportions may not be totally accurate. Comparisons to the other relatives of Sauroposeidon are difficult due to limited remains. The neck length of Sauroposeidon is estimated at 11.25–12 m (37–39 ft), compared to a neck length of 9 m (30 ft) for the HM SII Giraffatitan. This is based on the assumption that the rest of the neck has the same proportions as Giraffatitan, which is a reasonably good conjecture.

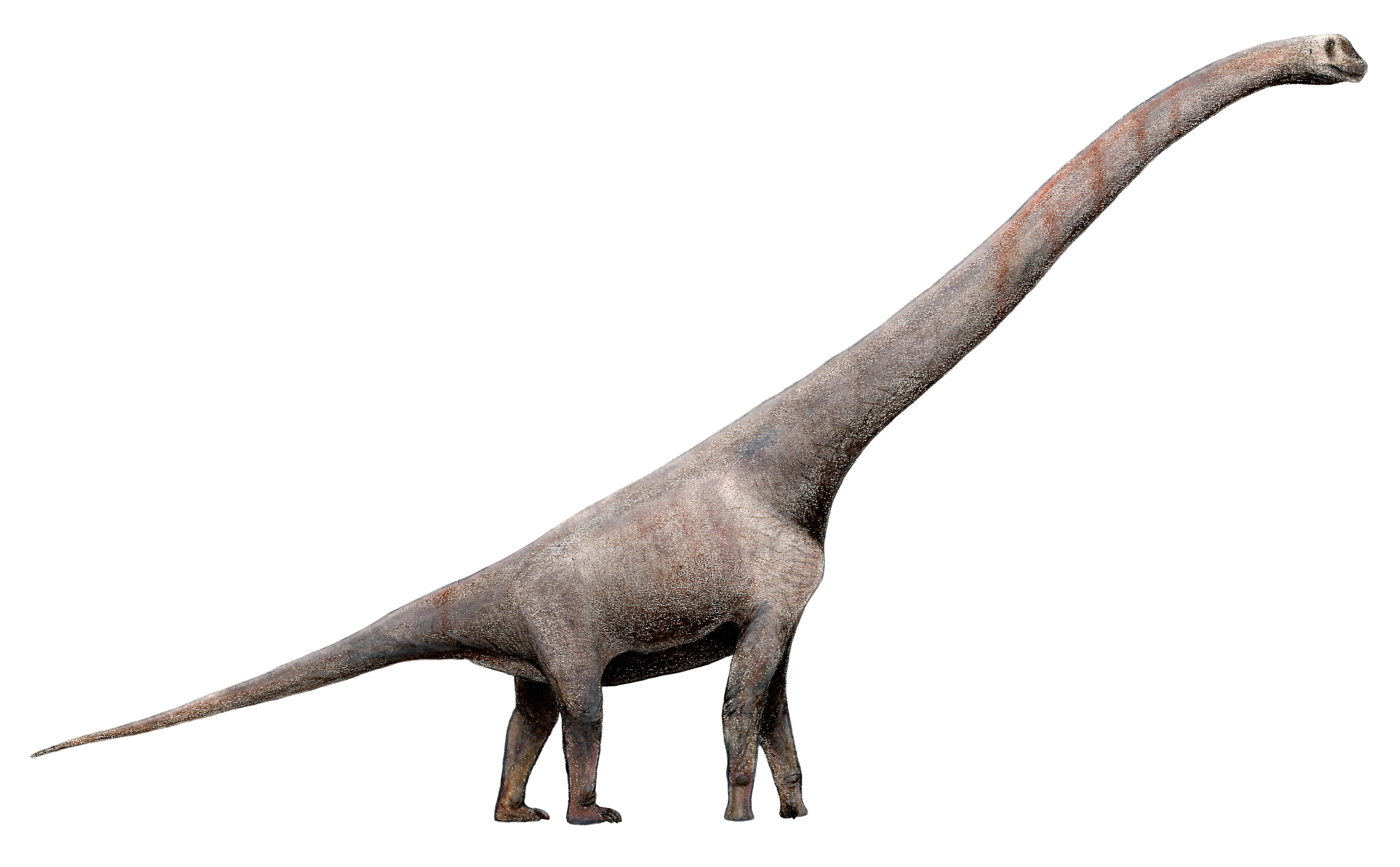
Hypothetical life restoration

Sauroposeidon was probably able to raise its head 16.5–18 m (54–59 ft) above the ground, which is as high as a six-story building. In comparison, Giraffatitan could probably raise its head 13.5 m (44 ft) into the air.

Sauroposeidon's shoulder height has been estimated at 6–7 m (20–23 ft) based on an interpretation of the animal as a brachiosaurid. Estimates of its total possible length have ranged from 27 m (89 ft) to 34 m (112 ft).

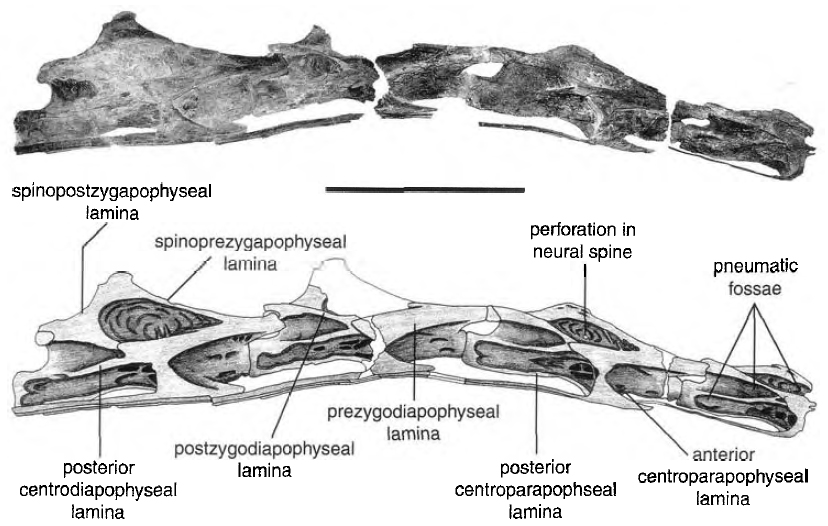
Neck vertebrae and diagram

The mass of Sauroposeidon is estimated at 40–60 t (44–66 short tons). While the vertebrae of Sauroposeidon are 25–33% longer than Giraffatitan', they are only 10–15% larger in diameter. This means that while Sauroposeidon probably has a larger body than Giraffatitan its body is smaller in comparison to the size of its neck, so it did not weigh as much as a scaled-up Giraffatitan. By comparison, Giraffatitan might have weighed 36–40 t (40–44 short tons). This estimate of the Giraffatitan is an average of several different methodologies.

However, Sauroposeidon has a gracile neck compared to Giraffatitan. If the rest of the body turns out to be similarly slender, the mass estimate may be too high. This could be similar to the way the relatively robust Apatosaurus weighs far more than the longer but much slimmer Diplodocus. In addition, it is possible that sauropods may have had an air sac system, like those in birds, which could reduce all sauropod mass estimates by 20% or more.

== Paleoecology ==
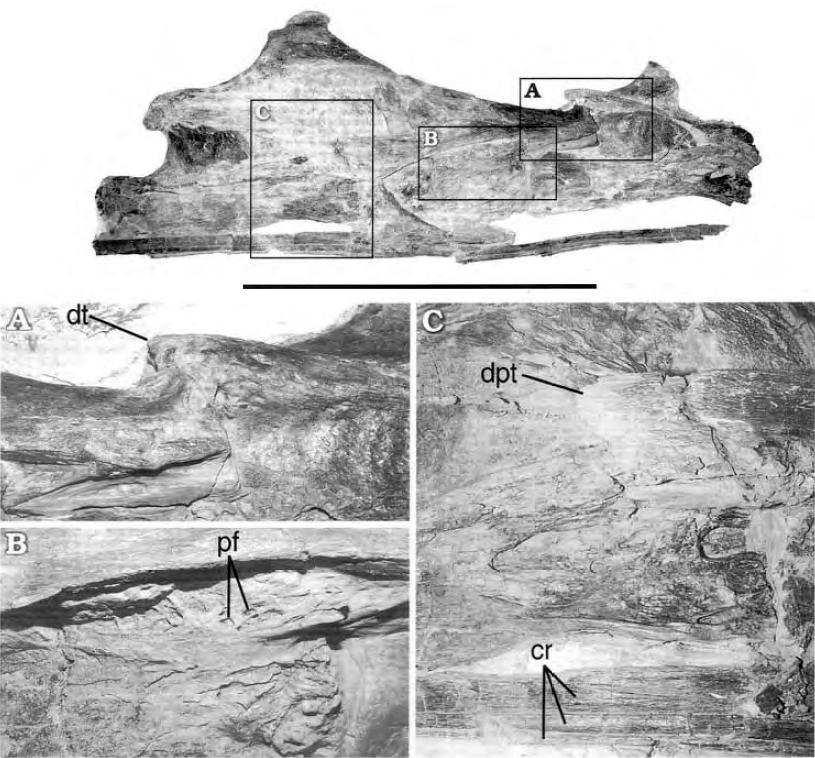
Detailed anatomy of Sauroposeidon vertebrae

Sauroposeidon was an unexpected discovery, because it was a huge, gas-guzzling barge of an animal in an age of subcompact sauropods.

— Matt Wedel, Sauroposeidon team leader

Sauropods, which include the largest terrestrial animals of all time, were a very wide-ranging and successful group. They first appeared in the Early Jurassic and soon spread across the world. By the time of the late Jurassic, North America and Africa were dominated by the diplodocids and brachiosaurids and, by the end of the Late Cretaceous, titanosaurids were widespread (though only in the southern hemisphere). Between these periods, in the Early Cretaceous, the fossil record is sparse. Few specimens have been found in North America from that time and those specimens that do exist are often fragmentary or represent juvenile members of their species. Most of the surviving sauropods at the time were also shrinking in size to a mere 15 m (49 ft) in length, and maybe 10–15 t (11–17 short tons), which makes the discovery of an extremely specialized super-giant like Sauroposeidon very unusual.

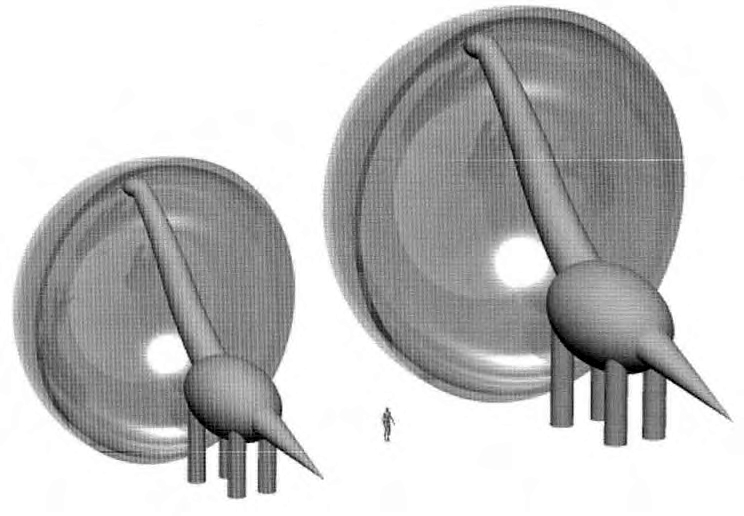
The feeding range of Giraffatitan and Sauroposeidon

Sauroposeidon lived on the shores of the Gulf of Mexico, which ran through Oklahoma at that time, in a vast river delta similar to the Mississippi delta today. This paleoenvironment, which has been preserved in the Antlers Formation, also stretches from southwest Arkansas through southeastern Oklahoma and into northeastern Texas. This geological formation has not been dated radiometrically. Scientists have used biostratigraphic data and the fact that it shares several of the same genera as the Trinity Group of Texas, to surmise that this formation was laid down during the Aptian and Albian stages of the Early Cretaceous Period, approximately 110 mya. The area preserved in this formation was a large floodplain that drained into a shallow inland sea. Several million years later, this sea would expand to the north, becoming the Western Interior Seaway and dividing North America in two for nearly the entire Late Cretaceous period. The paleoenvironment of Sauroposeidon consisted of tropical or sub-tropical forests, river deltas, coastal swamps, bayous and lagoons, probably similar to that of modern-day Louisiana. There were few predators which could attempt to attack a full-grown Sauroposeidon, but juveniles were likely to be preyed on by the contemporary Acrocanthosaurus atokensis (a carnosaur slightly smaller than a Tyrannosaurus), which likely were the apex predators in this region, and the small dromaeosaur Deinonychus antirrhopus. Sauroposeidon also shared its paleoenvironment with other dinosaurs, such as the sauropod Astrodon (Pleurocoelus) and the most common dinosaur in this region, the ornithopod Tenontosaurus. Other vertebrates present during this time included the amphibian Albanerpeton arthridion, the reptiles Atokasaurus metarsiodon and Ptilotodon wilsoni, the cartilaginous fish Hybodus buderi and Lissodus anitae, the ray-finned fish Gyronchus dumblei, the crocodilians Goniopholis, Bernissartia, and Paluxysuchus, and the turtles Glyptops and Naomichelys. Possible indeterminate bird remains are also known from the Antlers Formation. The fossil evidence suggests that the gar Lepisosteus was the most common vertebrate in this region. The early mammals known from this region included Atokatheridium boreni and Paracimexomys crossi.
