= Matt Wedel =

American paleontologist

Mathew J. Wedel
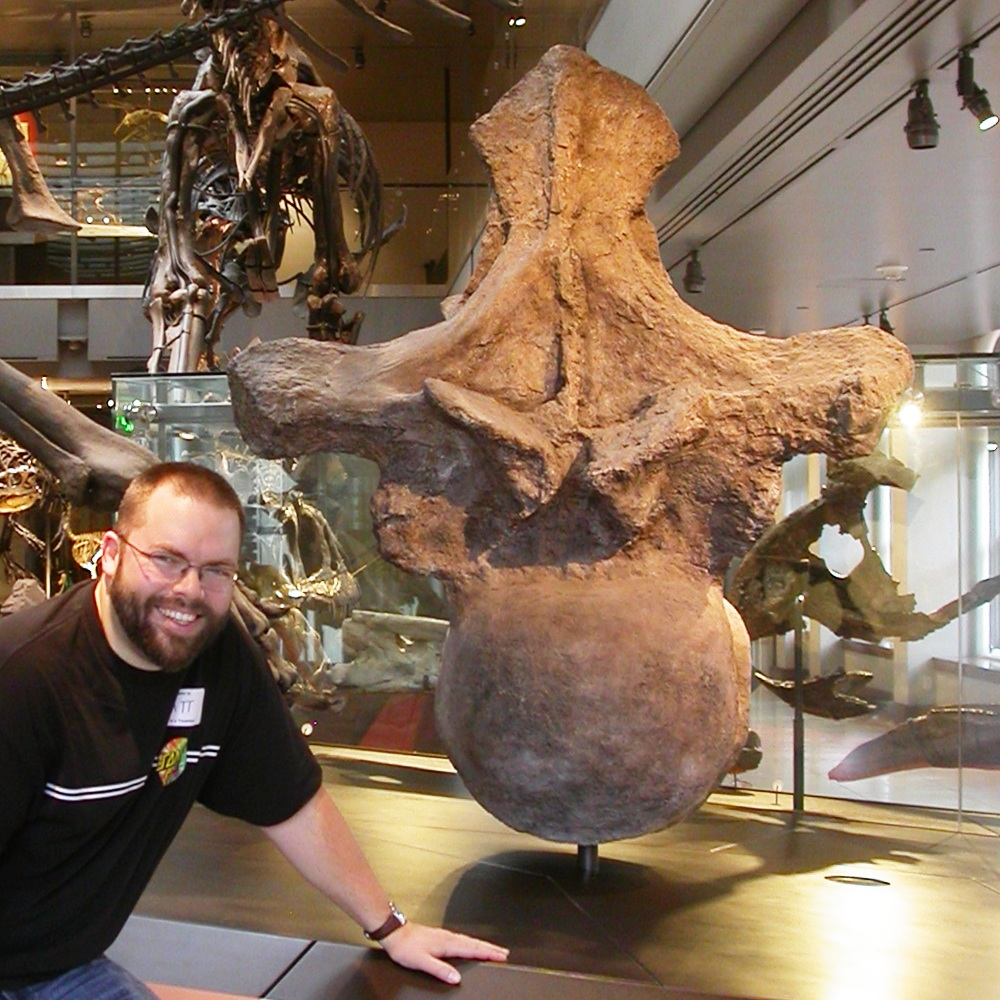
- Wedel beside the dorsal vertebra of Argentinosaurus
- Scientific career
- Fields: Paleontologist
- Workplaces: Western University of Health Sciences

Mathew John Wedel is an American paleontologist. He is associate professor at the Western University of Health Sciences Department of Anatomy in California. Wedel studies sauropods and the evolution of pneumatic bones in dinosaurs. At Western University, Wedel teaches gross anatomy. He has authored papers naming Aquilops (2014), Brontomerus (2011), and Sauroposeidon (2000). He has published research exploring how some dinosaurs achieved large sizes. In 2016, he co-authored the book The Sauropod Dinosaurs.

Along with paleontologists Darren Naish and Mike P. Taylor, he founded the paleontology blog Sauropod Vertebrae Picture of the Week.
