= Wann Langston Jr. =

American paleontologist

Wann Langston Jr. (1921 – April 7, 2013) was an American paleontologist and professor at the University of Texas at Austin.

Langston worked on a number of different reptiles and amphibians in his long career, beginning with the 1950 description (with J. Willis Stovall) of the theropod dinosaur Acrocanthosaurus. Langston was hired by the National Museum of Canada in 1954 to replace Charles M. Sternberg, and worked in western Canada and on Prince Edward Island until 1962. One of his major finds, with Loris Russell, was the rediscovery of Sternberg's Scabby Butte Pachyrhinosaurus bonebed. Langston, along with a small team of fieldworkers, excavated the Scabby Butte bonebed in 1957, securing several skulls and several hundred bones there. He then went on in 1963 to the University of Texas, where in 1969 he became the second director of the Vertebrate Paleontology Laboratory, where he worked on many projects, including work on Cretaceous vertebrates from Big Bend National Park. Finds that he and his students worked on include the giant pterosaur Quetzalcoatlus and a variety of Permian and Mesozoic reptiles. He retired in 1986, but continued to be active in the field. In 2007, Langston was the twentieth recipient of the Society of Vertebrate Paleontology's A. S. Romer-G. G. Simpson Medal, the highest honor of the society.

Langston died of natural causes a few days after a Geological Society of America symposium held in his honor at the South Central Geological Society of America meeting in Austin, Texas.

Animals named by Langston include the carcharodontosaurid theropod Acrocanthosaurus (1950), the hadrosauroid dinosaur Lophorhothon (1960), the microsaur Carrolla (1986), and the azdarchid pterosaurs Wellnhopterus and Quetzalcoatlus lawsoni (the latter two named posthumously in 2021). The mesoeucrocodylians Langstonia, Akanthosuchus langstoni, and Albertochampsa langstoni; theropod Saurornitholestes langstoni; pachycephalosaur Texacephale langstoni; and pterosaur Radiodactylus langstoni were named for him.

== Selected publications ==
- Stovall, J.W., & W. Langston Jr. 1950. Acrocanthosaurus atokensis, a new genus and species of Lower Cretaceous Theropoda from Oklahoma. American Midland Naturalist 43(4):686-728.
- Langston Jr., W. 1952. The first embolomerous amphibians from New Mexico. Journal of Geology 61(1):68-71.
- Langston Jr., W., & J.W. Durham. 1955. A sauropod dinosaur from Colombia. Journal of Paleontology 29(6):1047-1051.
- Langston Jr., W. 1959. Anchiceratops from the Oldman Formation of Alberta. National Museum of Canada Natural History Papers 3:1-11.
- Langston Jr., W. 1960. The vertebrate fauna of the Selma Formation of Alabama. Part VI. The dinosaurs. Fieldiana: Geology Memoirs 3(6):315-361.
- Langston Jr., W. 1963. Fossil vertebrates and the Late Paleozoic red beds of Prince Edward Island. National Museum of Canada, Bulletin 187, 36 p.
- Langston Jr., W. 1965. Fossil crocodilians from Colombia and the Cenozoic History of the Crocodylia in South America. University of California Publications of Geological Sciences, 52: 1-127.
- Langston Jr., W. 1967. The thick-headed ceratopsian dinosaur Pachyrhinosaurus (Reptilia: Ornithischia), from the Edmonton Formation near Drumheller, Canada. Canadian Journal of Earth Sciences 4:171-186.
- Langston Jr., W. 1974. Nonmammalian Comanchean tetrapods. Geoscience and Man 8:77-102.
- Langston Jr., W. 1975. The ceratopsian dinosaurs and associated lower vertebrates from the St. Mary River Formation (Maestrichtian) at Scabby Butte, southern Alberta. Canadian Journal of Earth Sciences 12:1576-1608.
- Langston Jr., W. 1976. A late Cretaceous vertebrate fauna from the St. Mary River Formation in western Canada. in Churcher, C.S. (ed.): Athlon. Toronto: Royal Ontario Museum, 114-133.
- Langston Jr., W. 1986. Carrolla craddocki; a new genus and species of microsaur from the Lower Permian of Texas. The Pearce-Sellards series (43)1-20.
