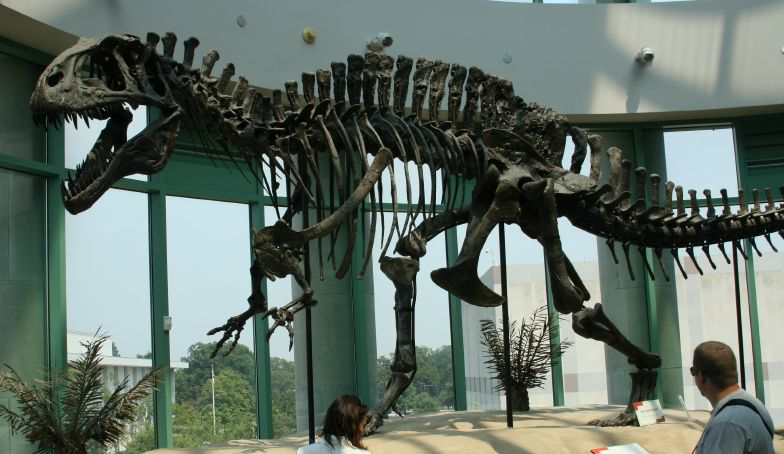
- Mounted skeleton (NCSM 14345) at the North Carolina Museum of Natural Sciences.

Scientific classification
- Kingdom: Animalia
- Phylum: Chordata
- Class: Reptilia
- Clade: Dinosauria
- Clade: Saurischia
- Clade: Theropoda
- Family: †Carcharodontosauridae
- Genus: †Acrocanthosaurus; Stovall & Langston, 1950

Type species
- †Acrocanthosaurus atokensis Stovall & Langston, 1950

Synonyms
- "Acracanthus" Langston, 1947 vide Czaplewski, Cifelli, & Langston, W.R., 1994 (nomen nudum)

= Acrocanthosaurus =

Acrocanthosaurus Temporal range: Early Cretaceous to Late Cretaceous (Barremian to Cenomanian), 125–99.6 Ma

Genus of carcharodontosaurid dinosaur from the Early Cretaceous

Acrocanthosaurus (/ˌækroʊˌkænθəˈsɔːrəs/ AK-roh-KAN-thə-SOR-əs; lit. 'high-spined lizard') is a genus of carcharodontosaurid dinosaurs that existed in what is now North America during the Barremian and early Cenomanian stages of the Early Cretaceous and Late Cretaceous, from 125 to 99.6 million years ago. Like most dinosaur genera, Acrocanthosaurus contains only a single species, A. atokensis. It had a continent-wide range, with fossil remains known from the U.S. states of Arizona, Oklahoma, Texas, Utah, and Wyoming in the west and Maryland in the east. However, most of these remains are assigned to the species based on the assumption that Acrocanthosaurus is the only large carcharodontosaurid from North America during this time, and the possibility exists that some referred specimens could represent distinct taxa.

Acrocanthosaurus was a bipedal predator. As the name suggests, it is best known for the high neural spines on many of its vertebrae, which most likely supported a ridge of muscle over the animal's neck, back, and hips. Acrocanthosaurus was one of the largest theropods, with the largest known specimen reaching 11–11.5 metres (36–38 ft) in length and 4.4 and 8.4 metric tons (4.9 and 9.3 short tons) in weight. Large theropod footprints discovered in Texas may have been made by Acrocanthosaurus, although no direct association with skeletal remains has been found. Recent discoveries have elucidated many details of its anatomy, allowing for specialized studies focusing on its brain structure and forelimb function. Acrocanthosaurus was the largest theropod in its ecosystem and likely an apex predator that preyed on sauropods, ornithopods, and ankylosaurs.

== Discovery and naming ==
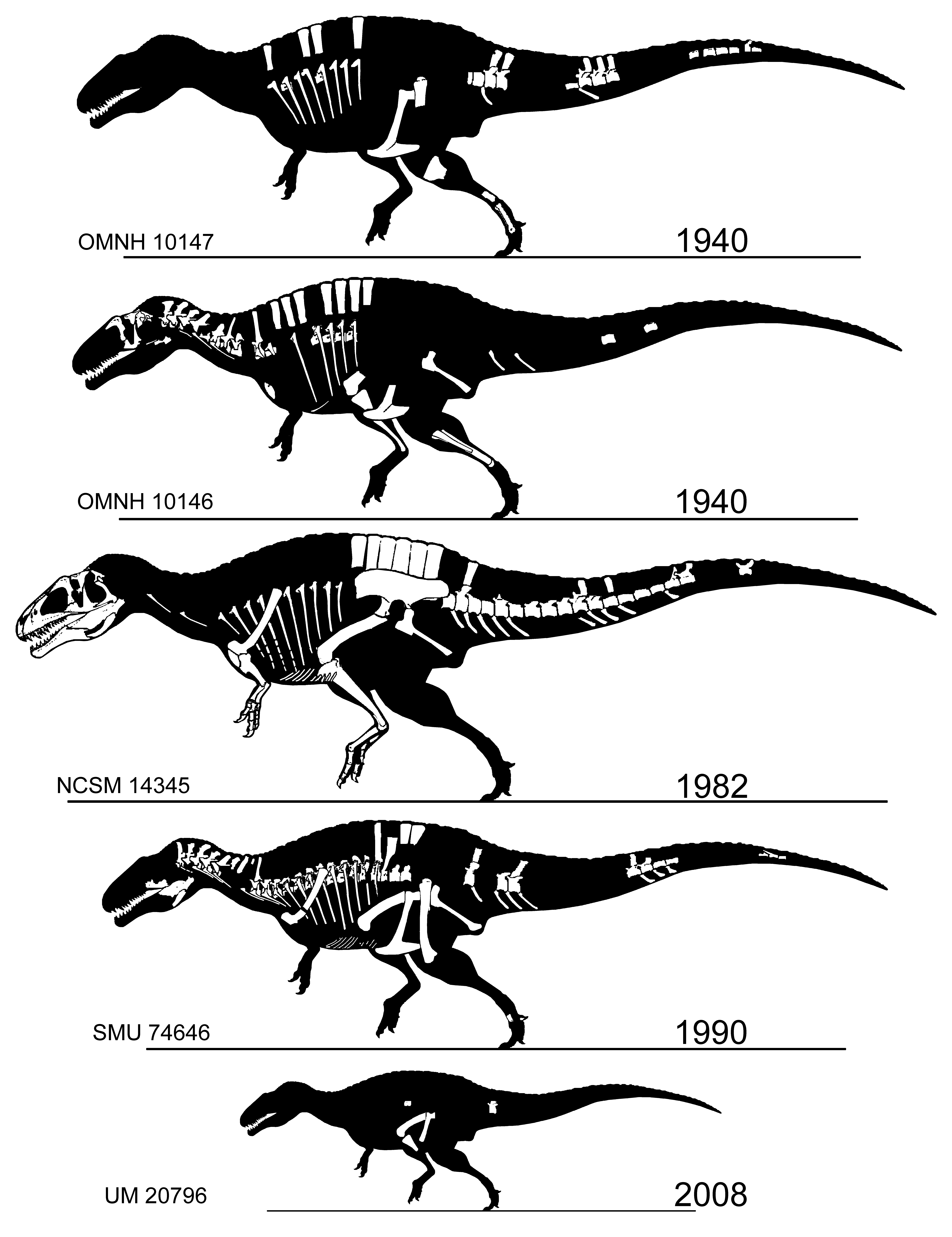
Known parts of the Acrocanthosaurus specimens (to scale) as of 2015

Acrocanthosaurus is named after its tall neural spines, from the Greek ἄκρος/ákros (high), ἄκανθος/ákanthos (thorn or spine), and σαῦρος/saũros (lizard). The lone named species (A. atokensis), is after Atoka County in Oklahoma, where the original specimens were found. The name was coined in 1950 by American paleontologists J. Willis Stovall and Wann Langston Jr. Langston had proposed the name "Acracanthus atokaensis" for the genus and species in his unpublished 1947 master's thesis, but the name was changed to Acrocanthosaurus atokensis for formal publication.

The holotype and paratype (OMNH 10146 and OMNH 10147), discovered in the early 1940s and described at the same time in 1950, consist of two partial skeletons and a piece of skull material from the Antlers Formation in Oklahoma. Two much more complete specimens were described in the 1990s. The first (SMU 74646) is a partial skeleton, missing most of the skull, recovered from the Twin Mountains Formation of Texas and currently part of the Fort Worth Museum of Science and History collection. An even more complete skeleton (NCSM 14345, nicknamed "Fran") was recovered from the Antlers Formation of Oklahoma by Cephis Hall and Sid Love, prepared by the Black Hills Institute in South Dakota, and is now housed at the North Carolina Museum of Natural Sciences in Raleigh. The specimen is the largest and includes the only known complete skull and forelimb. The skeletal elements of OMNH 10147 are almost the same size as comparable bones in NCSM 14345, indicating an animal roughly the same size, while the holotype and SMU 74646 are significantly smaller.

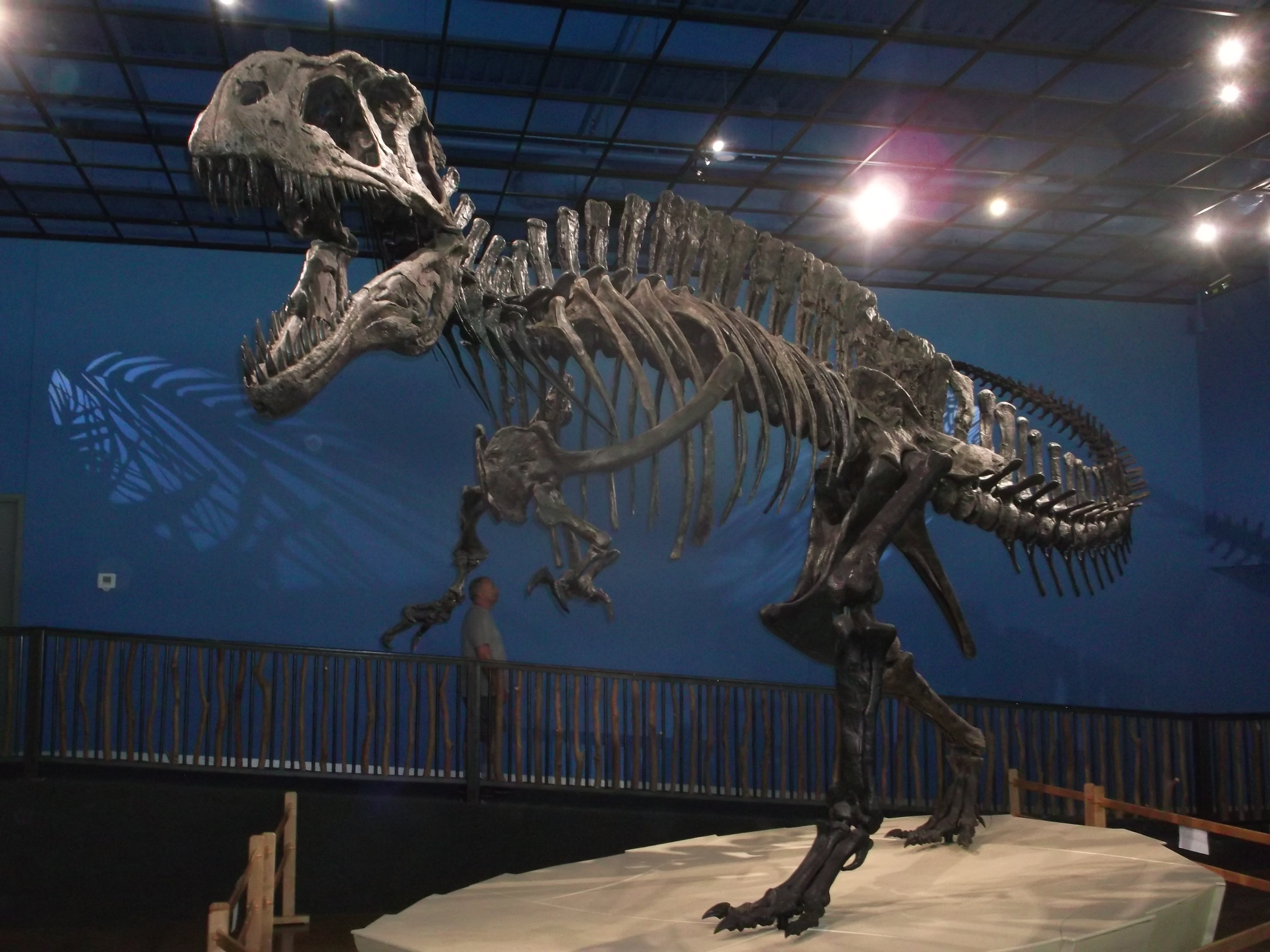
Cast of an Acrocanthosaurus atokensis skeleton (NCSM 14345) mounted at the Museum of the Red River, Idabel, Oklahoma.

The presence of Acrocanthosaurus in the Cloverly Formation was established in 2012 with the description of another partial skeleton (UM 20796). The specimen, consisting of parts of two vertebrae, partial pubic bones, a femur, a partial fibula, and fragments, represents a juvenile animal. It came from a bonebed in the Bighorn Basin of north-central Wyoming and was found near the shoulder blade of a Sauroposeidon. An assortment of other fragmentary theropod remains from the formation may also belong to Acrocanthosaurus, which may be the only large theropod in the Cloverly Formation.

Unlike many other dinosaur genera, much less large theropods, Acrocanthosaurus inhabited both the western and eastern regions of the North American continent. The presence of the genus in the Arundel Formation of Maryland (roughly concurrent with the western formations) had long been suspected, with teeth almost identical to Acrocanthosaurus previously known from the formation. In 2024, an incomplete theropod skeleton (USNM 466054) from the Arundel Formation was identified as that of a subadult Acrocanthosaurus, referred to as A. cf. atokensis, marking the first definitive record of the genus from eastern North America. This skeleton, the most completely known theropod specimen from the formation despite its fragmentary nature, had been previously identified as an ornithomimosaur until this study and also represents the smallest known individual of the genus.

Acrocanthosaurus may be known from incomplete remains outside Oklahoma, Texas, Wyoming, and Maryland. A tooth from southern Arizona has been referred to the genus, and matching tooth marks have been found in sauropod bones from the same area. Many other teeth and bones from various geologic formations throughout the western United States have also been referred to as Acrocanthosaurus, but most of these have been misidentified; there is, however, some disagreement with this assessment regarding fossils from the Cloverly Formation.

== Description ==
Size comparison of seven carcharodontosaurids (Acrocanthosaurus in light brown)

Acrocanthosaurus was among the largest theropods known to exist, with an estimated skull length of 1.23–1.29 m (4.0–4.2 ft) and body length of 11–12 m (36–39 ft), based on the largest known specimen (NCSM 14345). Researchers have yielded body mass estimates for this specimen between 4.4 and 8.4 metric tons (4.9 and 9.3 short tons) based on various techniques.

A 2017 biomechanical study of the running ability of Tyrannosaurus by the biologist William I. Sellers and colleagues suggested that skeletal loads. Using a calculated weight estimate of 7 tons, the model showed that speeds above 11 miles per hour (18 km/h) would have probably shattered the leg bones of Tyrannosaurus. The finding may mean that running was also not possible for other giant theropod dinosaurs like Giganotosaurus, Mapusaurus and Acrocanthosaurus.

=== Skull ===
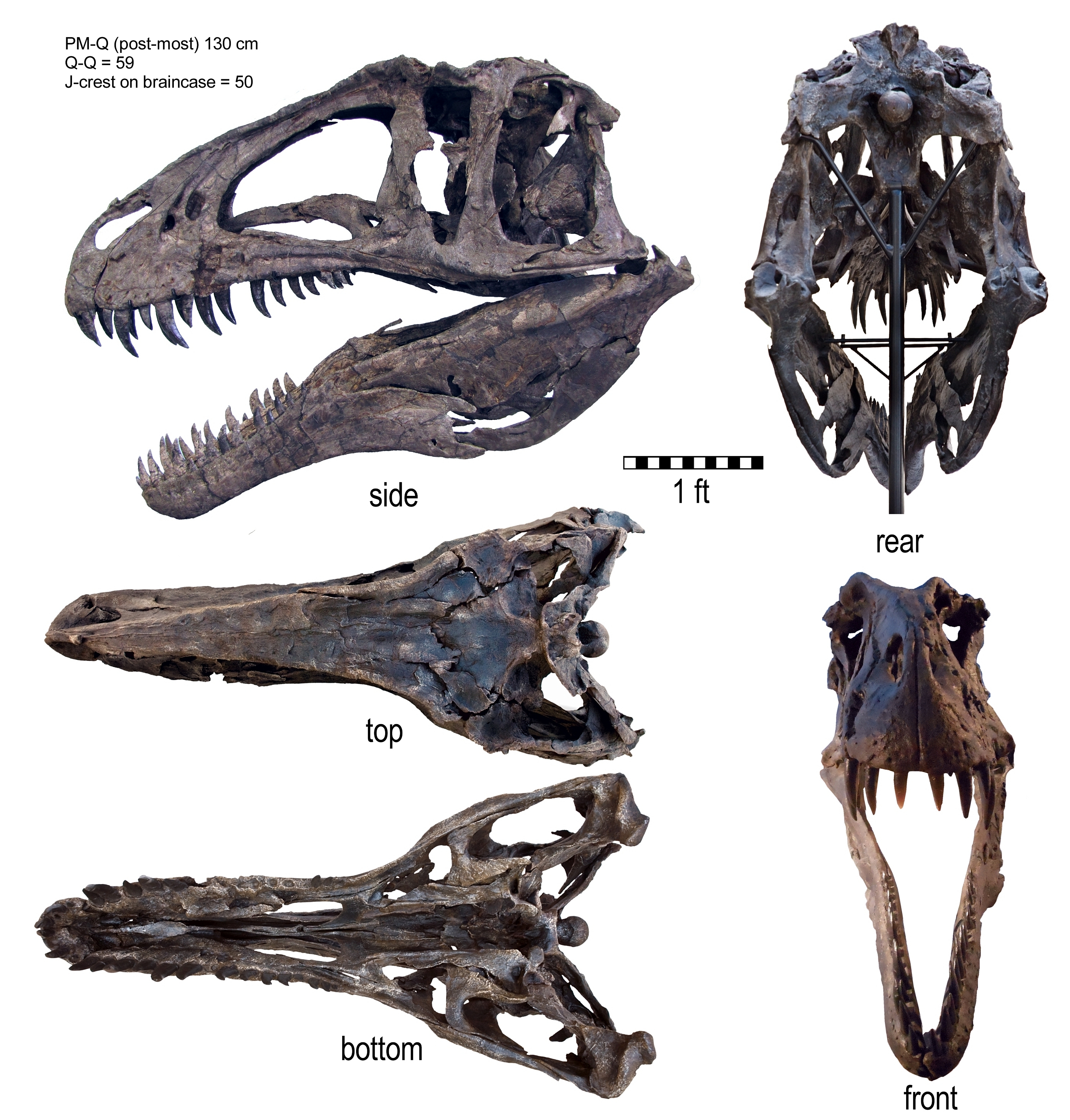
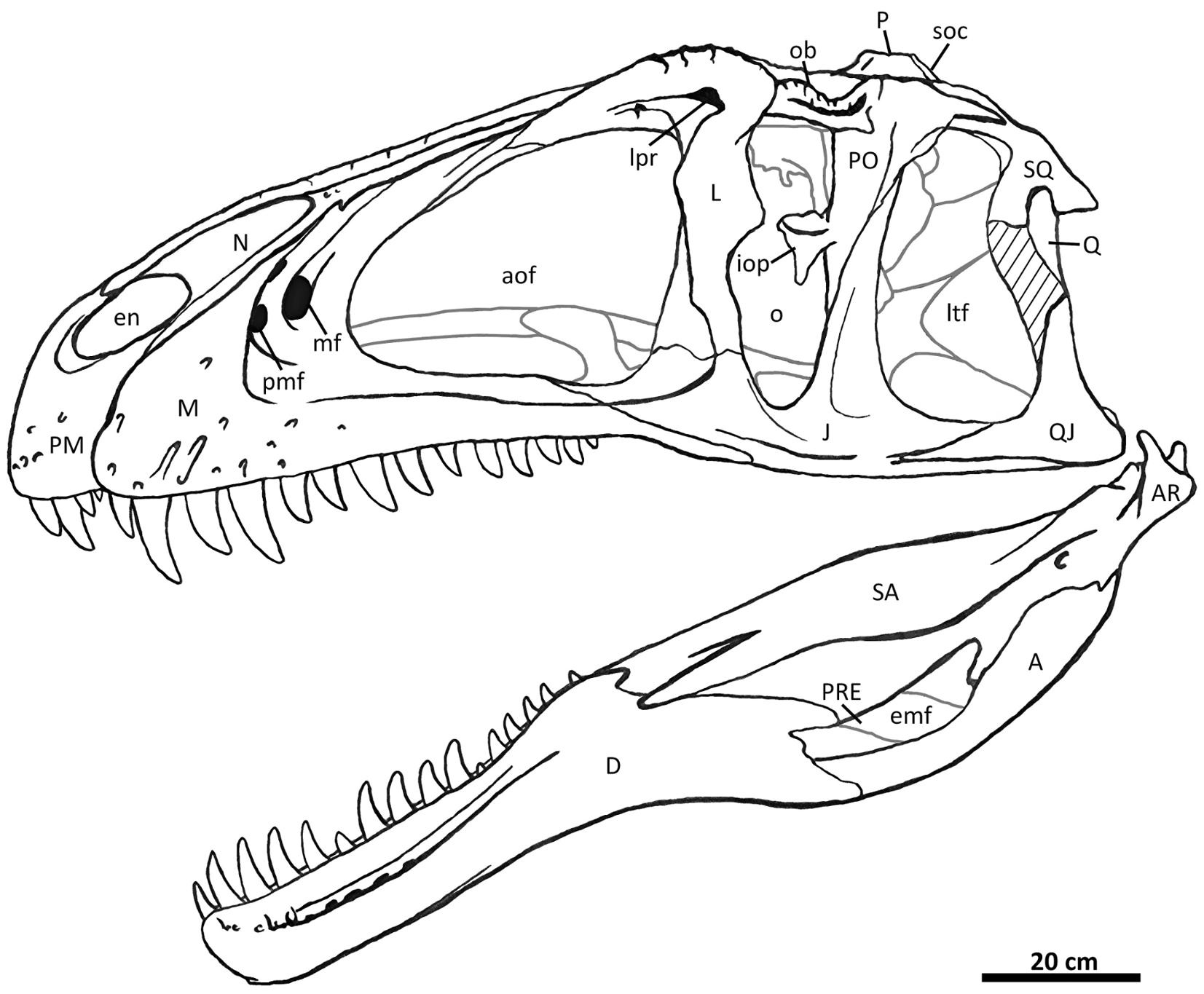
Skull of specimen NCSM 14345 in multiple views and diagram of same

The skull of Acrocanthosaurus, like most other allosauroids, was long, low, and narrow. The weight-reducing opening in front of the eye socket (antorbital fenestra) was quite large, more than a quarter of the length of the skull and two-thirds of its height. The outside surface of the maxilla (upper jaw bone) and the upper surface of the nasal bone on the roof of the snout were not nearly as rough-textured as those of Giganotosaurus nor Carcharodontosaurus. Long, low ridges arose from the nasal bones, running along each side of the snout from the nostril back to the eye, where they continued onto the lacrimal bones. This is a characteristic feature of all allosauroids. Unlike Allosaurus, no prominent crest was on the lacrimal bone in front of the eye. The lacrimal and postorbital bones met to form a thick brow over the eye, as seen in carcharodontosaurids and the unrelated abelisaurids. Nineteen curved, serrated teeth lined each side of the upper jaw, but a tooth count for the lower jaw has not been published. Acrocanthosaurus teeth were wider than those of Carcharodontosaurus and did not have the wrinkled texture that characterized the carcharodontosaurids. The dentary (tooth-bearing lower jaw bone) was squared off at the front edge, as in Giganotosaurus, and shallow, while the rest of the jaw behind it became very deep. Acrocanthosaurus and Giganotosaurus shared a thick horizontal ridge on the outside surface of the surangular bone of the lower jaw, underneath the articulation with the skull.

=== Postcranial skeleton ===
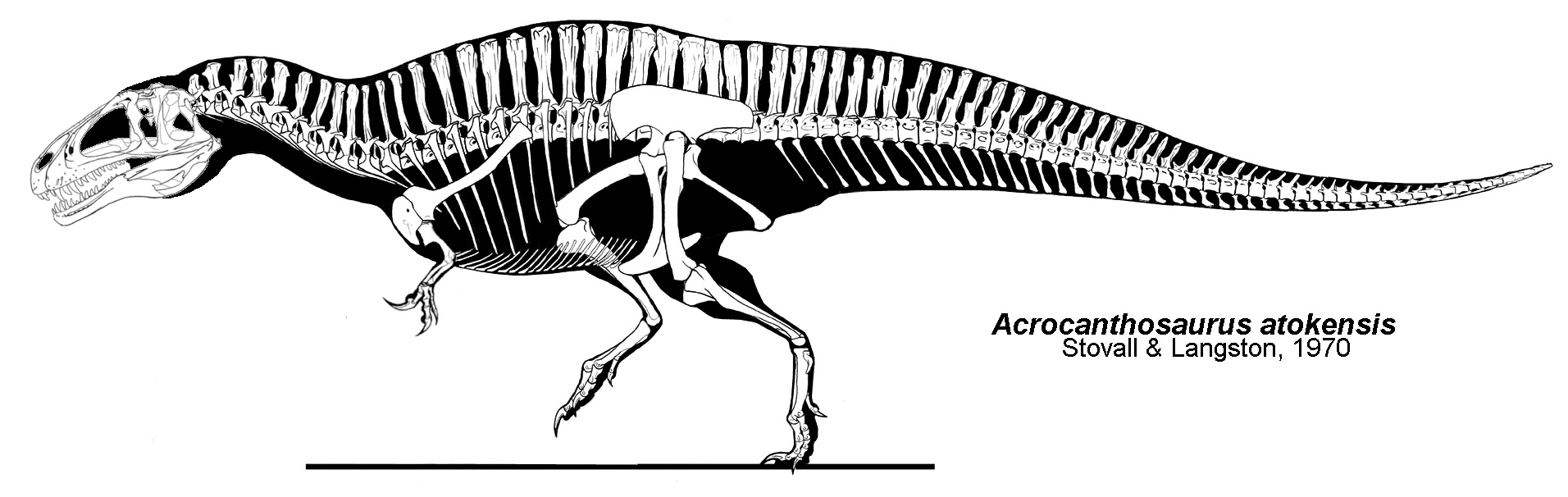
Skeletal diagram

The most notable feature of Acrocanthosaurus was its row of tall neural spines, located on the vertebrae of the neck, back, hips, and upper tail, which could be more than 2.5 times the height of the vertebrae from which they extended. Other dinosaurs also had high spines on the back, sometimes much higher than those of Acrocanthosaurus. For instance, the African genus Spinosaurus had spines nearly 2 m (6.6 ft) tall, about 11 times taller than the bodies of its vertebrae. The lower spines of Acrocanthosaurus had attachments for powerful muscles like those of modern bison, probably forming a tall, thick ridge down its back. The function of the spines remains unknown, although they may have been involved in communication, fat storage, muscle, or temperature control. All of its cervical (neck) and dorsal (back) vertebrae had prominent depressions (pleurocoels) on the sides, while the caudal (tail) vertebrae bore smaller ones. This is more similar to carcharodontosaurids than to Allosaurus.

Aside from its vertebrae, Acrocanthosaurus had a typical allosauroid skeleton. Acrocanthosaurus was bipedal, with a long, heavy tail counterbalancing the head and body, maintaining its center of gravity over its hips. Its forelimbs were relatively shorter and more robust than those of Allosaurus but were otherwise similar: each hand bore three clawed digits. Unlike many smaller fast-running dinosaurs, its femur was longer than its tibia and metatarsals, suggesting that Acrocanthosaurus was not a fast runner. Unsurprisingly, the hind leg bones of Acrocanthosaurus were proportionally more robust than its smaller relative, Allosaurus. Its feet had four digits each, although, as is typical for theropods, the first was much smaller than the rest and did not make contact with the ground.

== Classification and systematics ==
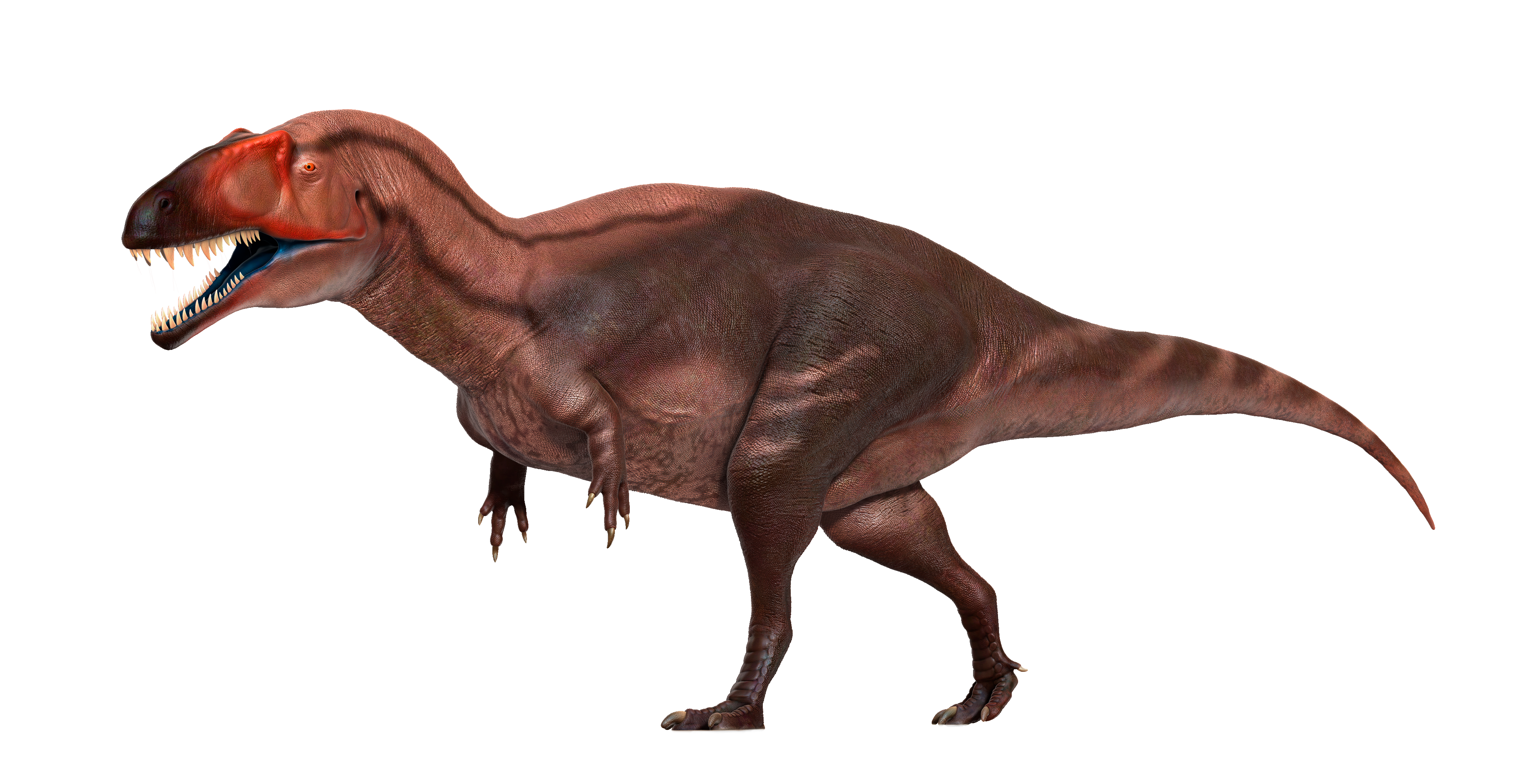
An artist's impression of Acrocanthosaurus

Acrocanthosaurus is classified in the superfamily Allosauroidea within the infraorder Tetanurae. This superfamily is characterized by paired ridges on the nasal and lacrimal bones on top of the snout and tall neural spines on the neck vertebrae, among other features. It was originally placed in the family Allosauridae with Allosaurus, an arrangement also supported by studies as late as 2000. Most studies have found it to be a member of the related family Carcharodontosauridae.

At the time of its discovery, Acrocanthosaurus and most other large theropods were known from only fragmentary remains, leading to highly variable classifications for this genus. J. Willis Stovall and Wann Langston Jr. first assigned it to the "Antrodemidae", the equivalent of the Allosauridae, but it was transferred to the Megalosauridae, a wastebasket taxon, by Alfred Sherwood Romer in 1956. To other authors, the long spines on its vertebrae suggested a relationship with Spinosaurus. This interpretation of Acrocanthosaurus as a spinosaurid persisted into the 1980s, and was repeated in the semi-technical dinosaur books of the time.

Tall spined vertebrae from the Early Cretaceous of England were once considered to be very similar to those of Acrocanthosaurus, and in 1988 Gregory S. Paul named them as a second species of the genus, A. altispinax. These bones were originally assigned to Altispinax, an English theropod otherwise known only from teeth, and this assignment led to at least one author proposing that Altispinax itself was a synonym of Acrocanthosaurus. These vertebrae were later assigned to the new genus Becklespinax, separate from both Acrocanthosaurus and Altispinax.

Most cladistic analyses including Acrocanthosaurus have found it to be a carcharodontosaurid, usually in a basal position relative to Carcharodontosaurus of Africa and Giganotosaurus from South America. It has often been considered the sister taxon to the equally basal Eocarcharia, also from Africa. Neovenator, discovered in England, is often considered an even more basal carcharodontosaurid, or as a basal member of a sister group called Neovenatoridae. This suggests that the family originated in Europe and then dispersed into the southern continents (at the time united as the supercontinent Gondwana). If Acrocanthosaurus was a carcharodontosaurid, then dispersal would also have occurred into North America. All known carcharodontosaurids lived during the early-to-middle Cretaceous period. The following cladogram after Novas et al., 2013, shows the placement of Acrocanthosaurus within Carcharodontosauridae.

- - Allosaurus
  - Carcharodontosauridae
    - Neovenator
    - Eocarcharia
    - Concavenator
    - - Acrocanthosaurus
      - - Shaochilong
        - Carcharodontosaurinae
          - Carcharodontosaurus
          - Giganotosaurini
            - Tyrannotitan
            - - Mapusaurus
              - Giganotosaurus

Cau (2024) recovered similar results for Acrocanthosaurus. His results are shown below.

- Carcharodontosauridae
  - Neovenator
  - - - Sauroniops
      - Veterupristisaurus
      - Lusovenator
      - Eocarcharia (type skull roof)
      - Concavenator
    - - Carcharodontosaurus iguidensis (holotype maxilla)
      - - Acrocanthosaurus
        - - Eocarcharia (referred maxilla)
          - - - - Meraxes
                - Carcharodontosaurus iguidensis (referred cranial material)
              - - Lajasvenator
                - - Labocania
                  - Shaochilong
            - - - Carcharodontosaurus saharicus (neotype)
                - Carcharodontosaurus saharicus (described by Stromer in 1931)
              - - Tyrannotitan
                - - Mapusaurus
                  - Giganotosaurus

In the description of the carcharodontosaurid Tameryraptor, it is noted the specimen NCSM 14345 possesses several differences from the type specimen of Acrocanthosaurus atokensis, seen listed below:

- The antorbital fossa is separated dorsally and ventrally by an anterior expansion of the lateral lamina.
- A narrow orbital margin with an antorbital fossa that is restricted to the antorbital part of the jugal.
- A wide, dorsally bifurcated supraoccipital crest.
- A wide angle between the occiput in the braincase and the posterior skull roof.
- The absence of a ridge extending from the dorsal rim of the paroccipital process medially below the posterior exit of the mid-cerebral vein.
- A completely split trigeminal foramen.
- Wider pneumatic pockets next to the occipital condyle.
- Ventral indentation of the articular surface of the occipital condyle.
- The distal shaft of the tibia is straight.

While beyond the scope of their paper, the authors note that these differences may be grounds for a reexamination of North American carcharodontosaurid material, and may suggest a much richer diversity than once thought.

== Paleobiology ==
=== Growth and longevity ===
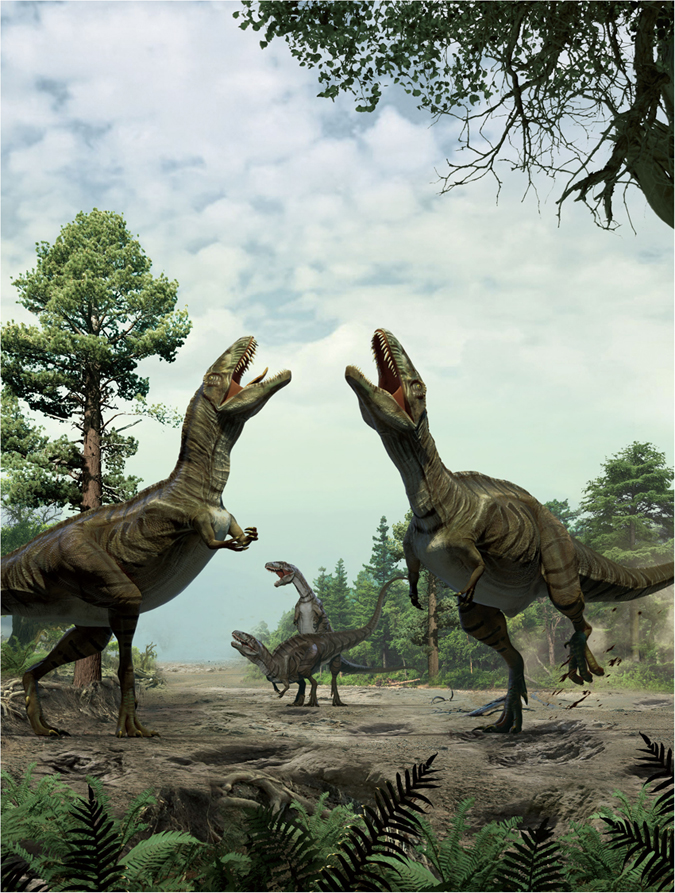
Restoration of a pair of Acrocanthosaurus engaging in courtship behavior

From the bone features of the holotype OMNH 10146 and NCSM 14345, it is estimated that Acrocanthosaurus required at least 12 years to fully grow. This number may have been much higher because in the process of bones remodeling and the growth of the medullary cavity, some Harris lines were lost. If accounting for these lines, then Acrocanthosaurus needed 18–24 years to be mature.

=== Bite force ===
The bite force of Acrocanthosaurus was studied and compared with that of 33 other dinosaurs by Sakamoto et al. (2022). According to the results, its bite force at the anterior part of the jaws was 8,266 newtons, while the posterior bite force was estimated to be 16,894 newtons.

=== Forelimb function ===
Like those of most other non-avian theropods, Acrocanthosaurus forelimbs did not make contact with the ground and were not used for locomotion; instead, they served a predatory function. The discovery of a complete forelimb (NCSM 14345) allowed the first analysis of the function and range of motion of the forelimb in Acrocanthosaurus. The study examined the bone surfaces which would have articulated with other bones to determine how far the joints could move without dislocating. In many of the joints, the bones did not fit together exactly, indicating the presence of a considerable amount of cartilage in the joints, as is seen in many living archosaurs. Among other findings, the study suggested that, in a resting position, the forelimbs would have hung from the shoulders with the humerus angled backward slightly, the elbow bent, and the claws facing medially (inwards). The shoulder of Acrocanthosaurus was limited in its range of motion compared to that of humans. The arm could not swing in a complete circle, but could retract (swing backward) 109° from the vertical, so that the humerus could actually be angled slightly upwards. Protraction (swinging forward) was limited to only 24° past the vertical. The arm was unable to reach a vertical position when adducting (swinging downwards) but could abduct (swing upwards) to 9° above horizontal. Movement at the elbow was also limited compared to humans, with a total range of motion of only 57°. The arm could not completely extend (straighten), nor could it flex (bend) very far, with the humerus unable even to form a right angle with the forearm. The radius and ulna (forearm bones) locked together so that there was no possibility of pronation or supination (twisting) as in human forearms.

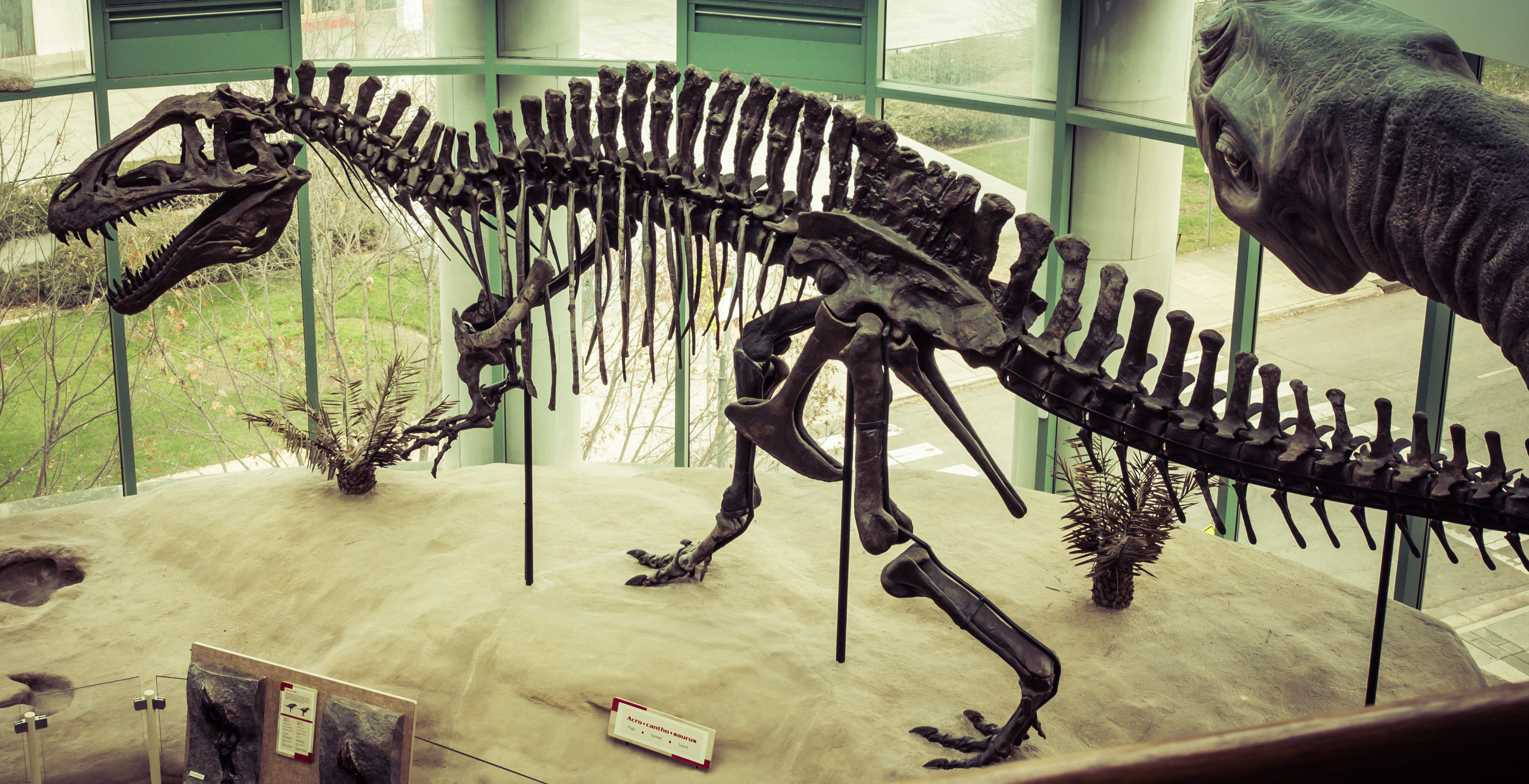
Mounted skeleton seen from above

None of the carpals (wrist bones) fit together precisely, suggesting the presence of a large amount of cartilage in the wrist, which would have stiffened it. All of the digits were able to hyperextend (bend backward) until they nearly touched the wrist. When flexed, the middle digit would converge towards the first digit, while the third digit would twist inwards. The first digit of the hand bore the largest claw, which was permanently flexed so that it curved back towards the underside of the hand. Likewise, the middle claw may have been permanently flexed, while the third claw, also the smallest, was able to both flex and extend. After determining the ranges of motion in the joints of the forelimb, the study went on to hypothesize about the predatory habits of Acrocanthosaurus. The forelimbs could not swing forward very far, unable even to scratch the animal's own neck. Therefore, they were not likely to have been used in the initial capture of prey and Acrocanthosaurus probably led with its mouth when hunting. On the other hand, the forelimbs were able to retract towards the body very strongly. Once prey had been seized in the jaws, the heavily muscled forelimbs may have retracted, holding the prey tightly against the body and preventing escape. As the prey animal attempted to pull away, it would only have been further impaled on the permanently flexed claws of the first two digits. The extreme hyperextensibility of the digits may have been an adaptation allowing Acrocanthosaurus to hold struggling prey without fear of dislocation. Once the prey was trapped against the body, Acrocanthosaurus may have dispatched it with its jaws. Another possibility is that Acrocanthosaurus held its prey in its jaws, while repeatedly retracting its forelimbs, tearing large gashes with its claws. Other less probable theories have suggested the forelimb range of motion being able to grasp onto the side of a sauropod and clinging on to topple the sauropods of smaller stature, though this is unlikely due to Acrocanthosaurus having a rather robust leg structure compared to other similarly structured theropods.

=== Brain and inner ear structure ===
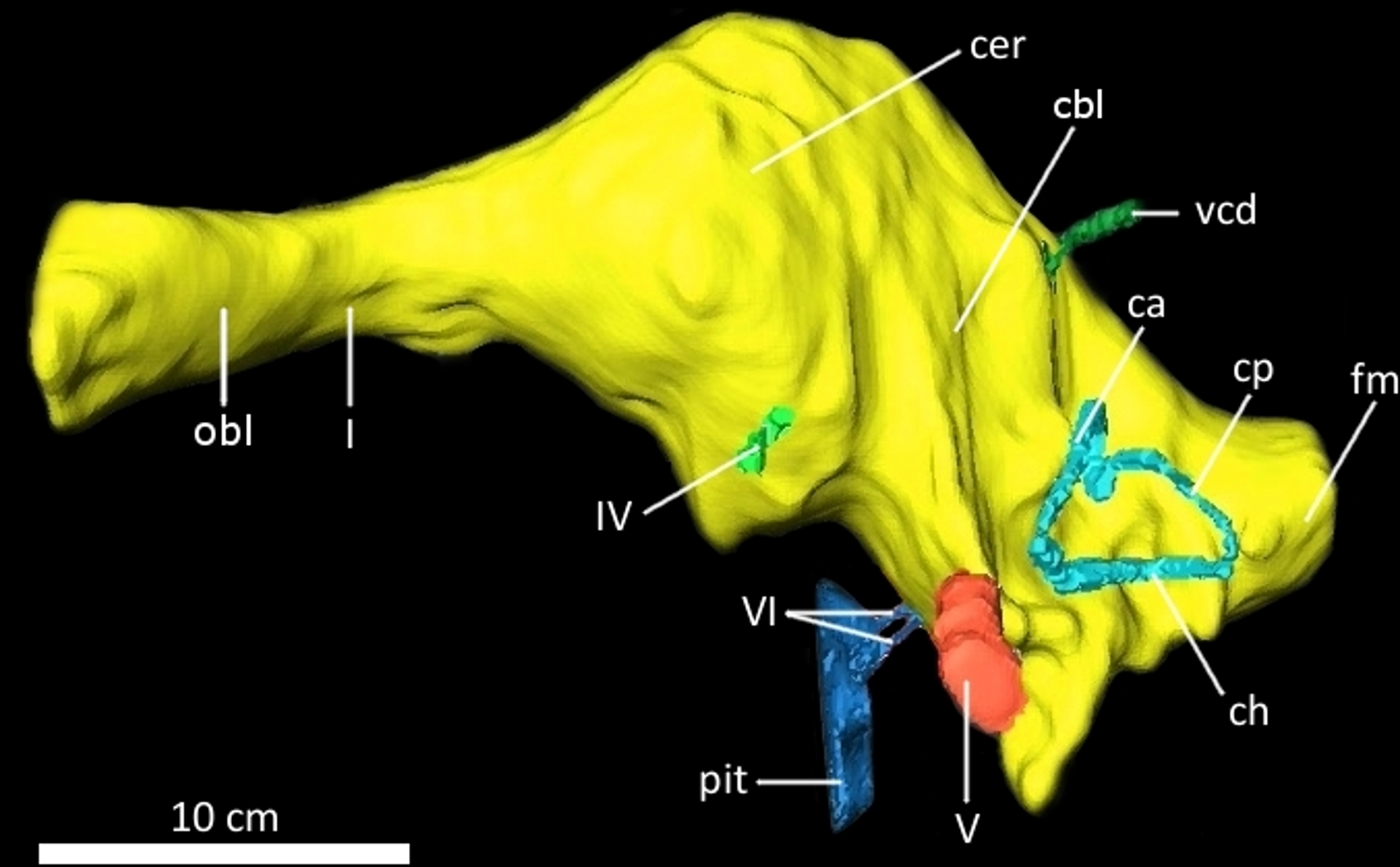
Digital endocranial endocast of the braincase of specimen NCSM 14345

In 2005, scientists reconstructed an endocast (replica) of an Acrocanthosaurus cranial cavity using computed tomography (CT scanning) to analyze the spaces within the holotype braincase (OMNH 10146). In life, much of this space would have been filled with the meninges and cerebrospinal fluid, in addition to the brain itself. However, the general features of the brain and cranial nerves could be determined from the endocast and compared to other theropods for which endocasts have been created. While the brain is similar to many theropods, it is most similar to that of allosauroids. It most resembles the brains of Carcharodontosaurus and Giganotosaurus rather than those of Allosaurus or Sinraptor, providing support for the hypothesis that Acrocanthosaurus was a carcharodontosaurid.

The brain was slightly sigmoidal (S-shaped), without much expansion of the cerebral hemispheres, more like a crocodile than a bird. This is in keeping with the overall conservatism of non-coelurosaurian theropod brains. Acrocanthosaurus had large and bulbous olfactory bulbs, indicating a good sense of smell. Reconstructing the semicircular canals of the ear, which control balance, shows that the head was held at a 25° angle below horizontal. This was determined by orienting the endocast so that the lateral semicircular canal was parallel to the ground, as it usually is when an animal is in an alert posture.

=== Possible footprints ===
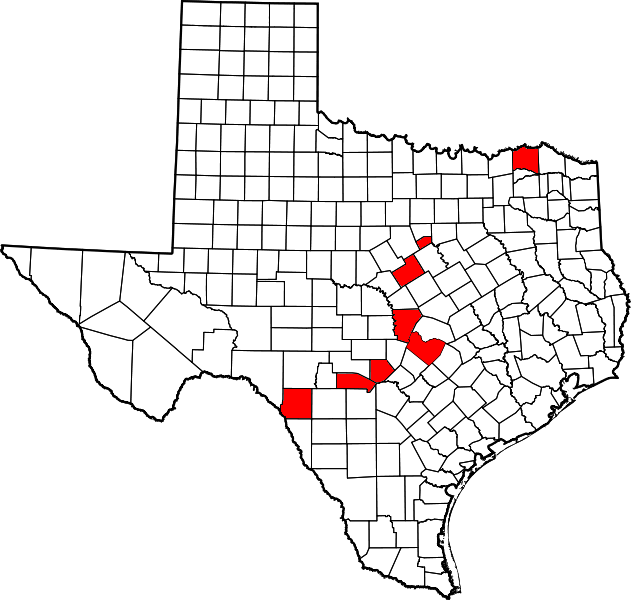
Some Texas counties where large theropod tracks have been discovered in the Glen Rose Formation

The Glen Rose Formation of central Texas preserves many dinosaur footprints, including large, three-toed theropod prints. The most famous of these trackways was discovered along the Paluxy River in Dinosaur Valley State Park, a section of which is now on exhibit in the American Museum of Natural History in New York City, although several other sites around the state have been described in the literature. It is impossible to say what animal made the prints, since no fossil bones have been associated with the trackways. However, scientists have long considered it likely that the footprints belong to Acrocanthosaurus. A 2001 study compared the Glen Rose footprints to the feet of various large theropods but could not confidently assign them to any particular genus. However, the study noted that the tracks were within the ranges of size and shape expected for Acrocanthosaurus. Because the Glen Rose Formation is close to the Antlers and Twin Mountains Formations in both geographical location and geological age, and the only large theropod known from those formations is Acrocanthosaurus, the study concluded that Acrocanthosaurus was most likely to have made the tracks.

Digital fly-through over the Glen Rose trackway, reconstructed from photographs

The famous Glen Rose trackway on display in New York City includes theropod footprints belonging to several individuals which moved in the same direction as up to twelve sauropod dinosaurs. The theropod prints are sometimes found on top of the sauropod footprints, indicating that they were formed later. This has been put forth as evidence that a small pack of Acrocanthosaurus was stalking a herd of sauropods. While interesting and plausible, this hypothesis is difficult to prove and other explanations exist. For example, several solitary theropods may have moved through in the same direction at different times after the sauropods had passed, creating the appearance of a pack stalking its prey. The same can be said for the purported "herd" of sauropods, who also may or may not have been moving as a group. At a point where it crosses the path of one of the sauropods, one of the theropod trackways is missing a footprint, which has been cited as evidence of an attack. However, other scientists doubt the validity of this interpretation because the sauropod did not change gait, as would be expected if a large predator were hanging onto its side.

=== Pathology ===
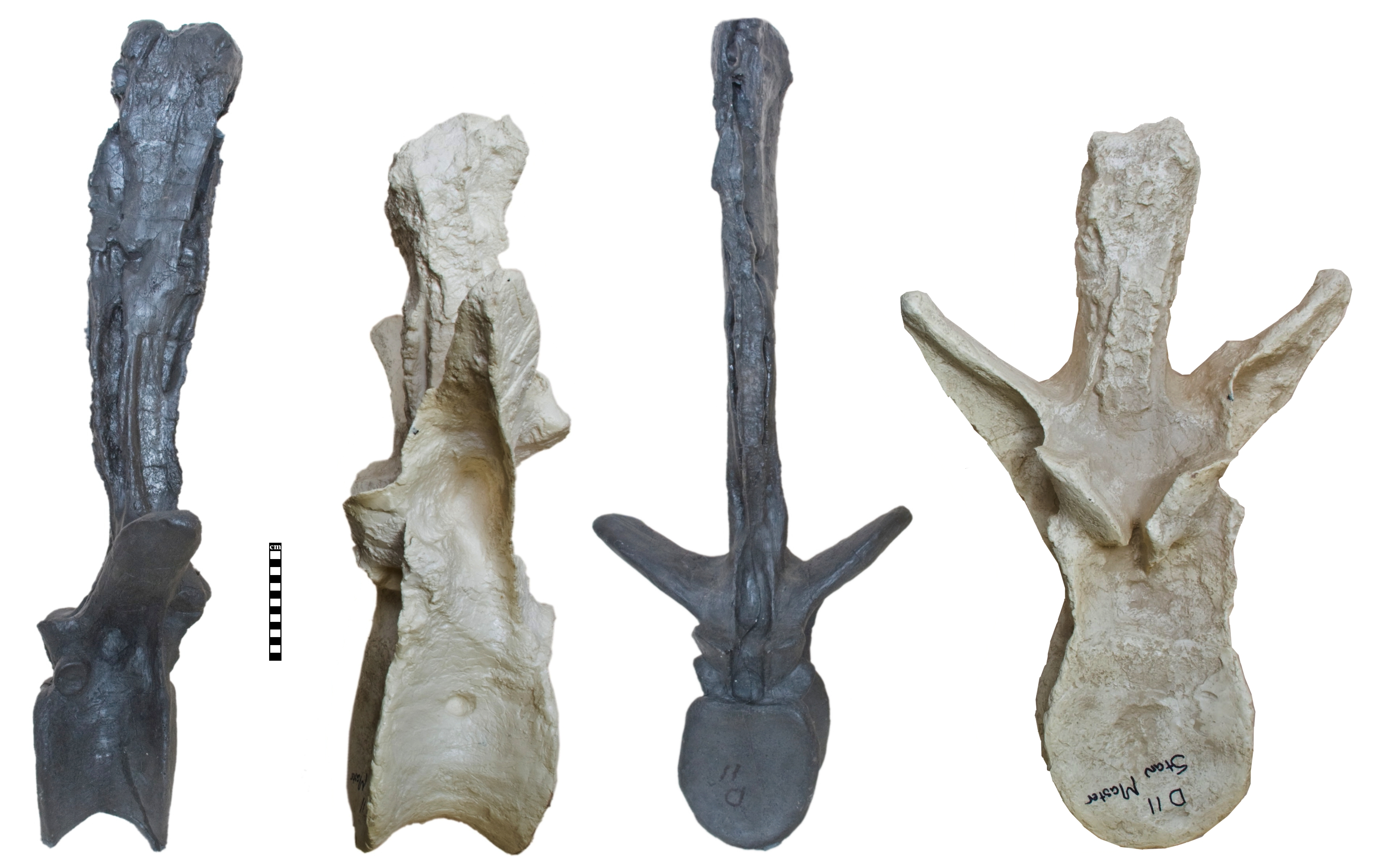
Comparison of the 11th dorsal vertebra in Acrocanthosaurus (specimen Fran) and Tyrannosaurus (specimen Stan)

The skull of the Acrocanthosaurus atokensis holotype shows light exostotic material on the squamosal. The neural spine of the eleventh vertebra was fractured and healed while the neural spine of its third tail vertebra had an unusual hook-like structure.

== Paleoecology ==
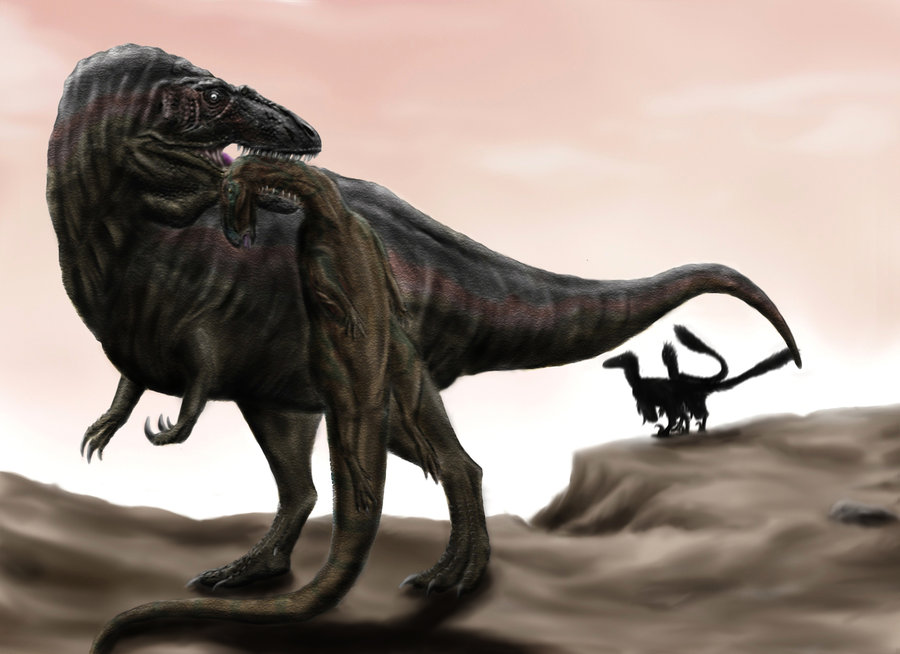
Acrocanthosaurus carrying a Tenontosaurus carcass away from a pair of Deinonychus

Definite Acrocanthosaurus fossils have been found in the Twin Mountains Formation of northern Texas, the Antlers Formation of southern Oklahoma, the Cloverly Formation of north-central Wyoming, the Turney Ranch Formation of Arizona, Cedar Mountain Formation of Utah and the Arundel Formation in Maryland. These geological formations have not been dated radiometrically, but scientists have used biostratigraphy to estimate their age. Based on changes in ammonite taxa, the boundary between the Aptian and Albian stages of the Early Cretaceous has been located within the Glen Rose Formation of Texas, which may contain Acrocanthosaurus footprints and lies just above the Twin Mountains Formation. This indicates that the Twin Mountains Formation lies entirely within the Aptian stage, which lasted from 125 to 112 million years ago. The Antlers Formation contains fossils of Deinonychus and Tenontosaurus, two dinosaur genera also found in the Cloverly Formation, which has been radiometrically dated to the Aptian and Albian stages, suggesting a similar age for the Antlers. Therefore, Acrocanthosaurus most likely existed between 125 and 99.6 million years ago.

During this time, the area preserved in the Twin Mountains and Antlers formations was a large floodplain that drained into a shallow inland sea. A few million years later, this sea would expand to the north, becoming the Western Interior Seaway and dividing North America in two for nearly the entire Late Cretaceous. The presence of Acrocanthosaurus in the Arundel Formation suggests that it had managed to spread across the continent before the seaway could impede it. The Glen Rose Formation represents a coastal environment, with possible Acrocanthosaurus tracks preserved in mudflats along the ancient shoreline. As Acrocanthosaurus was a large predator, it is expected that it had an extensive home range and lived in many different environments in the area. Potential prey animals include sauropods like Astrodon or possibly even the enormous Sauroposeidon, as well as large ornithopods like Tenontosaurus. The smaller theropod Deinonychus also prowled the area but at 3 metres (10 ft) in length, most likely provided only minimal competition for adult Acrocanthosaurus, and may have been preyed upon.
