= J. Willis Stovall =

American paleontologist

John Willis Stovall (1891– July 24, 1953) was an American paleontologist at the University of Oklahoma. Along with his student Wann Langston, Jr., he named the theropod dinosaur Acrocanthosaurus in 1950. Most of his research centered on the Cimarron Valley region of extreme northwestern Oklahoma, which included his work regarding the Keyes meteorite.

The Sam Noble Museum of Oklahoma Natural History was previously named "The Stovall Museum" in his honor.

== Selected publication ==
- Stovall, J.W., & W. Langston, Jr. 1950. Acrocanthosaurus atokensis, a new genus and species of Lower Cretaceous Theropoda from Oklahoma. American Midland Naturalist 43(4): 686–728.
