= Antlers Formation =

Geologic formation in the United States

- Stratigraphic range: Aptian; ~120–112 Ma
- Type: Geological formation

Lithology
- Primary: Mudstone
- Other: Sandstone

Location
- Region: Oklahoma, Texas
- Country: United States

Type section
- Named by: Robert Thomas Hill

The Antlers Formation is a stratum which ranges from Arkansas through southern Oklahoma into northeastern Texas. The stratum is 150 m (490 ft) thick consisting of silty to sandy mudstone and fine to coarse grained sandstone that is poorly to moderately sorted. The stratum is cemented with clay and calcium carbonate. In places the sandstone may be conglomeratic or ferruginous (rich in iron oxides).

Based on correlation with the Trinity Group of Texas, the Antlers Formation is estimated to be late Aptian-early Albian. This age range is supported by the presence of two dinosaurs that are also known from the Cloverly Formation, Deinonychus and Tenontosaurus.

== Amphibians ==
Indeterminate frog remains. Possible indeterminate salamander remains.

Amphibians of the Antlers Formation
Genus	Species	Location	Stratigraphic position	Abundance	Notes	Images
Albanerpeton	Albanerpeton arthridion					Albanerpeton

== Fish ==
References: Cifelli et al. 1999; Wedel et al. 2000, Kielan-Jarorowska and Cifelli 2001; Nydam and Cifelli 2002.

=== Cartilaginous fish ===
Chondrichthyans of the Antlers Formation
Genus	Species	Location	Stratigraphic position	Abundance	Notes	Images
Hybodus	Hybodus butleri				Hybodontidae	Hybodus
Hybodus	?Hybodus sp.					Hybodus
Lissodus	Lissodus anitae				Polyacrodontidae	Hybodus

=== Ray-finned fish ===
Possible indeterminate amid remains. Possible indeterminate lepisosteid remains. Possible indeterminate semionotidae remains.

Actinopterygians of the Antlers Formation
Genus	Species	Location	Stratigraphic position	Abundance	Notes
Gyronchus	Gyronchus dumblei				
?Palaeobalistum	?Palaeobalistum sp.				

== Mammals ==
Possible indeterminate deltatheroidan material. Indeterminate multituberculate remains. Indeterminate tribosphenidan remains.

Mammals of the Antlers Formation
Genus	Species	Location	Stratigraphic position	Abundance	Notes
Astroconodon	Astroconodon sp.				
Atokatheridium	Atokatheridium boreni				
?Paracimexomys	Paracimexomys crossi				

== Reptiles ==
=== Crurotarsans ===
Possible indeterminate atoposaurid remains. Possible indeterminate goniopholidid remains. Possible indeterminate pholidosaurid remains.

Crurotarsans of the Antlers Formation
Genus	Species	Location	Stratigraphic position	Abundance	Notes	Images
Bernissartia	Bemissartia sp.					Bernissartia

=== Lepidosaurs ===
Possible indeterminate scincid remains.

Lepidosaurs of the Antlers Formation
Genus	Species	Location	Stratigraphic position	Abundance	Notes
Atokasaurus	Atokasaurus metarsiodon				
Ptilotodon	Ptilotodon wilsoni				

=== Ornithischians ===
Ornithischians of the Antlers Formation
Genus	Species	Location	Stratigraphic position	Abundance	Notes	Images
Tenontosaurus	Tenontosaurus sp.					Tenontosaurus

=== Saurischians ===
Possible indeterminate bird remains are known from the formation.

Saurischians of the Antlers Formation
Genus	Species	Location	Stratigraphic position	Material	Notes	Images
Acrocanthosaurus	Acrocanthosaurus atokensis					Acrocanthosaurus Astrodon Deinonychus Sauroposeidon
Astrodon	Astrodon sp.					Acrocanthosaurus Astrodon Deinonychus Sauroposeidon
Deinonychus	Deinonychus antirrhopus					Acrocanthosaurus Astrodon Deinonychus Sauroposeidon
Sauroposeidon	Sauroposeidon proteles			"[Four] cervical vertebrae."		Acrocanthosaurus Astrodon Deinonychus Sauroposeidon

=== Turtles ===
Turtles of the Antlers Formation
Genus	Species	Location	Stratigraphic position	Abundance	Notes	Images
?Glyptops	Glyptops sp.					
Naomichelys	Naomichelys sp.					Naomichelys

== See also ==
- List of dinosaur-bearing rock formations
