= Atokasaurus =

Atokasaurus Temporal range: Early Cretaceous

Scientific classification
- Domain: Eukaryota
- Kingdom: Animalia
- Phylum: Chordata
- Class: Reptilia
- Order: Squamata
- Infraorder: Scincomorpha
- Family: †Paramacellodidae (?)
- Genus: †Atokasaurus; Nydam and Cifelli, 2002

Type species
- †Atokasaurus metarsiodon Nydam and Cifelli, 2002

Extinct genus of lizards

Atokasaurus is an extinct genus of scincomorph lizard from the Early Cretaceous of Oklahoma. The type and only species is Atokasaurus metarsiodon, named in 2002 on the basis of a single isolated lower jaw bone found within the Antlers Formation in Atoka County. It is similar in appearance to extinct lizards in the family Paramacellodidae and may itself be a paramacellodid, although the phylogenetic relationships of the group are uncertain. Atokasaurus differs from other paramacellodids in having teeth in the lower jaw with enlarged bases and an S-shaped profile when viewed edge-on.
