= Ptilotodon =

Ptilotodon Temporal range: Early Cretaceous

Scientific classification
- Domain: Eukaryota
- Kingdom: Animalia
- Phylum: Chordata
- Class: Reptilia
- Order: Squamata
- Family: Teiidae
- Genus: †Ptilotodon; Nydam and Cifelli, 2002

Type species
- †Ptilotodon wilsoni Nydam and Cifelli, 2002

Extinct genus of lizards

Ptilotodon is an extinct genus of teiid lizard from the Early Cretaceous of Oklahoma. The type and only known species is Ptilotodon wilsoni, named in 2002 on the basis of a single lower jaw with four teeth found in the Antlers Formation. The small size of the specimen may be an indication that it belonged to a juvenile.
