= Gyronchus =

Gyronchus Temporal range: Middle Jurassic (Bathonian)

Scientific classification
- Kingdom: Animalia
- Phylum: Chordata
- Class: Actinopterygii
- Order: †Pycnodontiformes
- Genus: †Gyronchus; Agassiz, 1844

Type species
- Gyronchus oblongus Agassiz, 1844

Extinct genus of fishes

Gyronchus is an extinct genus of prehistoric marine pycnodont fish from the Jurassic. This genus is currently treated as a wastebasket taxon, with several genera such as Macromesodon and Turbomesodon being split out of it. The type species, G. oblongus Agassiz, 1844 is known from the Bathonian-aged Stonesfield Slate of England. Another apparent freshwater species, G. dumblei is known from the Early Cretaceous-aged Paluxy Formation of Texas, US and the Antlers Formation of Oklahoma, but is more likely a member of Turbomesodon.

== See also ==
- Prehistoric fish
- List of prehistoric bony fish
