= Raymond Persinger =

American artist (born 1959)

Raymond Persinger (born 1959) is an American artist best known for his large bronze sculptures and public art installations.

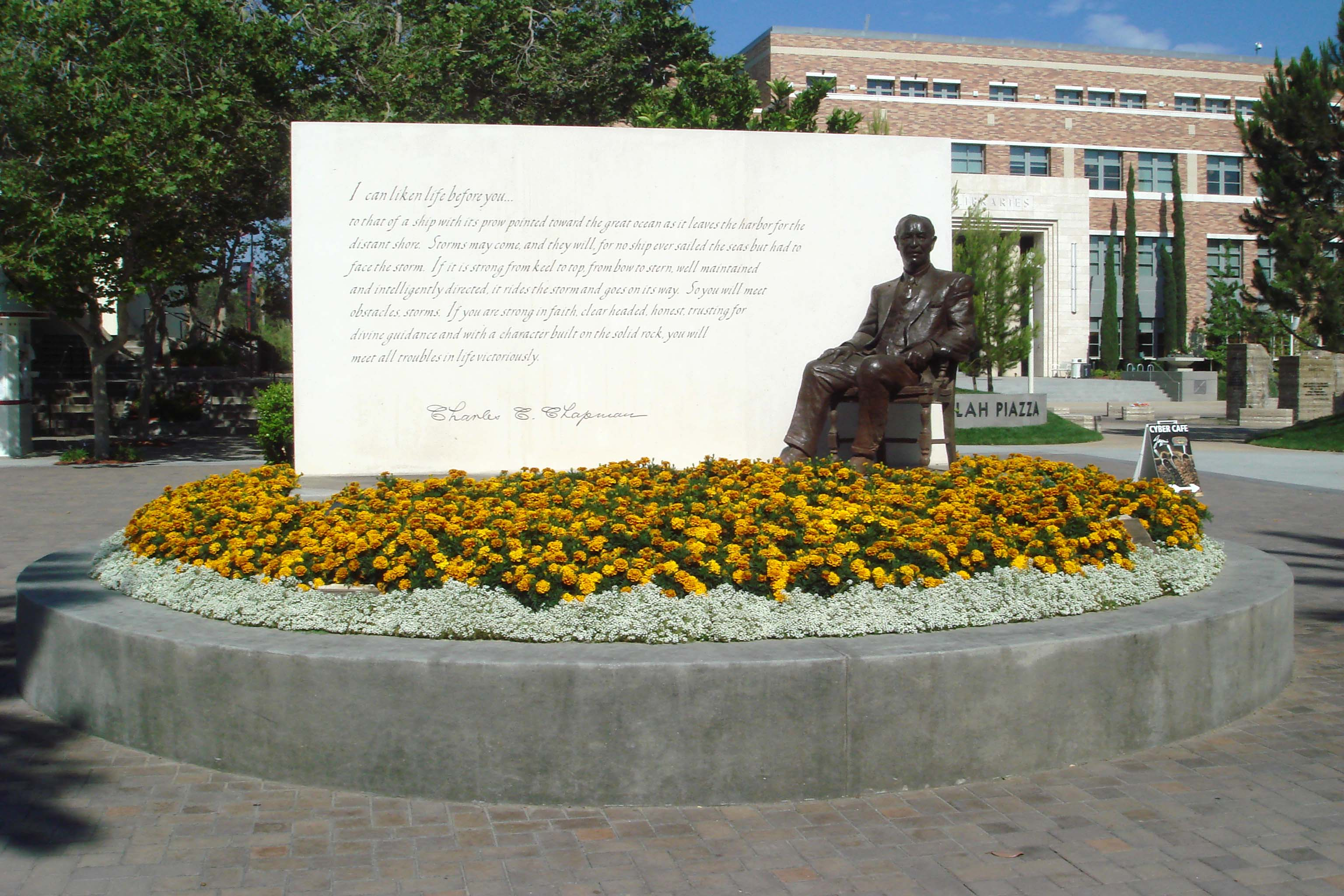
Sculpture by Raymond Persinger at the entrance of Chapman University

Persinger has created sculptures for many public and private collections, including the City of Brea, California, Chapman University and the National Geographic Museum. His work has been selected for various exhibits by prominent curators, including Smithsonian Institution curator Dr. Virginia Mecklenburg, curator and Los Angeles–based critic Peter Frank, and LACMA curator Michele Urton.

== Life and career ==
Persinger studied with Kenn Glenn, Stephen Werlick, Robert Graham and George Segal. He holds a bachelor's degree from California State University, Long Beach, and a Master of Fine Arts (MFA) from California State University, Fullerton.

In 1986, Persinger began working at Dinamation, where he created life-sized sculptures of dinosaurs, extinct mammals and sea creatures for use in museum exhibits and worked as project director and manager/art director of the sculpture department. He was credited for his claw structure theory in James Kirkland's original paper on the dinosaur Utahraptor. He left Dinamation in 1996. Persinger also worked as a freelance artist for Disneyland’s Entertainment Arts.

Persinger was the sculpture program chair at the Laguna College of Art and Design from 1995 through 2013, during this period the sculpture program was considered one of the best figurative sculpture programs in the country.

In 2008, SIAS University in China's Henan Province invited Persinger and several other artists to participate in an International Sculpture Symposium. Persinger's finished sculpture will be placed at the entrance of the SIAS campus sculpture garden. Persinger's work has been selected as an example of how public art is created on the PublicArt.org website.

As of 2008, Persinger was working on a Holocaust Monument project with poet and Holocaust survivor Peter Fischl. This monument will be placed at several museums around the world.

Persinger has recently turned to relief images in glass that examine the spiritual connection between man and nature.

== See also ==
- Contemporary realism
- Classical Realism
