= Raptor Red =

1995 book by Robert T. Bakker

- Cover of the book's first edition by Robert Bakker
- Author: Robert T. Bakker
- Genre: Science fiction
- Publisher: Bantam Books
- Publication date: October 1995 (hardcover); September 1996 (paperback)
- Publication place: United States
- Media type: Print (hardback & paperback); Audiobook
- Pages: 250 (paperback)
- ISBN: 0-553-10124-2
- OCLC: 32429989
- Dewey Decimal: 813/.54 20
- LC Class: PS3552.A43814 R3 1995

Raptor Red is a 1995 American novel by paleontologist Robert T. Bakker. The book is a third-person account of dinosaurs during the Cretaceous Period, told from the point of view of Raptor Red, a female Utahraptor. Raptor Red features many of Bakker's theories regarding dinosaurs' social habits, intelligence, and the world in which they lived.

The book follows a year in Raptor Red's life as she loses her mate, finds her family, and struggles to survive in a hostile environment. Bakker drew inspiration from Ernest Thompson Seton's works that look at life through the eyes of predators, and said that he found it enjoyable to write from a top predator's perspective. Bakker based his portrayals of dinosaurs and other prehistoric wildlife on fossil evidence, as well as studies of modern animals. The book was released in hardcover, paperback, and audiobook formats.

When released, Raptor Red was generally praised: Bakker's anthropomorphism was seen as a unique and positive aspect of the book. Criticisms of the novel included a perceived lack of characterization and average writing. Some scientists, such as paleontologist David B. Norman, took issue with the scientific theories portrayed in the novel, fearing that the public would accept them as fact, while Discovery Channel host Jay Ingram and others defended Bakker's creative decisions as provoking debate and bringing science to a wider audience.

== Background ==
Paleontologist Robert T. Bakker was motivated to write Raptor Red by his interest in dinosaur behavior and his desire to marry science and entertainment. "Nature is a drama," he said. "It is the most ripping yarn ever written. You've got life and death and sex and betrayal and the best way to approach it is through individual animals." Bakker found it "fun" to put himself into the shoes of an apex predator, considering the role much tougher than being an herbivore. He credited the turn-of-the-century naturalist Ernest Thompson Seton's works that focused on life from the perspectives of grizzly bears and wolves as having inspired him to write the novel from the dinosaur's point of view.

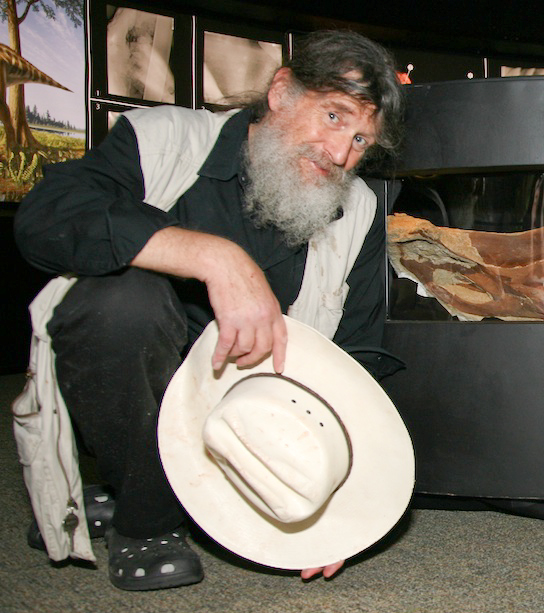
Robert Bakker at the Houston Museum of Natural Science in 2008

Raptor Red was an attempt to introduce Utahraptor to the public, as well as explain some of Bakker's theories regarding dinosaur behavior. Bakker originally suggested the genus name Utahraptor for a new dinosaur specimen that had been found by an amateur bone-hunter in Utah. Bakker was at the time consulting with the designers of the Jurassic Park film, whose largest portrayed Velociraptor—called the "big female" in the script—was coincidentally the same size as the newly discovered specimen. One of the novel's other goals was to dispel the common perception of predators as evil and portray them as creatures to be admired and empathized with. Bakker's raptors are shown as monogamous, relatively intelligent and social creatures, an assertion he defended. "The life of dinosaurian hunters was hard. Most skeletons we excavate have clear marks of old wounds," he said. "To survive and raise their young, the predators needed more than sharp teeth and strong claws. They needed social bonds." The behavior of the raptors and other animals featured in the novel was based on a combination of fossil evidence and observations of modern animals, such as chimpanzees and alligators. Bakker also advanced his theory that an asteroid impact did not kill the dinosaurs in the Cretaceous–Paleogene extinction event, but rather diseases spread through migration.

Bakker received a large advance for the novel from Bantam Books, rumored to be in the six-figure range. The book was prominently featured at the American Booksellers' Convention in Chicago, alongside Michael Crichton's The Lost World. Coverage of the event noted that both novels were on the trailing end of the dinosaur fad fueled by Jurassic Park, as the new trend in American books was shifting toward politics in the aftermath of the 1994 US elections.

Raptor Red was initially published as a mass-market paperback and hardcover book, and was later released as an audiobook by Simon & Schuster Audio, read by Megan Gallagher. Bakker's audiobook royalties—at least $34,000 by November 1995—were donated to the Tate Geological Museum in Casper, Wyoming, where he was curator.

== Synopsis ==
=== Setting and characters ===
Raptor Red takes place approximately 120 million years ago, in the Early Cretaceous period of the Mesozoic. At the time, a land bridge had formed between Asia and the Americas. This allowed groups of foreign dinosaurs to invade present-day Utah, one being Utahraptor. Raptor Red's name comes from the symbols the dinosaur learns as a hatchling to self-identify with. Bakker gives an individual view of each species of dinosaur or ancient creature in the same style as Red's experiences; these include a baby Gastonia who instinctively attacks what it does not understand with its clubbed tail, and a whip-tailed diplodocid who enjoys beating up predators. Bakker prominently features the adventures of a "fur-ball" (mammal), Aegialodon; according to the author, the emphasis was added because the Aegialodon is on the direct ancestral line to humans. Aegialodon, however, did not live in the same time and place as Utahraptor, hailing from England about 136 million years ago. Some of the other animals featured in the novel were closer in time and place to Utahraptor but not strictly contemporary. For example, fossils attributable to Acrocanthosaurus and Deinonychus are known from the same rock formation as Utahraptor (the Cedar Mountain Formation), but from sediments about five million years younger.

=== Plot ===
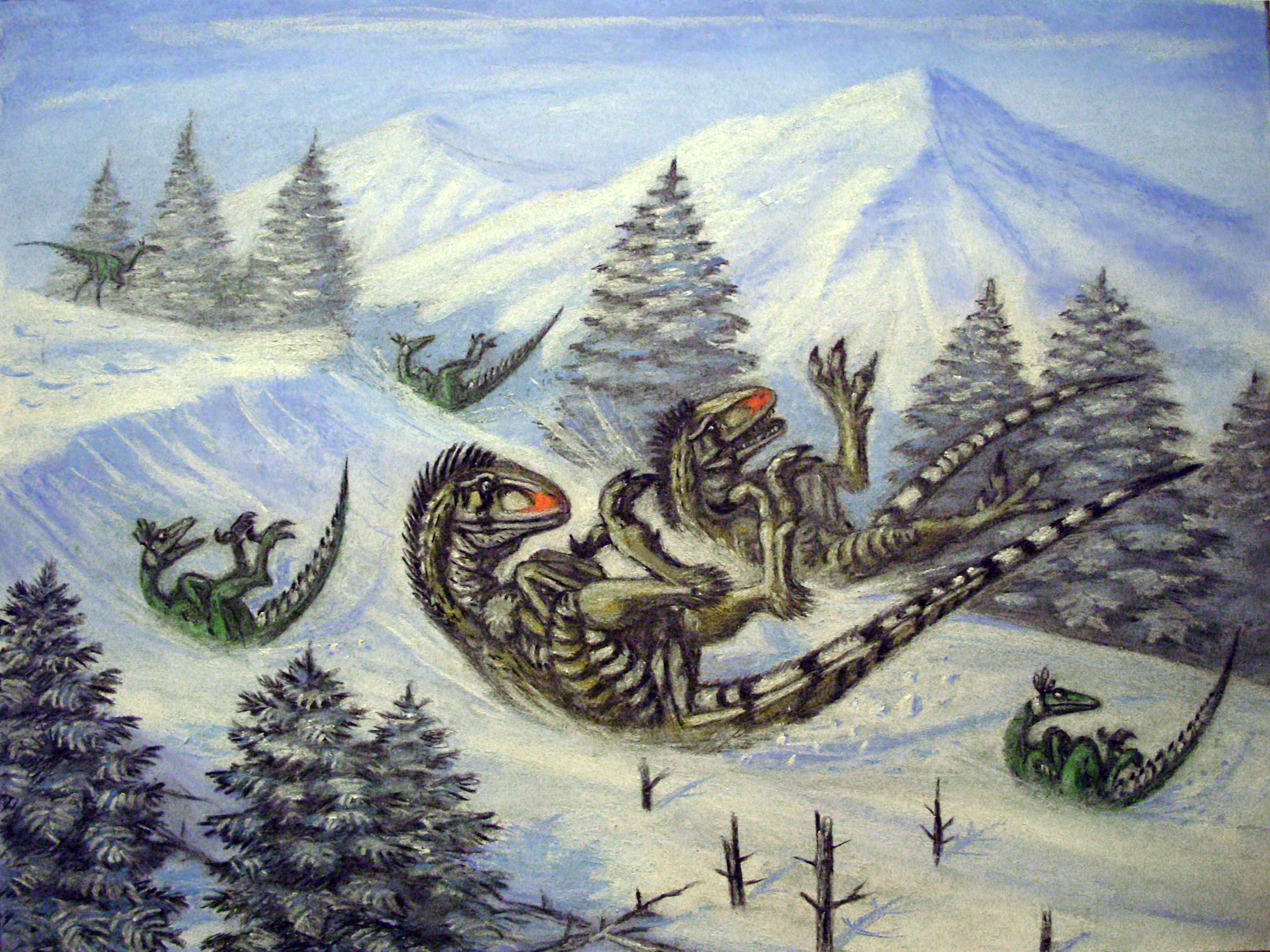
Fan art depicting the scene in which Raptor Red glides in snow

In the book's opening, the title character and her mate ambush a herd of Astrodon, large herbivorous sauropods. The Astrodon are surprised, thinking that their bulk deters smaller predators. Utahraptor, however, are much larger than any resident raptor, and proceed to take down an Astrodon with teamwork. When Red's mate climbs onto the dead Astrodon, the corpse rolls in the mud, trapping the male under the bulk of the animal. Despite Red's best efforts, her mate suffocates. Despondent, Red wanders around the floodplain, nearly starving since a Utahraptor cannot successfully hunt big game on its own.

Red follows a familiar scent and is reunited with her sister, a single mother with three chicks. The two hunt together and bring food back to the nest for the young. A white pterosaur, one Red has seen since she hatched, helps the two by finding carrion and prey in exchange for a helping of meat. On one hunting expedition, when the two adult Utahraptor are stalking a herd of Iguanodon, Red spies a young male Utahraptor that is watching their prey. He begins a courtship dance for Red, but Red's sister chases him off, hissing. Her growls agitate the Iguanodon, who stampede; the male hastily leaves. After climbing into a tree to escape a flash flood, Red encounters the male raptor again, who performs a courtship dance while hanging onto the tree branches. Red's sister begrudgingly allows the male to stay with them, provided he steers clear of her chicks.

For a while, Red and her pack are happy, feeding off the plentiful carrion left by receding flood waters, but the pack's way of life is upset by an invasion of large Acrocanthosaurus, huge meat-eating dinosaurs. The added competition for food puts strain on the pack, as does the unexpected death of one of the chicks. A fight erupts between the male raptor and Red's sister. Red, torn between a prospective mate and her kin, tries to defuse the situation. Two Acrocanthosaurus watch the commotion and take the opportunity to attack the raptors. Meanwhile, a Kronosaurus ambushes one of the chicks on the beach. Seeing the danger, Red lures one Acrocanthosaurus into deep water where it is dragged under by the Kronosaurus. Red saves her family, but her consort is forced away by Red's sister.

Facing continued threats from the Acrocanthosaurus, Red, her sister and the chicks are forced up into the mountains. They encounter ice and snow for the first time, and kill a segnosaur in a cave, turning the den into their nest. The older chick accompanies the two adults on hunting expeditions. One day the raptors encounter a strange creature they have never seen—a whip-tailed diplodocid who inflicts wounds on Red and her sister; the older chick is forced to set off alone and find the pack's food. This calamity coincides with the arrival of a large pack of smaller raptors known as Deinonychus. They surround the nest and wait for the wounded raptors to become weak enough to attack.

Red's sister dies, and Red is crippled and defenseless against the smaller dinosaurs. The Deinonychus close in but are driven back by the sudden arrival of the older Utahraptor chick and Red's consort, who defend the nest. Some time later, the old white pterosaur circles over Red's mountain stronghold, and finds the pack has grown considerably. Red and her niece have chicks of their own, who are having fun rolling down a hill. The satisfied pterosaur leaves, having found a mate as well.

== Analysis ==
Bakker anthropomorphizes the dinosaurs in Raptor Red; the raptors and other wildlife are depicted as demonstrating intellect and emotion. Doctor Patricia E. Chu classified Raptor Red as a cinematic and modern "animal story" in the vein of previous works such as Jack London's White Fang. While the animals in Raptor Red are heavily anthropomorphized—Bakker has one dinosaur aware of its own mortality—they are also described in highly technical or technologic terms, such as describing a raptor's brain like a computer, or its imprinting through descriptions of biochemistry.

== Reception ==
Raptor Red was favorably received by critics and the mainstream press. Praise was given to Bakker's anthropomorphizing of the dinosaurs; a reviewer for the Toronto Star said that "Raptor Red does for dinosaurs what some nature writing does for creatures alive today: it turns data into stories. And stories are what all of us need to make these animals—even dinosaurs—come alive." Mark Nichols of Maclean's said that Bakker's success lay in making the reader hope that the dinosaurs were indeed creatures as Bakker portrayed. James Gorman, writing for Natural History, compared Bakker's heroine to a "bloody-minded Jane Austen character—bound by family ties, thoroughly responsible, yet longing for independence and love." A review in The Psychological Record recommended the book as a "conceptually-rich and controversial" explanation for dinosaur behavior.

While the Library Journal's review praised Bakker's sympathetic characterization for never becoming cartoonish, other critics felt that the anthropomorphizing of the dinosaurs veered too far into exaggeration. Other criticisms included a lack of character needed for truly engrossing fiction. Reviewers described Bakker's work as genuine, despite flaws such as inconsistent writing. Billboard praised Megan Gallagher's narration of the audiobook, with its continuous sound effects and dramatic music to creating an "aural picture". Entertainment Weekly gave Raptor Red its "Best of Breed Award" for a "captivating novel about animal life".

Many critical reviews of the work came from scientists who objected to Bakker's dramatic license and departure from established facts. The paleontologist Thomas Holtz noted that Bakker combined fauna in ways not directly supported by the fossil record; for example, several of the dinosaurs featured in the books lived millions of years after Utahraptor died out. Michael Taylor, curator of vertebrate paleontology at the National Museums of Scotland, panned the book, saying that "Raptor Red is an accurate portrayal only within the context of uncertainties over the reconstruction of fossil animals as living forms ... Bakker's postscript never really admits these uncertainties." David B. Norman criticized the book as "no more than a children's adventure story—and a rather poorly written one at that ... The merging of science and fantasy is at its worst in books like Raptor Red because none but the experts can disentangle fact from fiction; this type of nonsense turns an uninformed reader into a misinformed one." Jay Ingram, from the Discovery Channel, published a rebuttal, saying, "The most important point is that Bakker's portrayal of the dinosaurs in Raptor Red is vivid—vivid in a way few museum displays or factual accounts can be. And if it turns out in the long run that some of the speculation is unwarranted, who cares? Bob Bakker has given us a unique window onto the era of dinosaurs."

According to Bakker, the novel's success led to interest in a movie deal from Hollywood. Producer Robert Halmi Sr. made deals with Jim Henson's Creature Shop for film adaptations of Animal Farm and Raptor Red in 1996. No official project was announced.

== See also ==
- The Dinosaur Heresies
