= Dinamation =

American robotics effect company

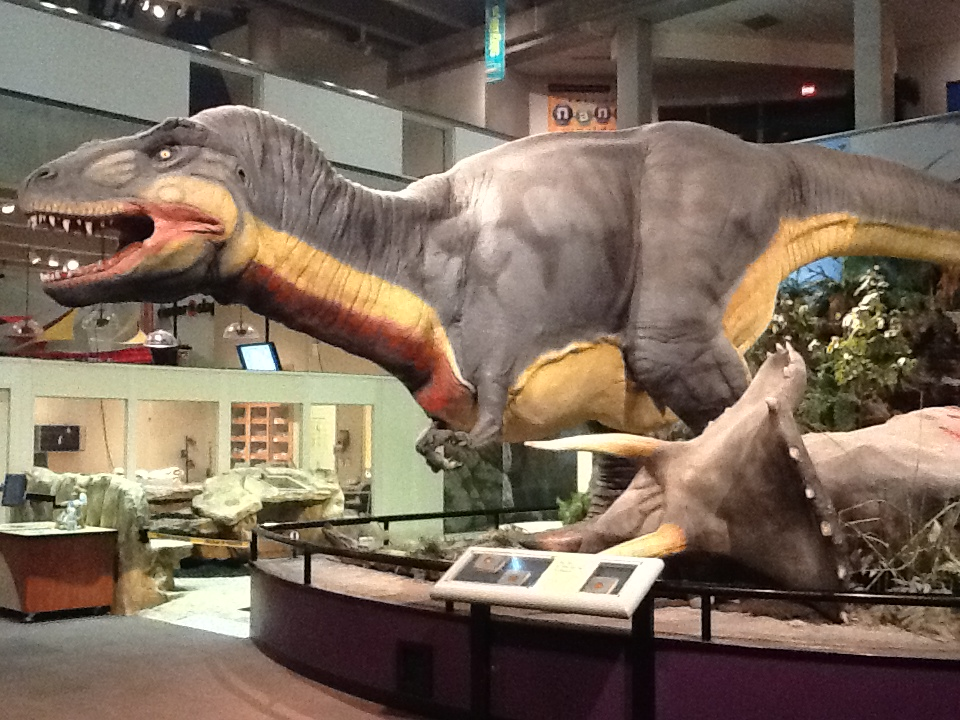
A Dinamation built Tyrannosaurus on display at the St. Louis Science Center.

Dinamation International Corporation was a robotics effects company based in San Juan Capistrano, Santa Ana, and Tustin, California, United States.

== History ==
It was founded in 1982 by former airline pilot Chris Mays and some neighbors and dropped in March 2001. (A 2001 Wall Street Journal article describes the rise and fall and disappearance of its founder, Chris Mays.) Originally begun as a way to lease handmade, one-of-a-kind, Japanese-produced robot dinosaurs to North American shopping malls, in time Dinamation defied its original mandate and came to produce its own production-line models for exhibit in science museums and zoos worldwide. Dinamation was an example of an American company following, improving upon, and then outpacing its Japanese rivals.

Dinamation started out with a dozen movie special effects technicians, sculptors, painters, and engineers housed in third-tier industrial spaces in Santa Ana, California, where municipal, safety and corporate oversight was minimal and creative freedom maximal. Given vague guidelines and a selection of consumer-grade dinosaur books for reference, they produced one "beta" show (which was sold, not leased) for a museum in Boston and also sold a display to the Mesa Southwest Museum in Grand Junction, CO, US (D.I.C. creatures are still on active exhibit there). Techniques improved (and so did scientific fidelity, up to a point, under the guidance of paleontologists Dr.s Robert Bakker and George Callison and given the contributions made by many skilled engineers, inventor/sculptors such as public artists Raymond Persinger and Marianne O'Barr, movie effects artists Steve Koch (also designed paint schemes), Brian Sipe and Matt Croteau. By 1988, Dinamation had grown to 150 employees embedded in a complex corporate structure and operating out of a 39,000-square-foot (3,600 m^{2}) facility in Tustin, California.

Dinamation Allosaurus model outside a shop in Drumheller

Museum attendances soared with every visit by the "Dinosaurs Alive!" shows and remained fairly high afterwards, boosting the revenues (and often the survival) of almost every venue. Dinamation was for a time quite successful, with exhibits around the world in important museums including the Smithsonian National Museum of Natural History, the National Geographic Museum, and the British Museum of Natural History.

At the end, under a cloud of financial mystery, over 700 American-made 'creatures' were left in limbo, scattered in science museums, trucks, and shipping containers across the United States and abroad. Some of the orphaned robots have become permanent parts of the displays in the museums that had shows running when the company folded. Other dinos were sold, lost, disassembled, disposed of, or recycled as spare parts for other dinos in better shape. Other final vestiges of Dinamation can be seen as ubiquitous uncredited photographs of the dinosaur robots and preproduction art, scattered in children's books, toy art, video backgrounds, and recycled magazine illustrations, as well as appearances in cinema, for example, Woody Allen's film, Alice. Images of the sculptures in process and in completed sculptures in museum displays are available online.

However, by far the largest collection of Dinamation creatures ended up as the possessions of Wonder Works USA, in Abilene, TX. WonderWorks is now owned by Jack Hull, who has been leasing out this collection since 2001 (with the, now former, partner of Hull, John Thomas).

This collection has been kept in service by WonderWorks with the reliance upon two former Dinamation technicians, Ken Diggs and Mike Short, that formed Creature Craft in Nebraska.

== Sculptures ==
Parasaurolophus made from Dinamation molds, Bristol Zoological Gardens

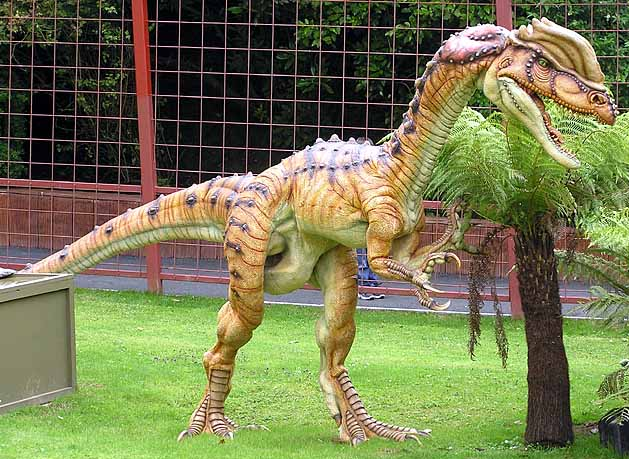
Dilophosaurus made from Dinamation molds, Combe Martin Wildlife and Dinosaur Park

Some examples of Dinamation's sculptures can still be seen at the Otway Fly in Victoria, Australia. They can also be viewed at the Museum of Western Colorado's Dinosaur Journey Museum in Fruita, Colorado. These include a Dilophosaurus, Triceratops, Stegosaurus, Utahraptor, and Apatosaurus robots, along with Tyrannosaurus sculptures.

A (very) partial list of the Dinamation robot creatures:

- Tyrannosaurus rex, 1/2-size
- Tyrannosaurus rex, full-size
- Apatosaurus, 1/2-size
- Stegosaurus stenops, 1/2-size
- Allosaurus fragilis, full-size
- Triceratops sp., 1/2-size
- Thalassomedon sp., full-size
- Deinonychus sp., full-size
- Parasaurolophus sp., 1/2-size
- Pachycephalosaurus sp., 1/2-size
- Dimetrodon sp., full-size
- Tenontosaurus, full-size, dead
- Pterygotus sp., full-size
- Utahraptor sp., full-size
- Protoceratops and two Velociraptors, 1/2-size
- Dilophosaurus, full-size

and various neotenous 'baby' dinosaurs, including hatching eggs and a pteranodon feeding a fish to youths in a rocky "nest". Others included prehistoric mammals, whales, a great white shark, an 8-limbed Archeteuthis, or "giant squid," giant insects, and versions of some animals from Dougal Dixon's book After Man: A Zoology Of The Future.
