= Peter Fischl =

Peter L. Fischl (July 19, 1930 – February 12, 2018) was a survivor of the Holocaust, a poet and a public speaker, who dedicated much of his life to educating people about the Holocaust and the importance of acceptance of others. Fischl worked on a project with the sculptor Raymond Persinger to create a monument to "The Little Polish Boy."

During the Holocaust, Fischl hid in a Catholic school in Budapest, Hungary with 60 other Jewish children. His father was taken by the Nazis and never seen again.

A documentary on Fischl's life and his efforts to educate young people about intolerance, is in the final stages of editing. The film, produced by Peter Musurlian of Globalist Films, is called, "Holocaust Soliloquy."

Peter Fischl died in Chino Hills, California on February 12, 2018. He was 88 years old.

== Published Writings ==
- Poem – "To the Little Polish Boy Standing with His Arms Up."
- Autobiography – "And The World Who Said Nothing."
- Stamp of the Little Polish Boy - The authentic Postal stamps can be purchased from Peter Fischl and collected or used as a stamp. This stamp spreads the message that it is important to not be prejudice and to love your fellow man.
