= Stephen Werlick =

American sculptor

Stephen Werlick (1932–2010) was an American sculptor from New York. He completed public and private commissions and participated in group and solo exhibitions in Rome, New York, and California. He was an instructor of sculpture at California State University, Long Beach from 1964 to 1999, greatly influencing sculpture and public art especially in the Los Angeles and Orange County areas in addition to the art students who came to study with him from throughout the U. S. and abroad.

Early Years: Werlick grew up in the Bronx. He studied at Cooper Union Art School, New York, where he took courses with Milton Hebald, John Hovannes, George Kratina and Leo Amino. He earned an M.F.A. in Sculpture from Tulane University’s Newcomb Art School, studying with George Rickey.

He received a Fulbright Fellowship, 1956–1958, to Munich, Germany, where he studied sculpture and bronze casting with Heinrich Kirchner. Werlick also was awarded the Rome Prize 1961–1964, to the American Academy in Rome, Italy.

His earlier work celebrates societal human conditions as depicted in monument-like groupings of figures interacting with and through various angled planes. The feminine form is celebrated in his classical bronze figures, portraits and reliefs. His mid-career brought several commissions, among them the FINA Prize Sculpture for the Munich Olympics and World Swimming Competitions, a commission for a Holocaust memorial for Temple Judea in Southern California, a Processional Cross for the Loyola Marymount University Chapel, a bronze crucifix and candelabra for St. Joseph’s Cathedral in Los Angeles. The FINA sculpture is in the Fort Lauderdale Sports Hall of Fame.

In his later years his work took on more expressive forms. Adding to his extensive body of work are his transformations of wood into undulating pieces.
