= The Dinosaur Heresies =

Book by Robert T. Bakker

- Paperback edition front cover, Illustration by John Gurche (1985)
- Author: Robert T. Bakker
- Language: English
- Publisher: Citadel Press (current edition)
- Publication date: 1986
- Publication place: United States
- Media type: Print/Hardcover
- Pages: 481 pp.
- ISBN: 0-8217-5608-7
- OCLC: 36439291

The Dinosaur Heresies: New Theories Unlocking the Mystery of the Dinosaurs and Their Extinction is a 1986 book written by Robert T. Bakker exploring extant evidence indicating that dinosaurs, rather than being cold-blooded and wholly lizard-like, were warm-blooded, agile creatures more similar to modern birds than to lizards or other reptiles. Although controversial on publication in 1986, much of The Dinosaur Heresies now represents the prevalent view in paleontological circles (although other parts have been outdated by more current research).

The main arguments used to show that dinosaurs were warm-blooded are:

- Almost all animals that walk upright today are warm-blooded, and dinosaurs walked upright.
- The hearts of warm-blooded animals can pump much more effectively than the hearts of cold-blooded animals. Therefore, the giant sauropod dinosaur Brachiosaurus must have had the type of heart associated with warm-blooded animals in order to pump blood all the way up to its head.
- Dinosaurs such as Deinonychus led a very active life, which is much more compatible with a warm-blooded animal.
- Some dinosaurs lived in northern latitudes, where it would have been impossible for cold-blooded animals to keep warm.
- The rapid rate of speciation and evolution found in dinosaurs is typical of warm-blooded animals and atypical of cold-blooded animals.
- The predator/prey ratio of predatory dinosaurs to their prey is a signature trait of warm-blooded predators rather than cold-blooded ones.
- Birds are warm-blooded. Birds evolved from dinosaurs, therefore a change to a warm-blooded metabolism must have taken place at some point; there is far more change between dinosaurs and their ancestors, the archosaurs, than between dinosaurs and birds.
- Warm-blooded metabolisms are evolutionary advantages for top predators and large herbivores; if the dinosaurs had not been warm-blooded, there should be fossil evidence showing mammals evolving to fill these ecological niches. No such evidence exists; in fact, mammals by the end of the Cretaceous had become smaller and smaller from their synapsid ancestors.
- Dinosaurs grew rapidly, evidence for which can be found by observing cross-sections of their bones.
