= Robert T. Bakker =

American paleontologist (born 1945)

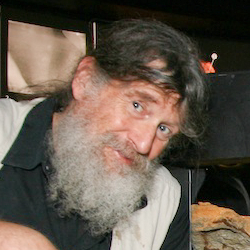
- Bakker in 2008
- Born: March 24, 1945 (age 81); Bergen County, New Jersey, United States
- Education: Yale University (BA); Harvard University (PhD)
- Known for: The "dinosaur renaissance"
- Scientific career
- Fields: Paleontology
- Workplaces: Johns Hopkins University; Houston Museum of Natural Science
- Doctoral advisor: John Ostrom
- Doctoral students: Blaire Van Valkenburgh

Robert Thomas Bakker (born March 24, 1945) is an American paleontologist who helped reshape modern theories about dinosaurs, particularly by adding support to the theory that some dinosaurs were endothermic (warm-blooded). Along with his mentor John Ostrom, Bakker was responsible for initiating the ongoing "dinosaur renaissance" in paleontological studies, beginning with Bakker's article "Dinosaur Renaissance" in the April 1975 issue of Scientific American. His specialty is the ecological context and behavior of dinosaurs.

Bakker has been a major proponent of the theory that dinosaurs were warm-blooded, smart, fast, and adaptable. He published his first paper on dinosaur endothermy in 1968. His seminal work, The Dinosaur Heresies, was published in 1986. He revealed the first evidence of parental care at nesting sites for Allosaurus. He also observed evidence in support of Eldredge and Gould's theory of punctuated equilibrium in dinosaur populations. Bakker currently serves as the Curator of Paleontology for the Houston Museum of Natural Science.

== Early life, family and education ==
Bakker was born in Bergen County, New Jersey. He has attributed his interest in dinosaurs to his reading an article in the September 7, 1953, issue of Life magazine. He graduated from Ridgewood High School in 1963.

At Yale University, Bakker studied under John Ostrom, an early proponent of the new view of dinosaurs, and later earned his PhD at Harvard University.

== Career ==
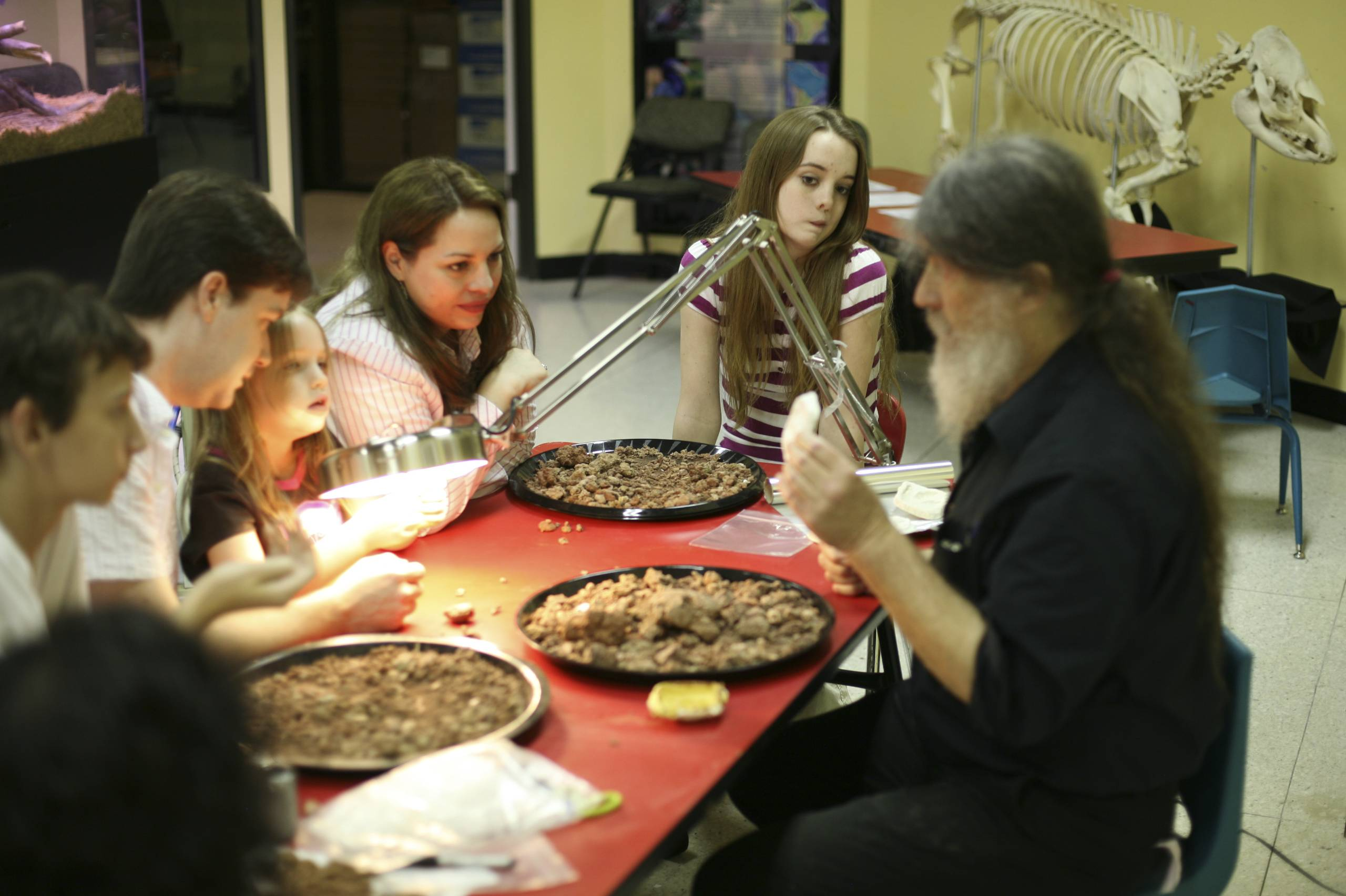
Bakker (right) teaching at the HMNS in 2008

Bakker taught anatomy at Johns Hopkins University in Baltimore, Maryland, and Earth and Space Sciences, where future artist Gregory S. Paul worked and collaborated informally under his guidance.

Most of Bakker's fieldwork has been done in Wyoming, especially at Como Bluff, but he has traveled as far as Mongolia and South Africa in search of dinosaur habitats. He also worked as an assistant at the University of Colorado.

== Theories ==
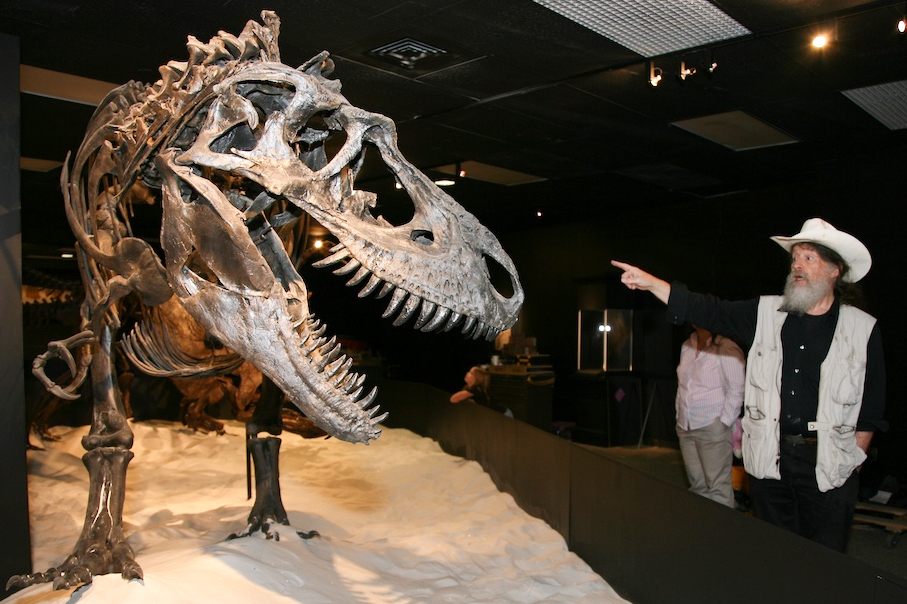
Mounted Gorgosaurus skeleton with several bone injuries, from the "Dinosaur Mummy: CSI" exhibit at the HMNS, Bakker on the right

In his 1986 work The Dinosaur Heresies, Bakker puts forth the theory that dinosaurs were warm-blooded. His evidence for this includes:

- Almost all modern animals that walk upright are warm-blooded, and dinosaurs walked upright.
- The hearts of warm-blooded animals can pump much more effectively than the hearts of cold-blooded animals. Therefore, the giant Brachiosaurus must have had the type of heart associated with warm-blooded animals in order to pump blood up to its head.
- Dinosaurs such as Deinonychus led a very active life, behavior which is much more compatible with a warm-blooded animal.
- Some dinosaurs lived in northern latitudes where it would have been impossible for cold-blooded dinosaurs to maintain their body temperature.
- The rapid rate of speciation and evolution found in dinosaurs is typical of warm-blooded animals and atypical of cold-blooded animals.
- The hypothesized population ratios of predatory dinosaurs to their prey is a signature trait of warm-blooded predators rather than cold-blooded ones.
- Birds are warm-blooded and evolved from dinosaurs; therefore, a change to a warm-blooded metabolism must have taken place at some point. There is far more change between dinosaurs and their ancestors (basal archosaurs) than between non-avian dinosaurs and birds.
- A warm-blooded metabolism is an evolutionary advantage for top predators and large herbivores; if dinosaurs had not been warm-blooded there should be fossil evidence of warm-blooded animals evolving to fill these ecological niches. No such evidence exists; in fact, by the end of the Cretaceous, mammals had become much smaller than their stem-mammal ancestors.
- Dinosaurs grew rapidly, evidence for which can be found by observing cross-sections of their bones. Warm-blooded animals grow at a similar rate.

Bakker is also a proponent of the idea that flowering plants evolved because of their interactions with dinosaurs. He also believes the principal cause of extinction for all non-avian dinosaurs was in fact a plague caused by invasive species crossing land bridges, retorting that, had the comet been large enough to kill off every non-avian dinosaur, it would have also wiped out the various taxa known to have survived the K-T extinction event.

== Fiction ==
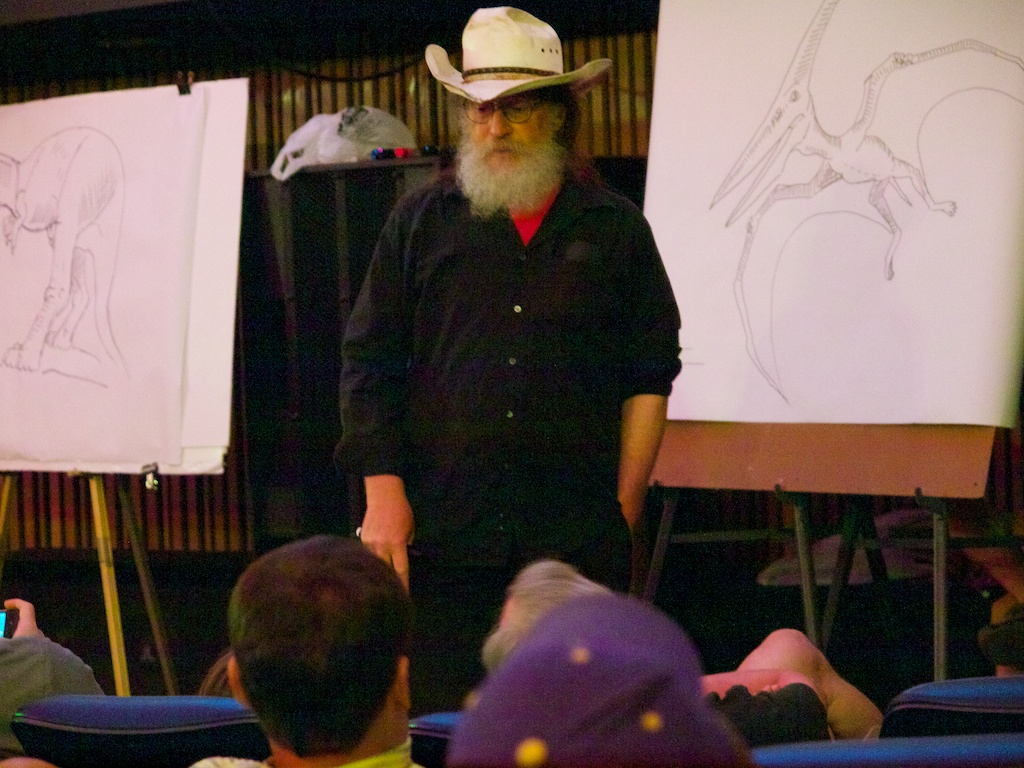
Bakker lecturing in 2011

Bakker's fictional novel Raptor Red tells of a year in the life of a female Utahraptor during the lower Cretaceous. In the story, Bakker elaborates on his knowledge of the behavior of dromaeosaurids ("raptor" dinosaurs) and life at the time of their existence.

== Religious beliefs ==
As a Pentecostal, Ecumenical Christian minister, Bakker has said there is no real conflict between religion and science, and that evolution of species and geologic history is compatible with religious belief. Bakker views the Bible as an ethical and moral guide, rather than a literal timetable of events in the history of life. He has advised non-believers and creationists to read the views put forward by Saint Augustine, who argued against a literal understanding of the Book of Genesis.

== Influence on popular media ==
Bakker's earliest known mass media appearance was in the 1976 Nova episode "The Hot-Blooded Dinosaurs" aired on WGBH Boston.

Bakker actively participated in the 1985 CBS documentary Dinosaur!, appearing several times in the programme. He appears in the 1989 BBC series Lost Worlds, Vanished Lives presented by David Attenborough, in the third episode Dinosaur discussing his theory regarding Tyrannosaurus rex and other theropods being warm-blooded animals. Bakker later renamed Attenborosaurus, a species of plesiosaur after Sir David.

Bakker was featured heavily in the documentary The Great Dinosaur Hunt, part of The Infinite Voyage series of documentaries. The Great Dinosaur Hunt first aired on January 4, 1989.

Bakker was an advisor for the 1992 PBS series, The Dinosaurs!. He had many appearances in the TLC television series Paleoworld, and was also among the advisors for the film Jurassic Park, with some of the early concept art being informed by Bakker's works. Bakker also appeared in the Sega CD version of Jurassic Park.

Dr. Bakker was a guest in episode 27 ("Surprise") of the Williams Street animated TV series Space Ghost Coast to Coast.

Bakker appears in the 1992 program Whatever Happened to the Dinosaurs? (released on videocasette) and was profiled on location at his Wyoming dinosaur excavation site in a 1992 episode of the Discover Magazine TV series on The Disney Channel.

Bakker and his 1986 book are mentioned in the original Jurassic Park. The bearded paleontologist Dr. Robert Burke, who is eaten by a Tyrannosaurus rex in Steven Spielberg's film The Lost World: Jurassic Park (released in 1997), is an affectionate caricature of Bakker. In real life, Bakker has argued for a predatory T. rex, while Bakker's rival paleontologist Jack Horner views it as primarily a scavenger. According to Horner, Spielberg wrote the character of Burke and had him killed by the T. rex as a favor for Horner. After the film came out, Bakker recognized himself in Burke, loved the caricature, and actually sent Horner a message saying, "See, I told you T. rex was a hunter!". In 1993, Bakker starred in a Sega Genesis: Jurassic Park TV commercial.

Sir Dr. Robert Bakker of rock band the Protomen takes his stage name from the paleontologist. The Nashville, Tennessee-based band has stage names inspired by 1980s and 1990s pop culture icons.

== Bibliography ==
- Bakker, Robert T. (1986), The Dinosaur Heresies, William Morrow.
- Bakker, Robert T. (1995), Raptor Red, Bantam Books.

== See also ==
- Dinosaur renaissance
- Physiology of dinosaurs
