= James I. Kirkland =

American paleontologist

James Ian Kirkland (born August 24, 1954) is an American paleontologist and geologist. He has worked with dinosaur remains from the southwest United States of America and Mexico and has been responsible for discovering new and important genera. He named (or worked with others in naming) Animantarx, Cedarpelta, Eohadrosaurus (nomen nudum, now named Eolambia), Jeyawati, Gastonia, Mymoorapelta, Nedcolbertia, Utahraptor, Zuniceratops, Europelta and Diabloceratops. At the same site where he found Gastonia and Utahraptor, Kirkland has also excavated fossils of the therizinosaur Falcarius.

== Biography ==
Kirkland was born on August 24, 1954, in Weymouth, Massachusetts. He graduated from Marshfield High School in Marshfield, Massachusetts in 1972, before moving to New Mexico to seek further education.

== Career ==
Kirkland attended the New Mexico Institute of Mining and Technology in Socorro, New Mexico, where he obtained his B.S. in Geological Sciences in 1972. He then attended Northern Arizona University in Flagstaff, Arizona, where he served as Student Body President from 1975 to 1976. He obtained an M.S. in Geology here in 1977. In 1983, he began working towards his PhD at the University of Colorado, Boulder, which he obtained in 1990.

Kirkland worked as an adjunct Professor of Geology at Mesa State College, Grand Junction, Colorado, USA adjunct Associate Professor at University of Utah, Salt Lake City, Utah and a Research Associate of the Denver Museum of Natural History in the Denver Museum of Nature and Science, Colorado Boulevard, Denver, Colorado. For the past two decades he has been the Utah State Paleontologist for Utah Geological Survey. He issues permits for paleontological research on Utah state lands, keeps tabs on paleontological research and issues across the state, and promotes Utah's paleontological resources for the public good.

=== Mesozoic ===
An expert on the Mesozoic, Kirkland has spent more than thirty years excavating fossils across the southwestern US and Mexico authoring and coauthoring more than 75 professional papers. The reconstruction of ancient marine and terrestrial environments, biostratigraphy, paleoecology, and mass extinctions are some of his interests. In addition to dinosaurs, he has described and named many fossil mollusks and fish.

=== Cretaceous ===
Kirkland's researches in the middle Cretaceous of Utah indicate that the origins of Alaska and the first great Asian-North American faunal interchange occurred about 100 million years ago, which his numerous trips to China and Mongolia have substantiated.

== Star Trek ==
Together with Diane Carey, he has written a Star Trek novel, First Frontier.
