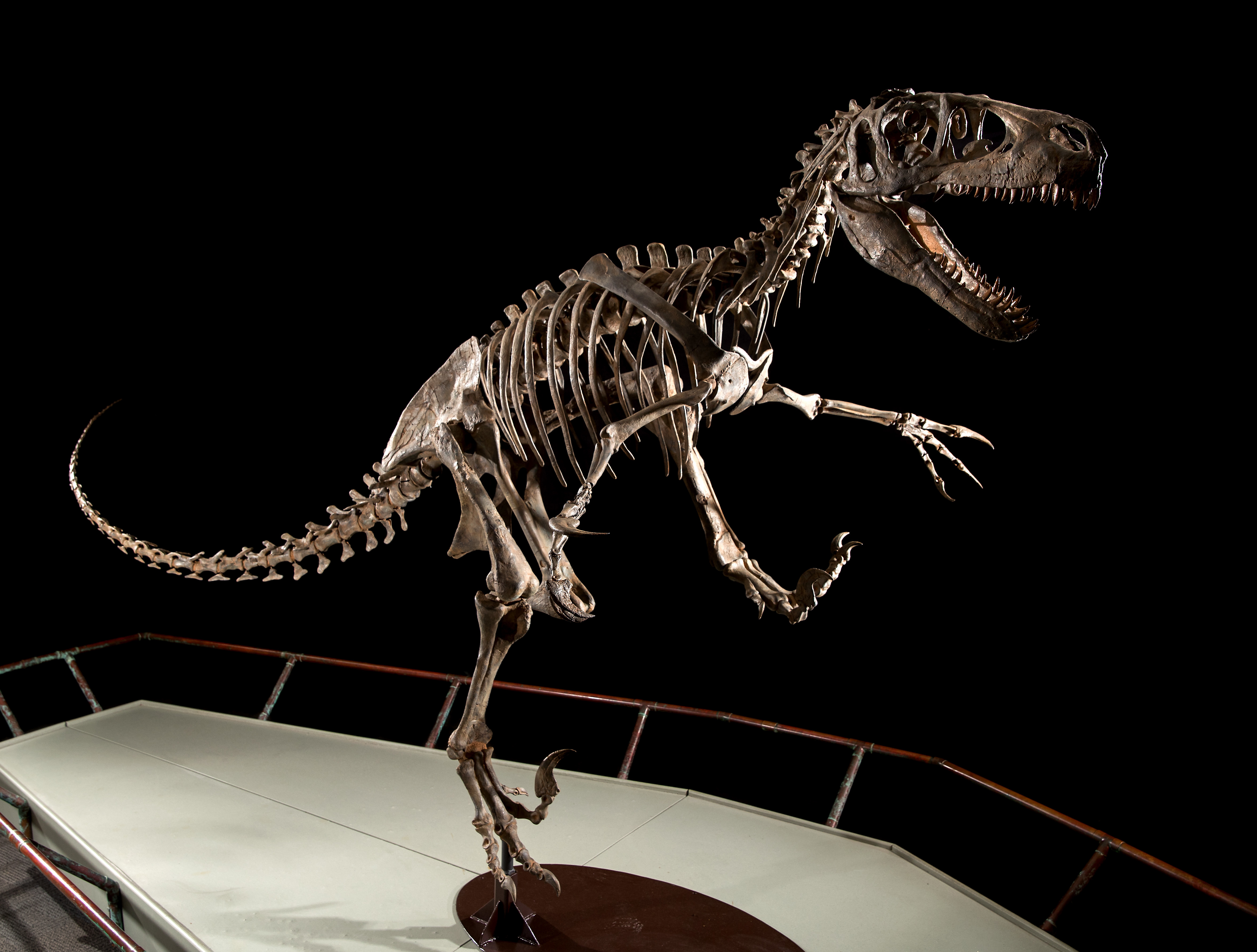
- Reconstructed skeleton in BYU Museum of Paleontology

Scientific classification
- Kingdom: Animalia
- Phylum: Chordata
- Class: Reptilia
- Clade: Dinosauria
- Clade: Saurischia
- Clade: Theropoda
- Family: †Dromaeosauridae
- Clade: †Eudromaeosauria
- Subfamily: †Dromaeosaurinae
- Genus: †Utahraptor; Kirkland, Gaston & Burge, 1993

Type species
- †Utahraptor ostrommaysi Kirkland et al., 1993

= Utahraptor =

Utahraptor Temporal range: Early Cretaceous (Berriasian – Valanginian), 139–134.6 Ma Possible Hauterivian–Barremian record

Genus of dinosaur from the Early Cretaceous

Utahraptor (meaning "Utah's predator") is a genus of large dromaeosaurid (a group of feathered carnivorous theropods) dinosaur that lived during the Early Cretaceous period from around 139 to 135 million years ago in what is now the United States. The genus was described in 1993 by American paleontologist James Kirkland and colleagues with the type species Utahraptor ostrommaysi, based on fossils that had been unearthed earlier from the Cedar Mountain Formation of Utah. Later, many additional specimens were described including those from the skull and postcranium in addition to those of younger individuals.

It is the largest-known member of the family Dromaeosauridae, measuring about 6–7 meters (20–23 ft) long and typically weighing around 500 kilograms (1,100 lb). As a heavily built, ground-dwelling, bipedal carnivore, its large size and variety of unique features have earned it attention in both pop culture and the scientific community. The jaws of Utahraptor were lined with small, serrated teeth that were used in conjunction with a large "killing claw" on its second toe to dispatch its prey. Its skull was boxy and elongated, akin to other dromaeosaurids like Dromaeosaurus and Velociraptor.

Being a carnivore, Utahraptor was adapted to hunt the other animals of the Cedar Mountain Formation ecosystem such as ankylosaurs and iguanodonts. Evidence from the leg physiology supports the idea of Utahraptor being an ambush predator, in contrast to other dromaeosaurs that were pursuit predators. Fossil remains of several individuals of various ages have been found together, suggesting that Utahraptor was gregarious (social) and practiced degrees of post nestling care.

== Discovery and naming ==
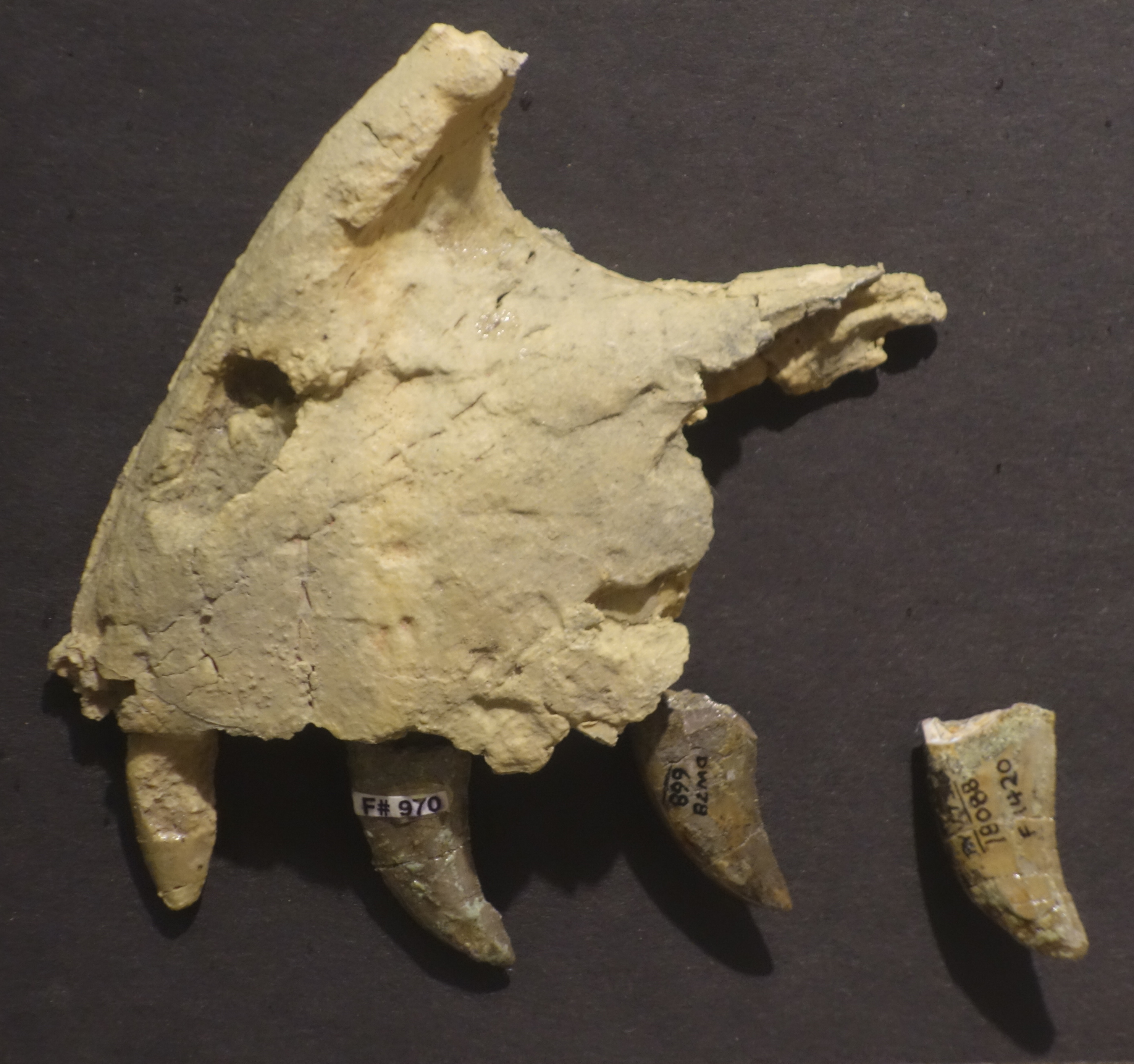
Premaxilla of BYU 7510 14585

The first specimens of Utahraptor were found in 1975 by Jim Jensen in the Dalton Wells Quarry of Utah, near the town of Moab, but did not receive much attention. After the find of a large claw by Carl Limone in October 1991, James Kirkland, Robert Gaston and Donald Burge uncovered further remains of Utahraptor in 1991 in the Gaston Quarry in Grand County, Utah, within the Yellow Cat and Poison Strip members of the Cedar Mountain Formation. The holotype of Utahraptor, CEUM 184v.86, consists of a second pedal ungual, with potentially assigned elements from other specimens: pedal ungual CEUM 184v.294, tibia CEUM 184v.260 and premaxilla CEUM 184v.400. The holotype is housed in the paleontology collections of the Prehistoric Museum at Utah State University Eastern. Brigham Young University, the depository of Jensen's finds, currently houses the largest collection of Utahraptor fossils.

The type species, Utahraptor ostrommaysi, was named by Kirkland, Gaston and Burge in June 1993. The genus name Utahraptor is in reference to Utah, where the remains were found. The specific name, ostrommaysi, is in honor to John Ostrom for his investigations on Deinonychus and its relationships to birds, as well as Chris Mays, who helped in the research of Utahraptor by founding Dinamation. From his description, Kirkland stated the meaning of genus name to be "Utah's predator," but the Latin word raptor translates to 'robber' or 'plunderer', not 'predator'. Earlier, it had been intended to name the species "U. spielbergi" after film director Steven Spielberg. It was alleged that this was in exchange for Spielberg funding paleontological research, and that the name was changed because agreement couldn’t be reached on the amount of financial assistance. Kirkland, however, later expressed that this was a misquote. He had changed the name to U. ostrommaysi shortly before the publication of the paper, as Universal Studios has begun threatening to sue museums that have exhibits with the word "Jurassic" in their titles; Dinamation, Kirkland's employers with connections to various museums, thus implored him to change the name, which he did.

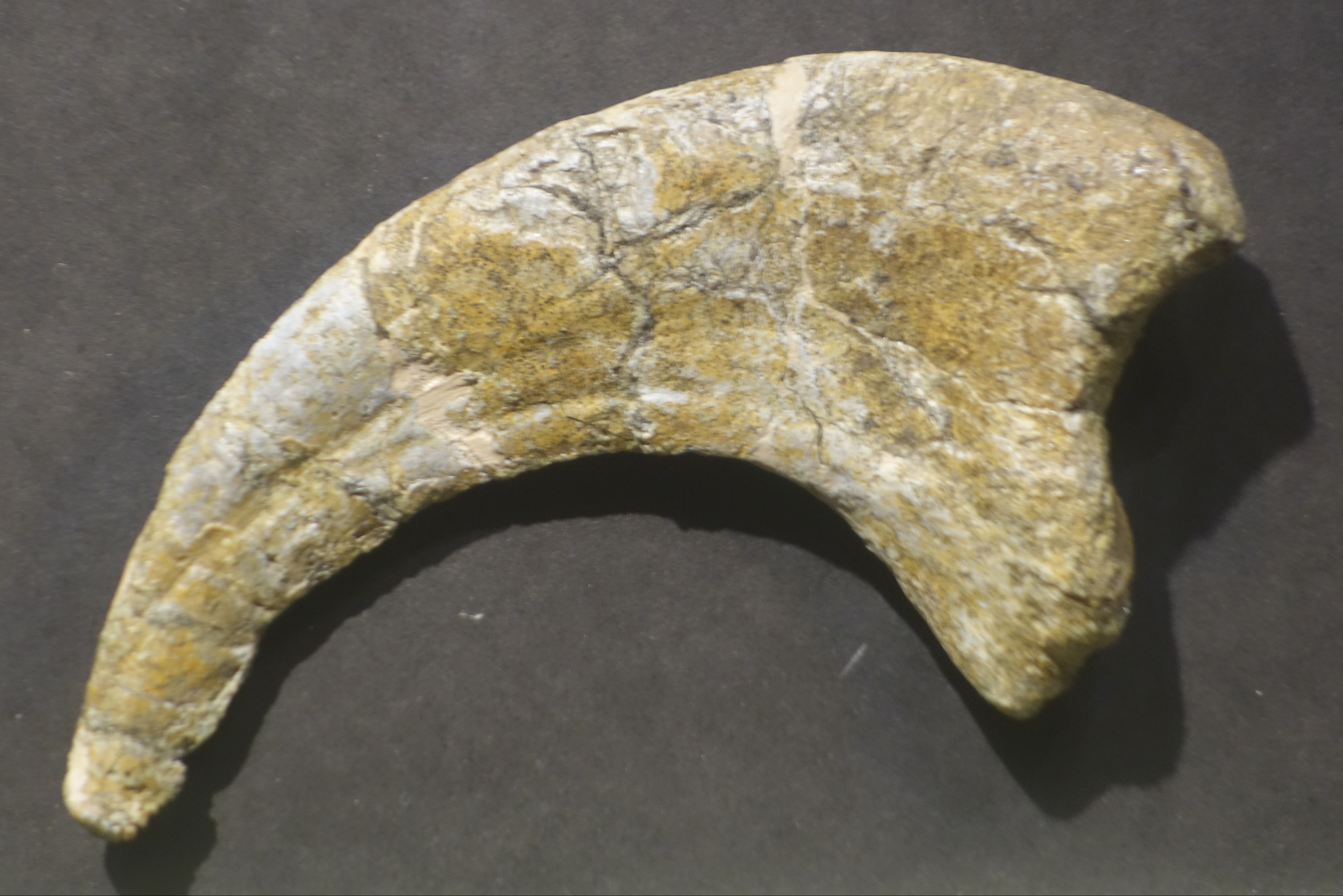
Pedal ungual II of CEUM 184v.294, housed at the Prehistoric Museum, USU Eastern.

In 2000, the specific name was emended by George Olshevsky to the plural genitive ostrommaysorum. However, Thiago Vernaschi V. Costa and Normand David in 2019 criticized the use of the species name U. ostrommaysorum, since it has no clear justification or explanation. Although this spelling has been largely used by other authors, the genus Utahraptor was originally coined with the type species U. ostrommaysi and, given that the International Code of Zoological Nomenclature offers no provision for forming a genitive form for persons with different names, Costa and David conclude that the original spelling ostrommaysi has to be regarded as an arbitrary combination of letters and not a correctly formed genitive form. Under this reasoning, ostrommaysorum has no valid use and the original spelling ostrommaysi does not need to be emended. Other alternative and also invalid spellings were used in scientific literature, such as ostromaysi, ostromaysorum, ostromayssorum, ostromayorum and ostrommaysori.

Some elements were wrongly referred to the genus. The lacrimal bone of the specimen CEUM 184v.83 turned out to be a postorbital from the ankylosaur Gastonia. Britt and colleagues also suggested that the previously identified manual unguals of the specimens M184v.294, BYU 9438 and BYU 13068 are indeed pedal unguals. This suggestion was confirmed by Senter in 2007.

== Description ==
Utahraptor was one of the largest dromaeosaurids, with the largest elements assigned to the genus being slightly larger than the same bones in Achillobator. It was fairly robust compared to other dromaeosaurs, with stocky limbs proportioned more like those of other large theropods than those of its close relatives. Unlike its cousins, U. ostrommaysi had a robust lower jaw with a downturned tip, and as a result, the teeth at the front were quite procumbent. The characteristic "killing claw" of dromaeosaurids may, in U. ostrommaysi, have measured about 24 cm (9.4 in) in length, and its feet appear to have had a very tight grip. Based on evidence of filamentation in other dromaeosaurs, U. ostrommaysi was likely feathered.

=== Size ===
Restoration

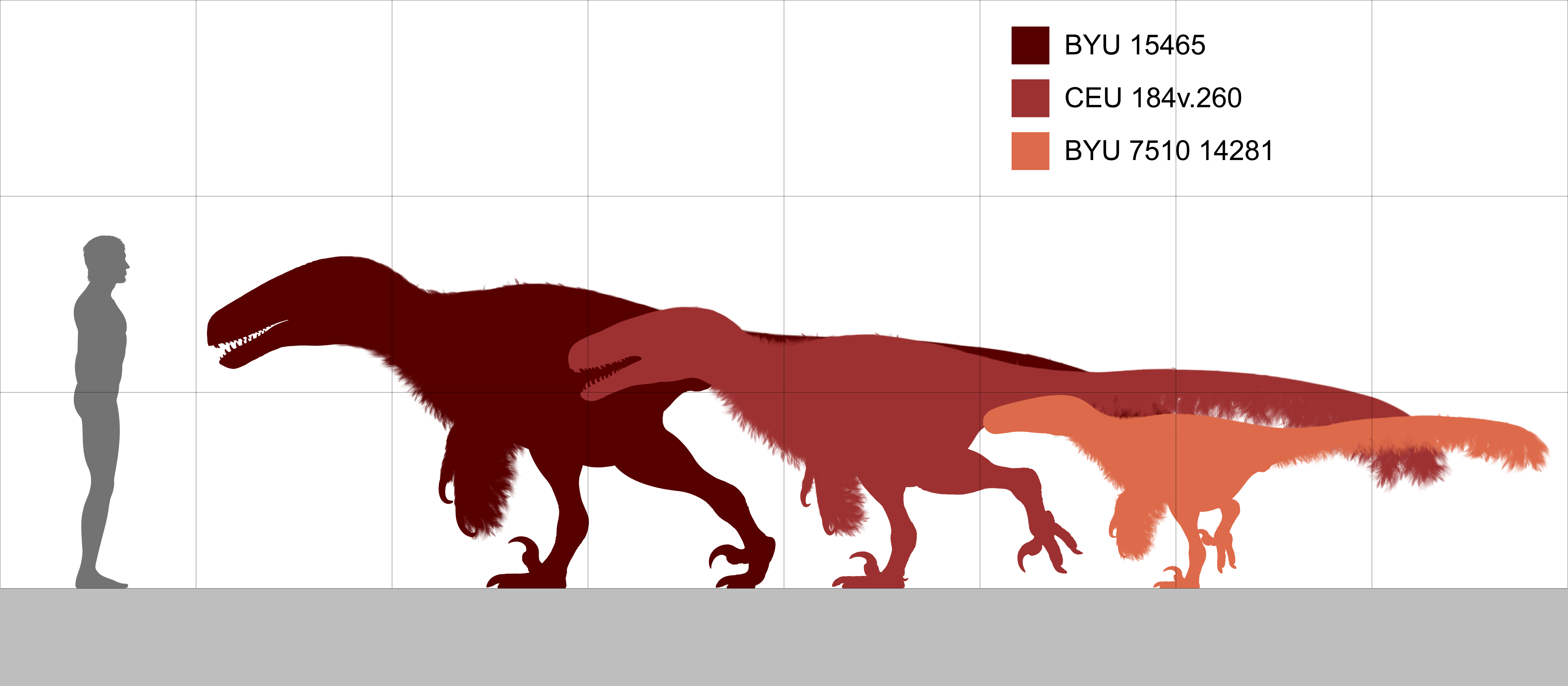
Utahraptor specimens compared in size to a 1.8-meter-tall (5.9-foot) human

Utahraptor was one of, if not the largest and heaviest of all dromaeosaurids, with the largest assigned specimen BYUVP 15465 having a femoral length of 56.5–60 cm (22.2–23.6 in). Kirkland and colleagues originally estimated that it measured around 7 m (23 ft) in length and had a body mass of somewhere under 500 kg (1,100 lb), making it roughly the size of a modern polar bear, and subsequent authors have reported a lower length estimate of 6 m (20 ft). A subsequent paper indicated that U. ostrommaysi was about the same size as Achillobator, and that the latter taxon was around 5 m (16 ft) in length and 350–450 kg (770–990 lb), ergo U. ostrommaysi was the same. Ruben Molina-Pérez and Asier Larramendi, in 2019, estimated that BYUVP 15465 was 4.9 m (16 ft) in length and weighed 280 kg (620 lb). Several mass estimates for U. ostrommaysi have placed it at around 250–350 kg (550–770 lb). In 2013, based on femoral length, Lindsay E. Zanno and Peter J. Makovicky estimated its body mass at around 290 kg (640 lb). In 2024, higher mass estimates were once again recovered by Romain Pintore and colleagues. The body masses of BYUVP 2536 and BYUVP 1833 were estimated around 391 and 481 kg (862 and 1,060 lb), respectively, while BYUVP 7510-18078 was estimated to have weighed 777 kg (1,713 lb).

=== Skull and dentition ===
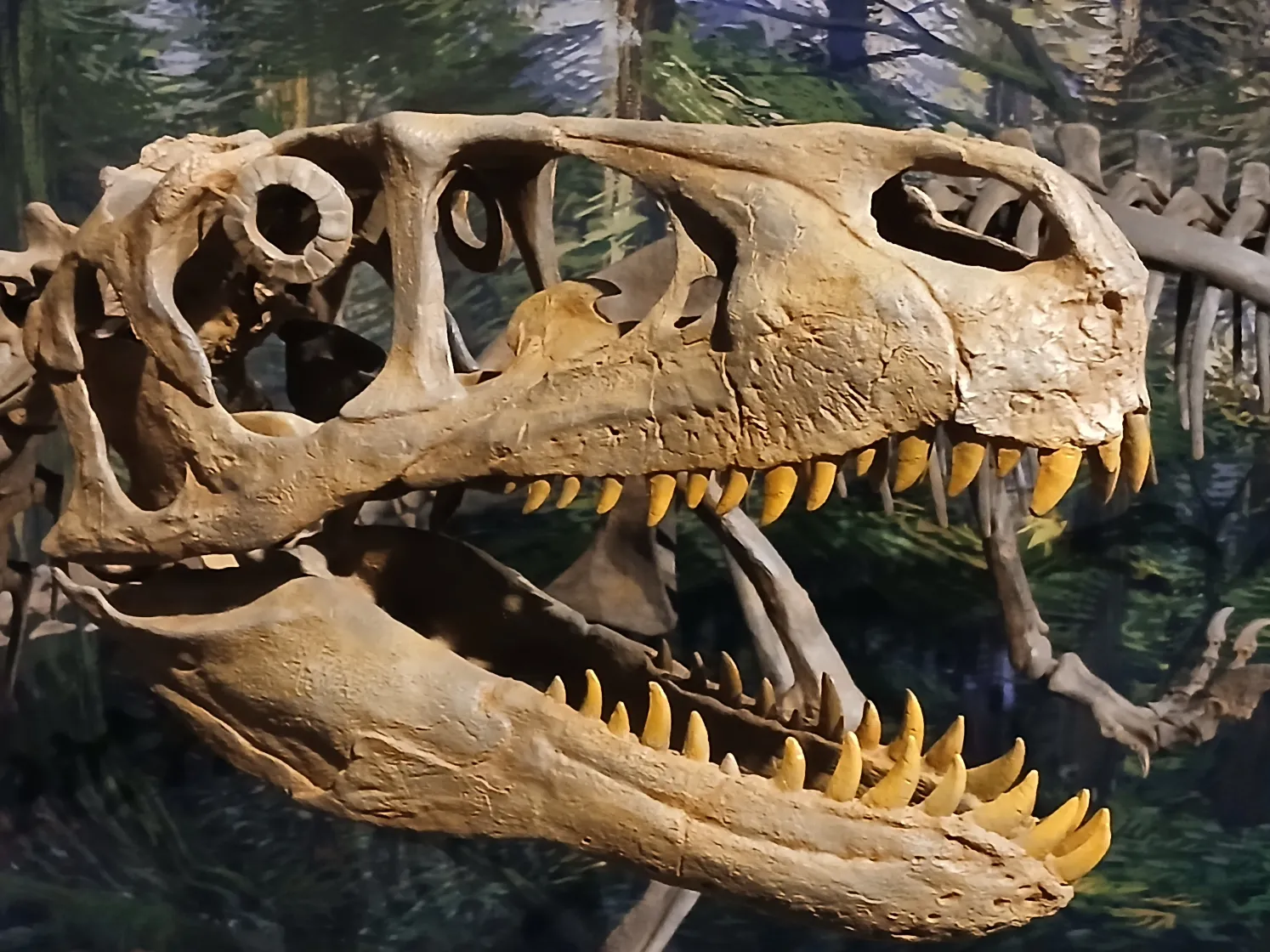
Reconstructed skull at a temporary exhibit at the Fernbank Museum

The skull elements preserved in Utahraptor's holotype consisted of a premaxilla, a lacrimal bone and several teeth. Most of the holotype premaxilla was preserved, aside from the superior nasal process, the part at the top to which the upper part of the nasal bone would have articulated. The nasal process preserved in other specimens is somewhat elongated. According to Kirkland and colleagues in 1993, the premaxilla of U. ostrommaysi was incredibly large compared to that of other dromaeosaurids, perhaps 250% larger than that of Deinonychus. The main body of the bone was essentially square in shape. At the posterior (rear) margin of the naris (nasal opening), the subnarial process flared outward to join with the subnarial process of the nasal bone, and in doing so completely excluded the maxilla from the margins of the naris. The alveolar process or tooth row of the premaxilla was around 75 mm (3 in) in length. Utahraptor's maxilla had a rugose lateral surface covered in ridges and grooves which extended from neurovascular foramina, which would have supplied facial tissues with blood. The quadratojugal bone of U. ostrommaysi was L-shaped and lacked a posterior process. The mandible (lower jaw) of U. ostrommaysi is known from several dentaries (the tooth-bearing portions at the front), recovered from the Utahraptor Block. One such specimen, UMNH VP 20501, comes from an adult specimen. It indicates that the teeth of Utahraptor's lower jaw were fairly procumbent anteriorly, meaning those towards the front would have visibly protruded forwards.

Utahraptor's teeth differed from those of most other dromaeosaurs in that the anterior (front) and posterior denticles were only slightly different in density. They are most similar to those of Achillobator and Dromaeosaurus. Similarly, the counter-clockwise twisting of the dental carinae on the premaxillary teeth is like what is observed in Dromaeosaurus; consequently, these teeth were very asymmetric in cross-section.

=== Postcranial skeleton ===
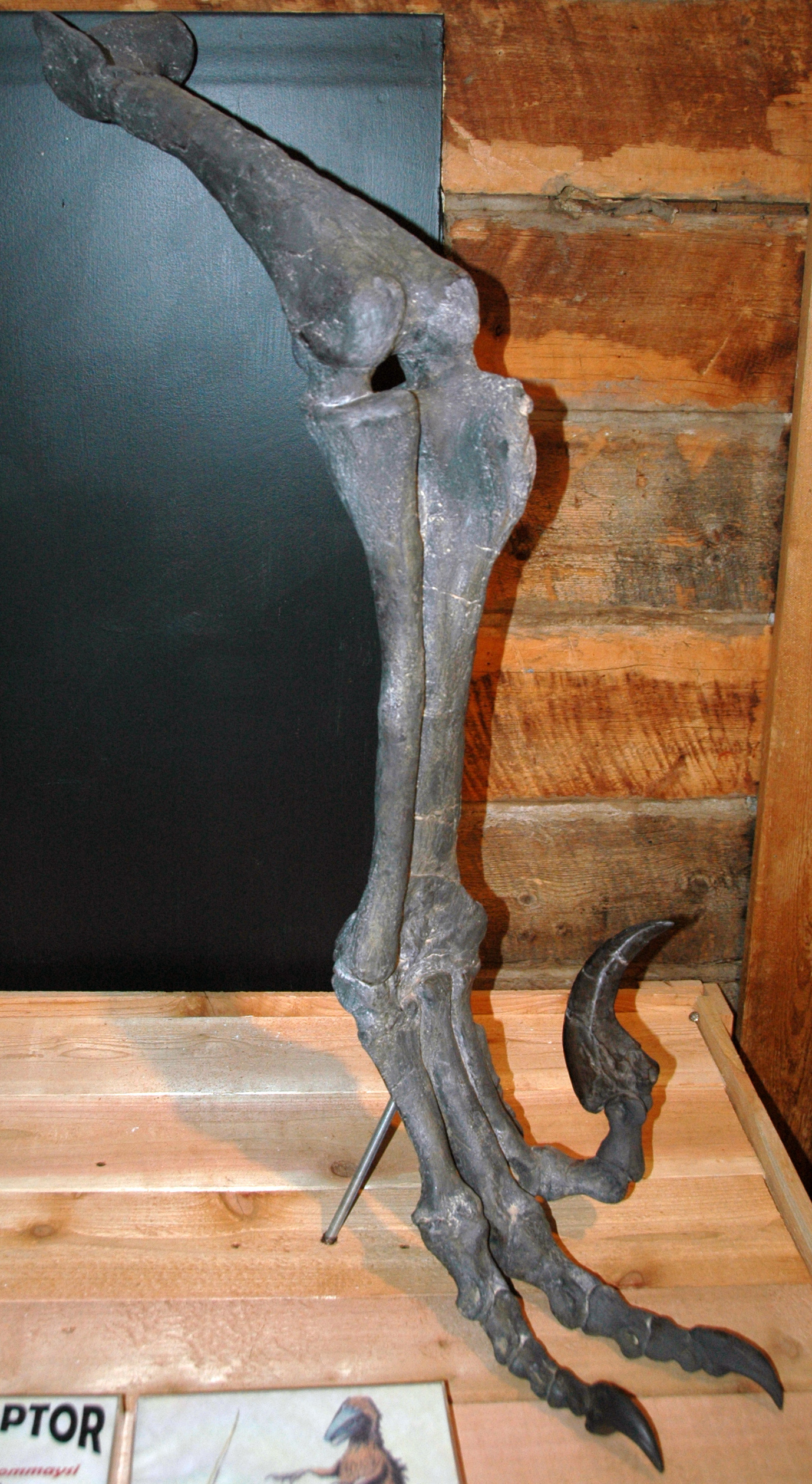
Reconstructed hindlimb of Utahraptor

The dorsal (back) vertebrae of Utahraptor lacked pleurocoels, a series of hollow depressions found in the vertebrae of many dinosaurs which reduced their weight. As in other dromaeosaurs, the parapophyses were mounted on pedicles on each dorsal vertebra. The caudal (tail) vertebrae were similar to those of Deinonychus despite being considerably larger. They are platycoelous, meaning they are flat anteriorly and concave posteriorly. The chevrons and prezygapophyses of U. ostrommaysi's tail appear to have been shortened, which would have increased the tail's overall flexibility in comparison to that of many other dromaeosaurs. The specific condition of Utahraptor's tail vertebrae is dubbed a "hemicaudothecal" condition, and is also seen in Achillobator, suggesting that it may be a prerequisite for the evolution of a very large body size in dromaeosaurids.

The forelimbs of Utahraptor are largely unknown. The manual (hand) unguals, the bones which would have supported the hand claws, were broadly similar to those of other dromaeosaurs, bearing asymmetrical and prominent grooves along their inner and outer edges. However, they were more laterally compressed and were noted to have been more blade-like in construction, leading Kirkland and colleagues to suggest that U. ostrommaysi might have used them to slash at prey.

The femur (the long bone of the upper leg) of the largest-known Utahraptor specimen measured 56.5 cm (22.2 in), about 15 cm larger than that of Achillobator. There was a well-developed notch between the lesser and greater trochanters. What is known of the tibia is stout and has a straight shaft, with a circumference/length index of 40, between that of Ceratosaurus and Torvosaurus. It bore a prominent cnemial crest, twisting towards where the fibula would have sat. Its overall appearance was noted by Kirkland and colleagues to be somewhat reminiscent of Acrocanthosaurus, and in personal communications with the authors, Robert T. Bakker noted a further similarity in that the tibia may have been about as long as the femur, as in large non-dromaeosaur theropods. Like other dromaeosaurids, Utahraptor had a large curved claw on the second toe of each foot. The second pedal ungual, the bone on the second toe which would have supported this claw, is preserved in the holotype with a 22 cm (8.7 in) length when measured along its outside curve, and is estimated to have measured 24 cm (9.4 in) in total. The size of the flexor tubercles on U. ostrommaysi's pedal digits, to which digital flexors would have attached in life, suggests that it had a strong grip, perhaps more so than Deinonychus (which had smaller flexor tubercles) in proportion to body size.

== Classification ==
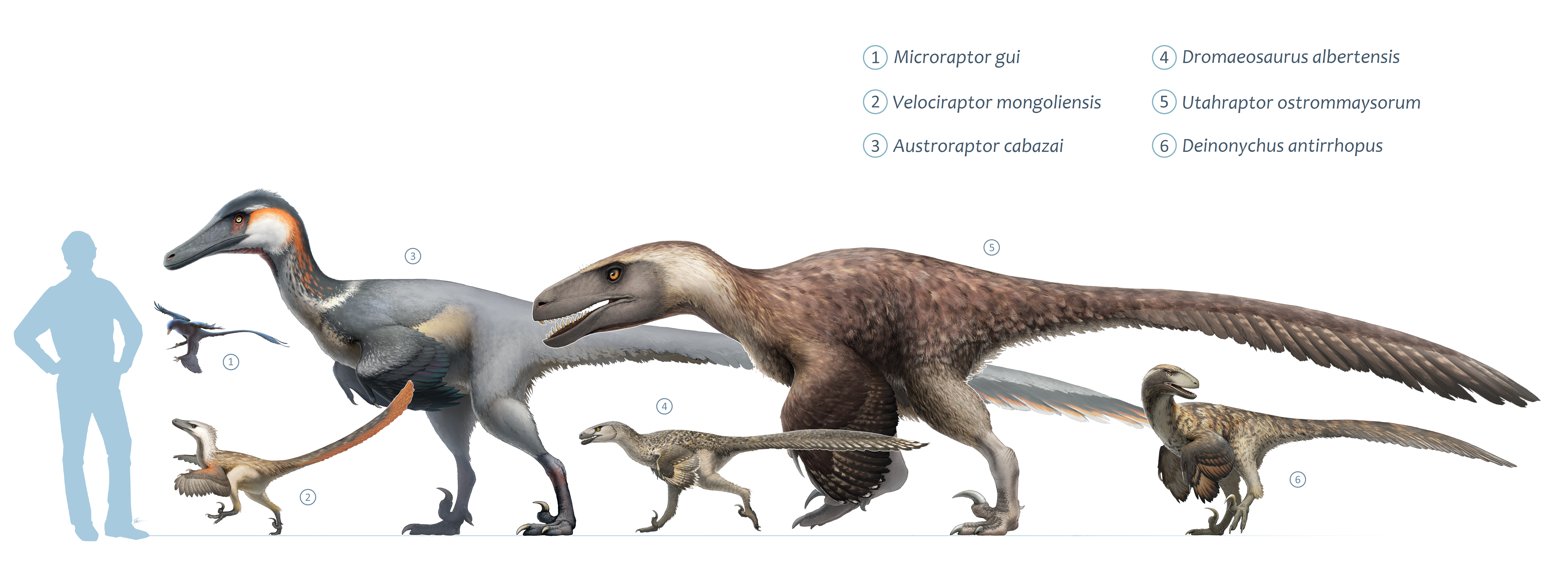
Size of Utahraptor (5) compared with other dromaeosaurs

Utahraptor is a member of the family Dromaeosauridae, a clade of theropod dinosaurs commonly known as the "raptors". The dromaeosaurids also include other well-known genera, such as Deinonychus, Dromaeosaurus and Velociraptor. Utahraptor is one of the largest, if not the largest-known representative of the family. In their initial description of the genus, James Kirkland and colleagues placed Utahraptor within the subfamily Dromaeosaurinae, now part of the clade Eudromaeosauria. Subsequent analyses have largely maintained this position, with some exceptions.

In a 2015 analysis from the paper describing the likely-chimaeric (Note: a fossil that was reconstructed with elements coming from more than a single species or genus of animal.) Dakotaraptor steini, Utahraptor was found to be closely related to the smaller Dromaeosaurus and the giant Mongolian and North American dromaeosaurid genera Achillobator and Dakotaraptor:

- Eudromaeosauria
  - Saurornitholestes
  - - Velociraptor
    - Dromaeosaurinae
      - Deinonychus
      - - Atrociraptor
        - - Achillobator
          - - Utahraptor
            - - Dakotaraptor
              - Dromaeosaurus

The cladogram below is the result of a phylogenetic analysis conducted by Cau and colleagues in 2017.

- Eudromaeosauria
  - Bambiraptor
  - - Tianyuraptor
    - - Dromaeosaurinae
        - Achillobator
        - - Utahraptor
          - Dromaeosaurus
      - Velociraptorinae
        - Adasaurus
        - - - Deinonychus
            - Saurornitholestes
          - - Velociraptor
            - - Tsaagan
              - Linheraptor

Utahraptor has been recovered in several positions outside of Dromaeosaurinae. An analysis in 2019 by Mickey Mortimer and colleagues recovered Achillobator, Deinonychus, Utahraptor and Yixiansaurus in a clade potentially outside of Dromaeosaurinae, though noted that it could be moved to either Dromaeosaurinae or Velociraptorinae in only two steps. The following year, the paper describing Dineobellator notohesperus recovered a topology wherein Achillobator and Utahraptor nested together at the base of a group which otherwise includes Velociraptorinae.

== Paleobiology ==
=== Predatory behavior ===
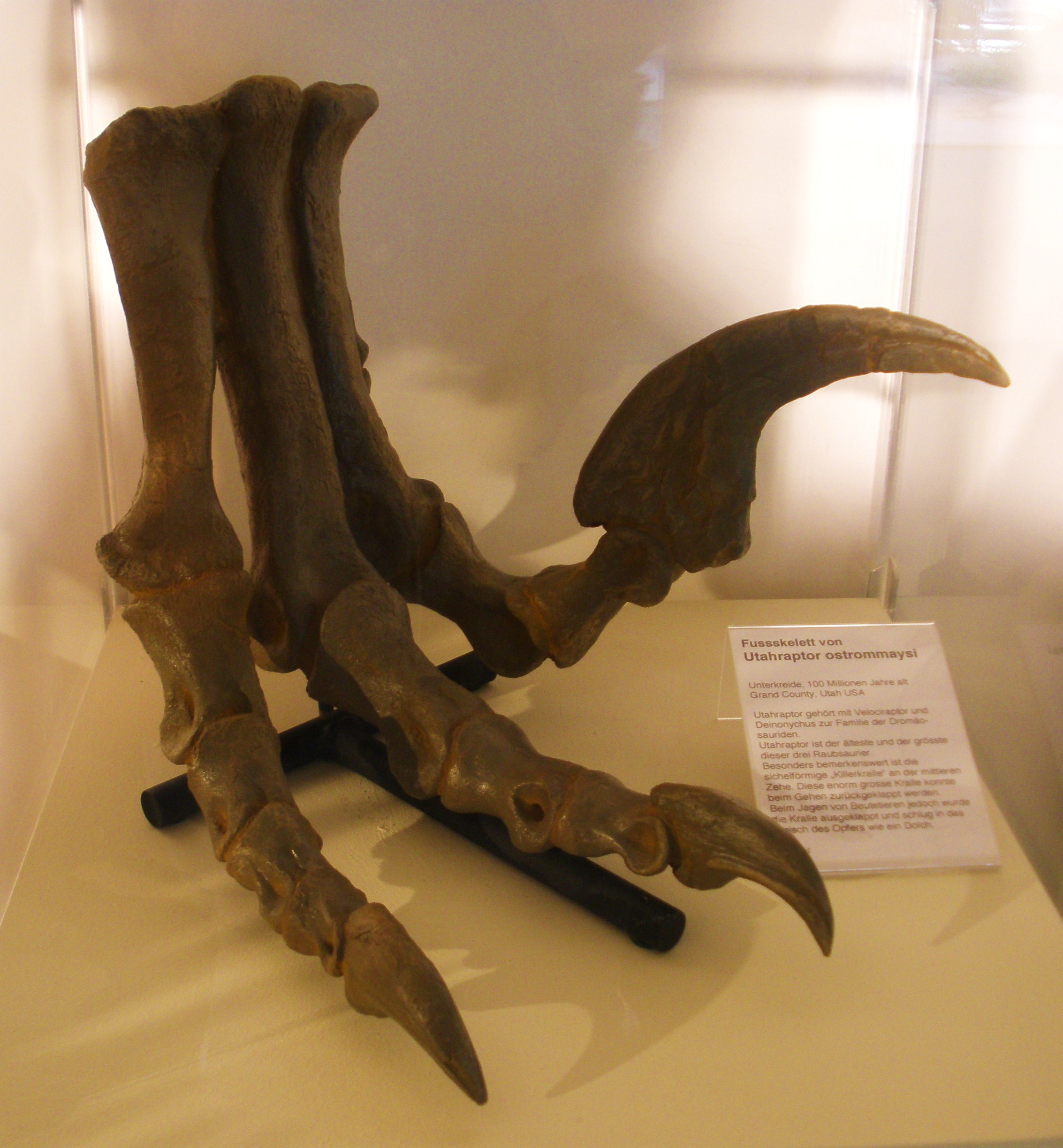
Cast of the foot bones, Dinosaur Museum Aathal

Kirkland and colleagues noted that given the large size of Utahraptor, it was not as fast as Deinonychus and Velociraptor; instead, it would have had a similar speed to the contemporary iguanodonts, though would have been faster than sauropods. Additionally, the thickness of the tibia indicates that the animal possessed a significant leg force in order to kill prey. It was also suggested that lighter dromaeosaurids such as Velociraptor and Deinonychus relied on their hand claws to handle prey and retain balance while kicking it; in contrast to this, the heavily built Utahraptor may have been able to deliver kicks without the risk of losing balance, freeing the hands and using them to dispatch prey.

According to Gregory S. Paul, Utahraptor was not particularly fast and would have been an ambush hunter that preyed on large dinosaurs such as the contemporary iguanodonts and therizinosaurs. Its robust build and large sickle claw indicate it was well suited to hunting such prey. Like other dromaeosaurine dromaeosaurids, it may have also relied heavily on its jaws to dispatch prey, more so than other types of dromaeosaurids, such as velociraptorines.

=== Social behavior ===
In 2001, Kirkland and colleagues pursued a graduate student's discovery of a bone protruding from a nine-ton fossil block of sandstone in eastern Utah. It was determined to contain the bones of at least seven individuals, including an adult measuring about 4.8 m (16 ft), four juveniles and a hatchling about 1 m (3.3 ft) long. Also fossilized with the Utahraptor pack are the remains of at least one possible iguanodont. Kirkland speculated that the Utahraptor pack attempted to scavenge carrion or attack helpless prey mired in quicksand, and were themselves mired in the attempt to feed on the herbivore. Similar sites such as the Cleveland-Lloyd Quarry and California's La Brea Tar Pits house such predator traps. Examination of the fossils are ongoing after a decade of excavation, but if Kirkland is correct, it may be one of the best-preserved predator traps ever discovered. The fossils may further reveal aspects into the behavior of Utahraptor, such as whether it might have hunted in groups like Deinonychus was believed to have done. Whether all the Utahraptor individuals were mired simultaneously or were drawn in, one-by-one is unclear. Further examination of the block suggests that the number of Utahraptor remains may be double the amount previously assumed.

While dinosaur behavior can only be theorized, it was later discovered in 2020 that Deinonychus may not have practiced mammal-like pack hunting, based on differing dietary preferences in adults and juveniles. (Note: Mammalian pack-hunting in the context of this study refers exclusively to wolf packs; other gregarious carnivores, such as lions, spotted hyenas, and dholes, have differently structured packs) Despite this, the authors stated that gregariousness was still possible for Deinonychus due to the lack of spatial separation between adults and juveniles. Additionally, the discovery of Utahraptor in the mud-trap implies it exhibited a degree of post-nestling care and gregariousness.

== Paleoenvironment ==
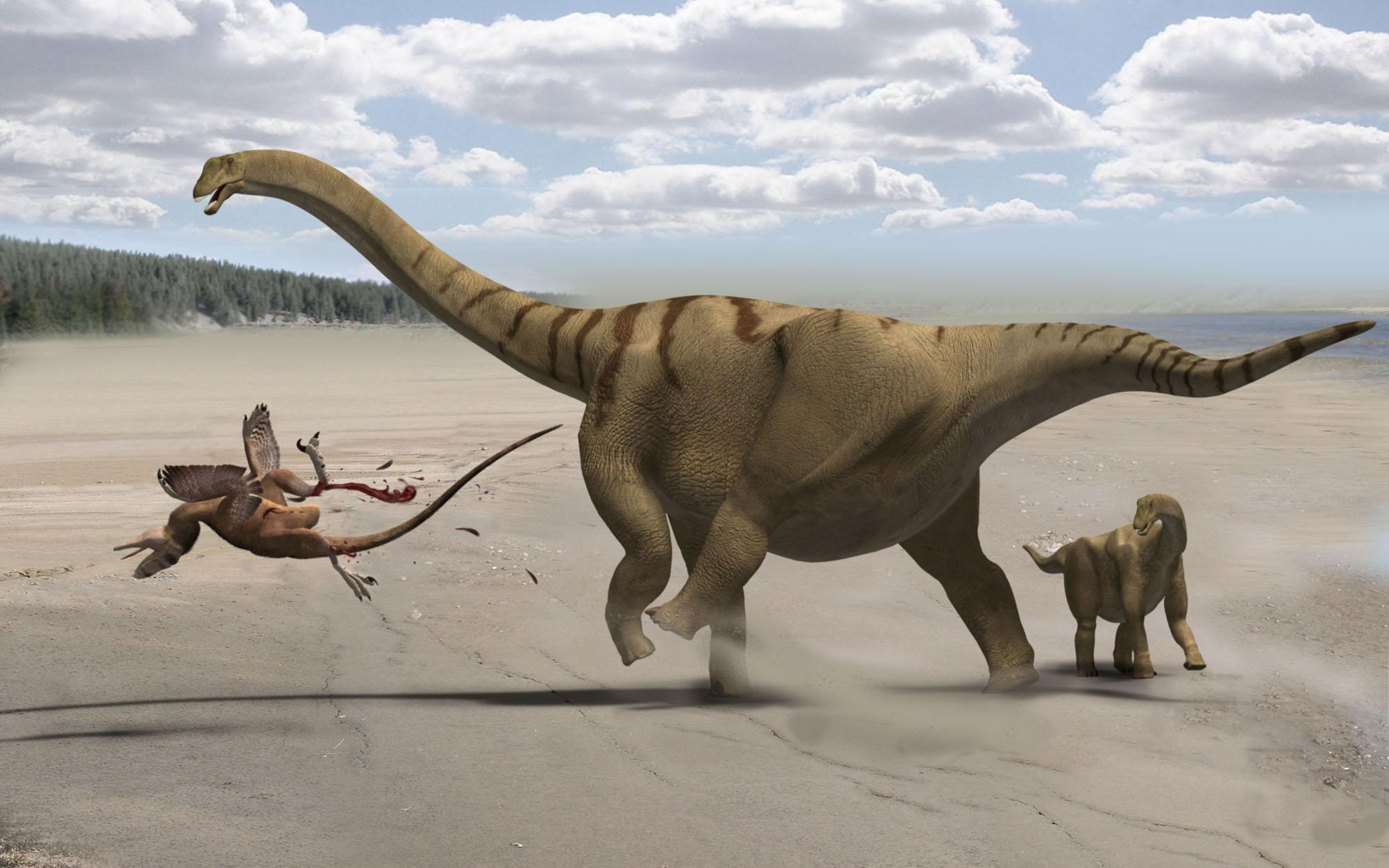
Reconstruction of Brontomerus using its strong femoral protraction muscles to deliver a kick to a Utahraptor

Utahraptor lived in the lower part of the Cedar Mountain Formation, a bed known as the Yellow Cat Member. According to the authors of its description, Utahraptor had an important ecological role as a major carnivore of the paleofauna of the present-day Arches region during the Early Cretaceous, and could probably attack prey larger than itself. Group hunting of individuals of at least 3.5 m (11 ft) and 70 kg (150 lb), if proven, could have killed 8 m (26 ft) prey of a weight of 1 to 2 t (0.98 to 2.0 long tons; 1.1 to 2.2 short tons). Additionally, sauropods ranging around 20 m (66 ft) may have been an important part of its diet. The paleontologist Thomas R. Holtz estimated that Utahraptor existed between 130 million and 125 million years ago. In multiple occasions, the Yellow Cat Member has been dated to Barremian–Aptian ages. Sames and Schudack, in 2010, proposed a reassignment of the estimated age, compromising Berriasian to Valanginian stages; however, this interpretation was not followed by most authors. Using advanced methods of radiometric and palynological dating, Joeckel and colleagues (2019) concluded that the Yellow Cat Member is indeed older than previous estimations. The deposition occurred between 139 ± 1.3 million to 134.6 ± 1.7 million years ago, or, Berriasian to Late Valanginian stages. Based on the presence of new palynoflora, Middle Berriasian–Early Hauterivian ages were provisionally assigned. However, the Yellow Cat Member is divided into distinct "lower" and "upper" layers, and Utahraptor fossils are only currently known within the upper Yellow Cat Member.

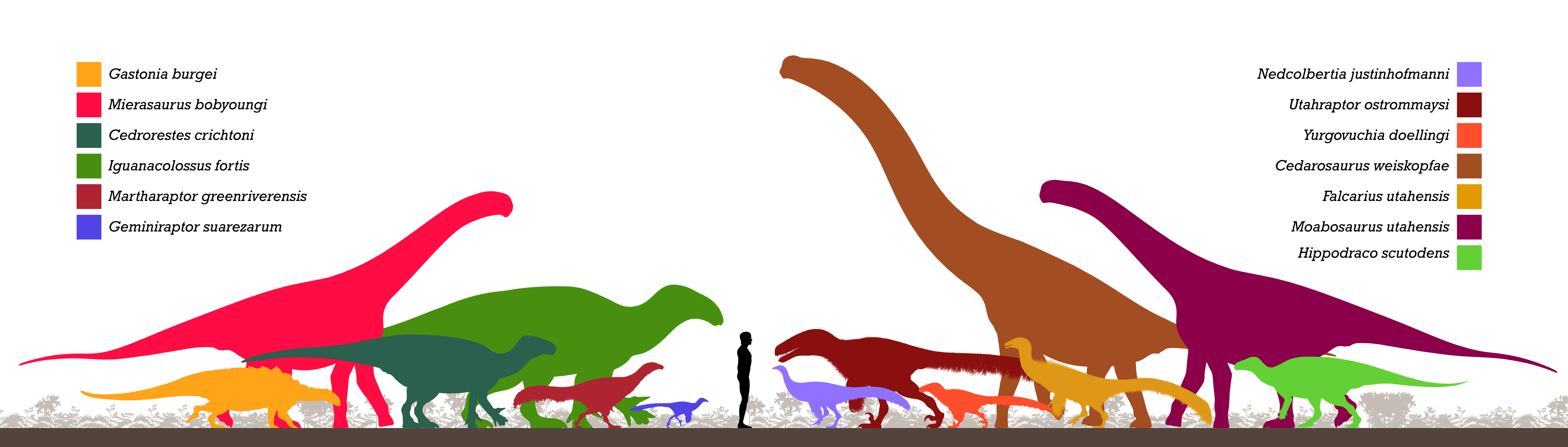
Utahraptor (red, right) and other dinosaur fauna from the Cedar Mountain Formation

Utahraptor was unearthed from the Yellow Cat Member, which during the Berriasian to Late Valanginian was a semiarid area with floodplain prairies, riverine forests and open woodlands predominated by conifers (Pinophyta), ferns (Polypodiopsida), hornworts (Anthocerotophyta) and other vascular plants. During the description of Mierasaurus, it was interpreted that there was also a waterlogged bog-like environment. There is believed to have been a short wet season. This is supported by the presence of charred spores and other carbonized plant debris in the pollen maceral that indicate the occurrence of ancient wildfires ignited during periods of low precipitation.

Paleofauna that were contemporaneous with the dromaeosaurid in the upper Yellow Cat Member included numerous dinosaurs, such as the medium-sized iguanodonts Hippodraco and Cedrorestes, the smaller theropods Martharaptor and Nedcolbertia, the nodosaurid Gastonia, and the sauropods Cedarosaurus and Moabosaurus. The only known mammal from the Upper Yellow Cat Member is Cifelliodon.

Other non-dinosaur or avian taxa known from the Member include the fish Ceratodus and Semionotus, the turtles Glyptops and Trinitichelys, Aquatilavipes (fossilized bird tracks), the rhynchocephalian Toxolophosaurus, and the indeterminate remains of hybodontid and polyacrodontid sharks.

Additional paleofauna was recovered, most of it being unnamed and/or indeterminate, including an isolated mesoeucrocodylian skull that measures 20 cm (7.9 in) in length. A neochoristodere unearthed from the Upper Yellow Cat Member, represented by a partial left femur, shows that aquatic paleofauna was present and diverse during the Early Cretaceous of the Cedar Mountain Formation. A large sail-backed iguanodont represented by large vertebrae and fragmentary remains, an indeterminate eudromaeosaur known from a caudal vertebra and fragmented tail (UMNH VP 20209) were also present, and at least one allosauroid known from teeth, which would have shared the niche of apex predator with Utahraptor. In areas where they cohabited, the allosauroid was likely dominant, with their relationship possibly being analogous to bears and wolves in modern ecosystems.

== Cultural significance ==
Raptor Red was published in 1995, and features the fictionalized story of a female Utahraptor. Written by paleontologist Robert T. Bakker, it was positively regarded by mainstream reviewers, though updates to the science have rendered some of the story line facts presented untrue and the paleontology community was critical of fossil record inaccuracies. Bakker's anthropomorphosis of the titular Red was particularly praised.

In 2018, it was proposed by a 10-year-old elementary school student, Kenyon Roberts, that Utahraptor be the Utah state dinosaur, an act that was approved by the Senate. Initially Utahraptor would have replaced another dinosaur, Allosaurus, as the state's official fossil, but it was decided that Utahraptor would be another symbol of the state. In 2021, Steve Eliason successfully created a proposal for Utahraptor State Park where the block was discovered, proposed by the same Utah student, Kenyon Roberts. It was approved by the state House. On May 23, 2025, the Visitor Center of Utahraptor State Park was officially opened to the public, displaying the skeleton of a Utahraptor alongside other Dalton Wells dinosaur species.

== See also ==
- Timeline of dromaeosaurid research
