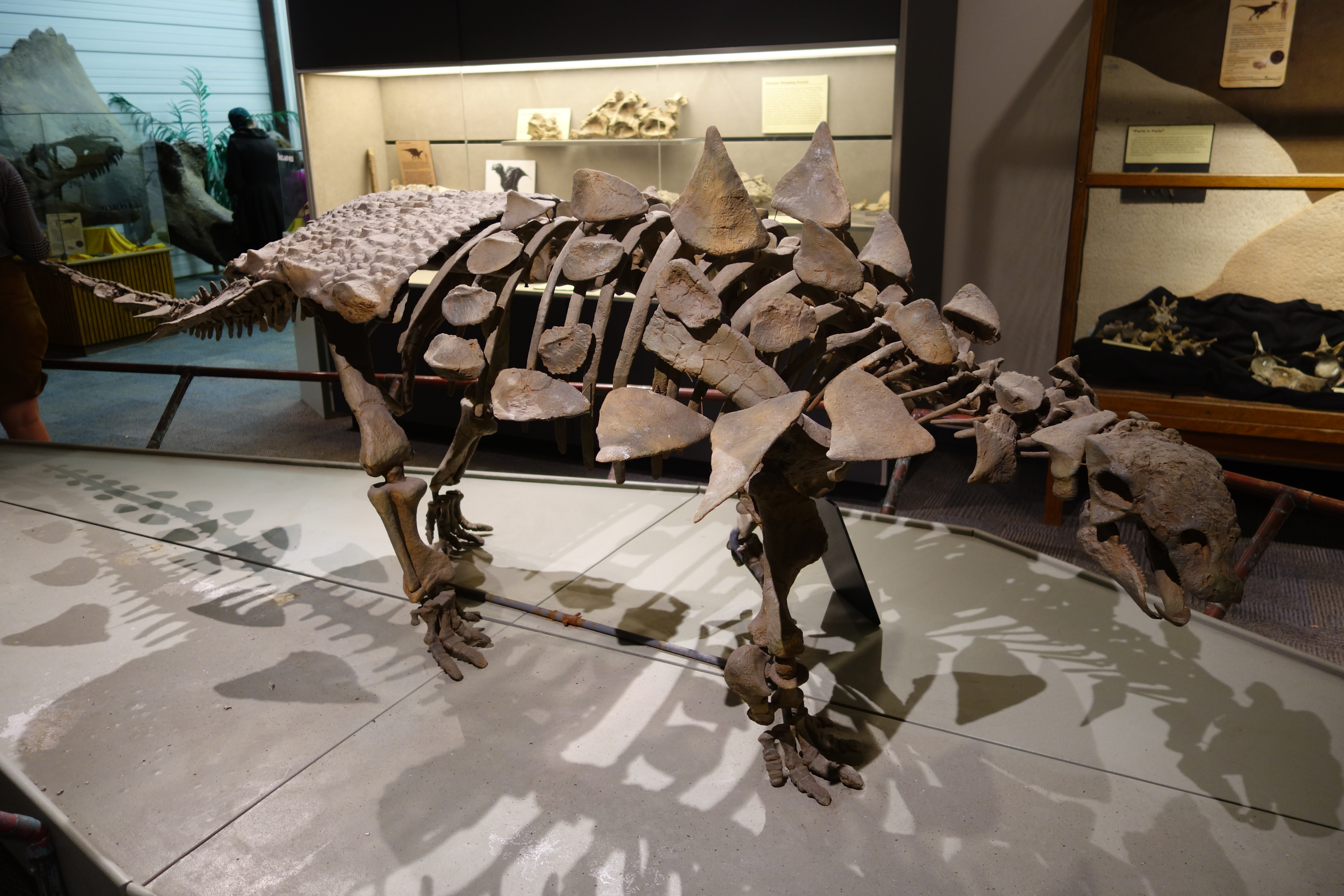
- Reconstructed skeleton of G. burgei, BYU Museum of Paleontology

Scientific classification
- Kingdom: Animalia
- Phylum: Chordata
- Class: Reptilia
- Clade: Dinosauria
- Clade: †Ornithischia
- Clade: †Thyreophora
- Clade: †Ankylosauria
- Family: †Nodosauridae
- Subfamily: †Polacanthinae
- Genus: †Gastonia; Kirkland, 1998

Type species
- †Gastonia burgei Kirkland, 1998

Species
- †G. burgei Kirkland, 1998; †G. lorriemcwhinneyae Kinneer et al., 2016

= Gastonia (dinosaur) =

Gastonia Temporal range: Early Cretaceous, 139–125.77 Ma

Ankylosaurian dinosaur genus from the Early Cretaceous period

Gastonia is a genus of herbivorous ankylosaurian dinosaur from the Early Cretaceous of North America, around 139 to 125.77 million years ago. It is often considered a nodosaurid closely related to Polacanthus. Gastonia has a sacral shield and large shoulder spikes.

== Discovery and species ==
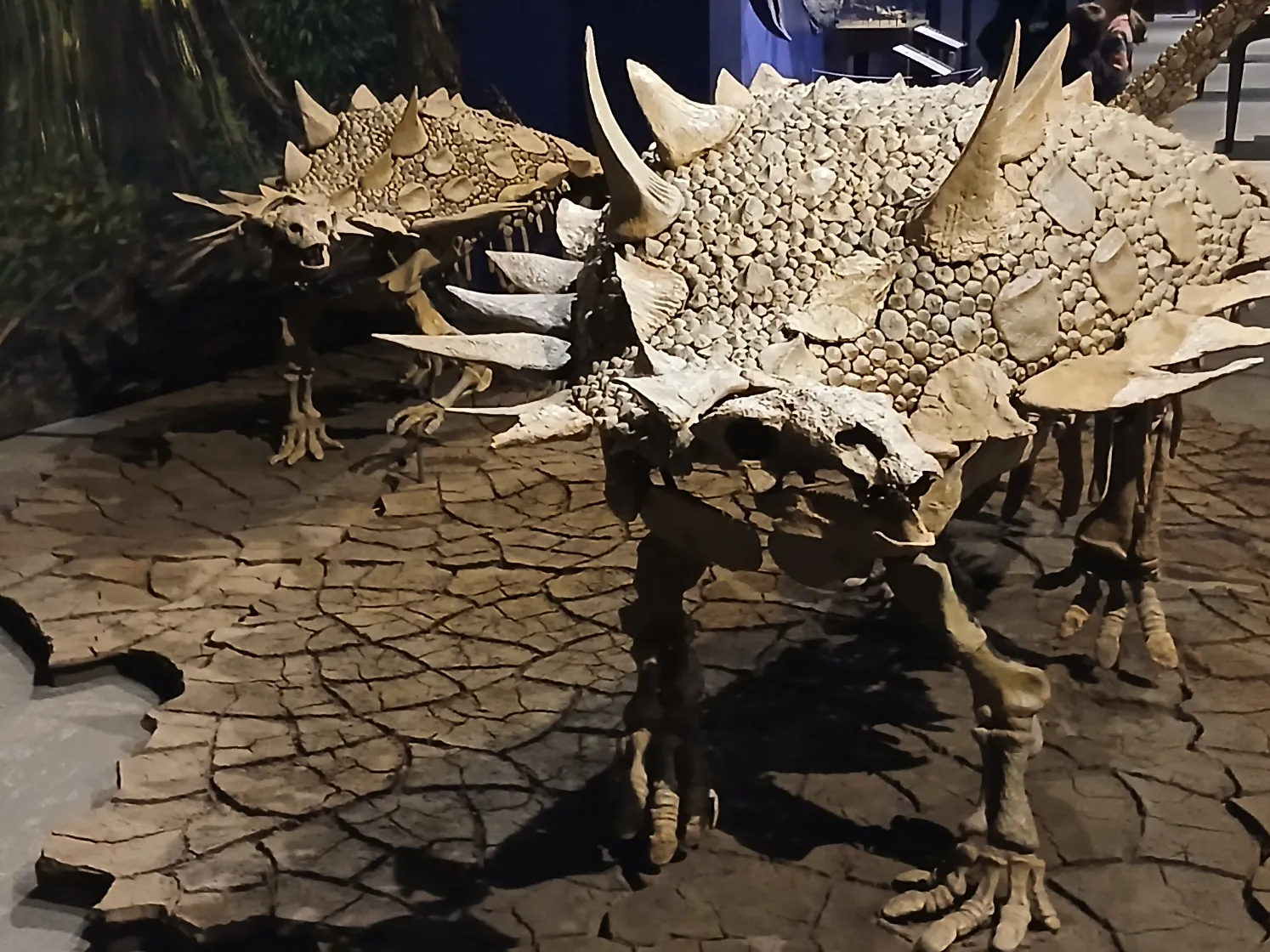
A pair of Gastonia as viewed from the front, showing the prominent osteoderms

The type specimen of Gastonia burgei (CEUM 1307) was discovered in a bonebed from the limestone strata of the lower Cedar Mountain Formation in Yellow Cat Quarry, Grand County, eastern Utah, the type specimen consisting of a single skull. The type specimen was found alongside 4 partial skeletons of Gastonia that were placed as paratypes, along with the type specimen of Utahraptor and an iguanodontid. Gastonia is among the most common dinosaur fossils in the Cedar Mountain Formation, with many individuals being found across several quarries in the southwest. In 2004, the number of skulls was reported as four, in 2014 this had risen to ten. Gastonia was formally named and described by James Kirkland in 1998, from the holotype specimen and other fossil material recovered beginning in 1989. The name Gastonia honors US paleo artist and CEO of Gaston Design Inc. Robert Gaston. The species G. burgei was named for the director of the College of Eastern Utah Prehistoric Museum, Donald L. Burge.

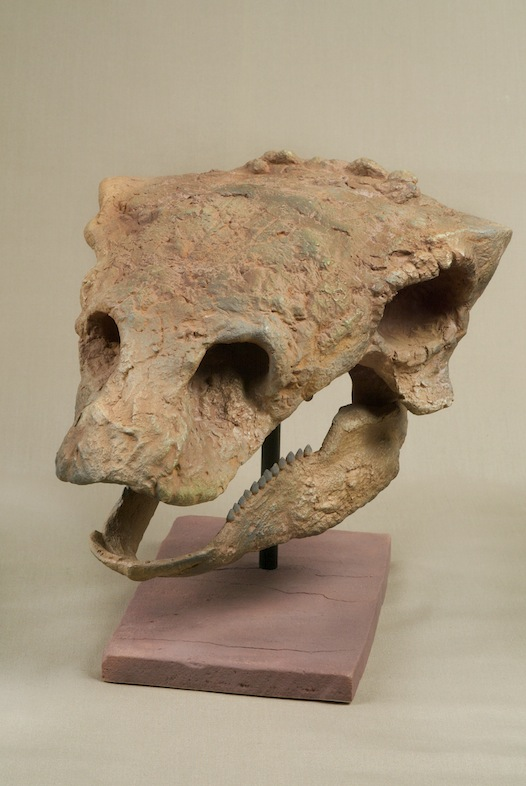
The notch in the upper beak is one of the distinguishing features of Gastonia

Gastonia burgei, was found in rocks of the Cedar Mountain Formation's Yellow Cat Member, which has been dated to the Valanginian, 139 to 134.6 million years ago.

A second species, G. lorriemcwhinneyae, was described from the same formation in 2016 based on a large bonebed that had been found by Lorrie McWhinney in 1999, probably formed when a group died of drought or drowning. The incomplete type specimen (skull roof) and its paratypes based on many other portions of the skeleton were collected by the Denver Museum of Nature and Science from Lorrie's Site in Grand County, Utah. Although the type locality of this species was originally reported as the lower Ruby Ranch Member, it was later corrected to be the older Poison Strip Member (Hauterivian-Barremian).

All together, more complete material exists for Gastonia than for any other basal ankylosaur. A wealth of disarticulated material from a bonebed presents problems as it can be hard to tell how many spikes a particular Gastonia actually had.

In the late twentieth century a skeleton was mounted made of polyurethane casts of skeletal elements of various individuals. Distortions in the fossils were corrected and missing elements completed. This made Gastonia the first basal ankylosaurian dinosaur to have been mounted for display at the Denver Museum of Nature and Science, together with the related Gargoyleosaurus.

== Description ==
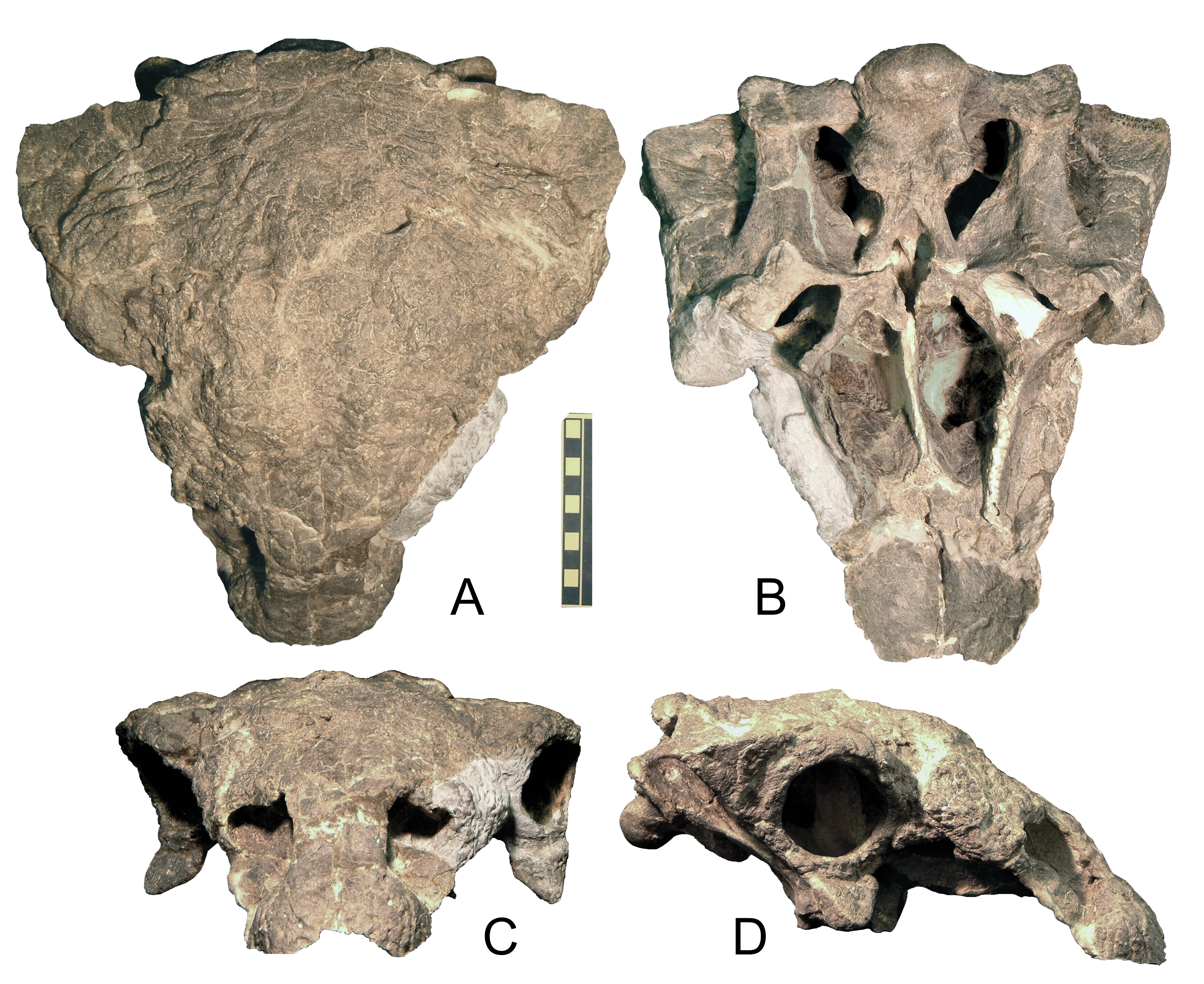
Gastonia burgei holotype skull (CEUM 1307) in (A) top (dorsal), (B) bottom (ventral), (C) front (anterior), and (D) right side (lateral) views. Scale bar = 10 cm

Size comparison

Gastonia was a medium-sized ankylosaur. In 1998, Kirkland estimated its length at 6 m (20 ft). In 2010, Gregory S. Paul indicated a body length of 5 m (16 ft) and a weight of 1.9 t (4,200 lb). The skeleton mount has a length of 4.59 m (15.1 ft) with a hip height of 1.12 m (3.7 ft).

It is difficult to determine distinguishing traits of Gastonia because its affinities are uncertain. However, in 1998 Kirkland established three characters which were unique for the Ankylosauria as a whole and thus likely autapomorphies, unique derived traits. On the midline of the front snout, the bony core of the upper horny beak, a broad, gradually curved, notch is present between the snout bones, the praemaxillae. The bony nostrils are placed far to the rear. At the underside of the braincase, the basisphenoid, the basipterygoid processes are longitudinally stretched.

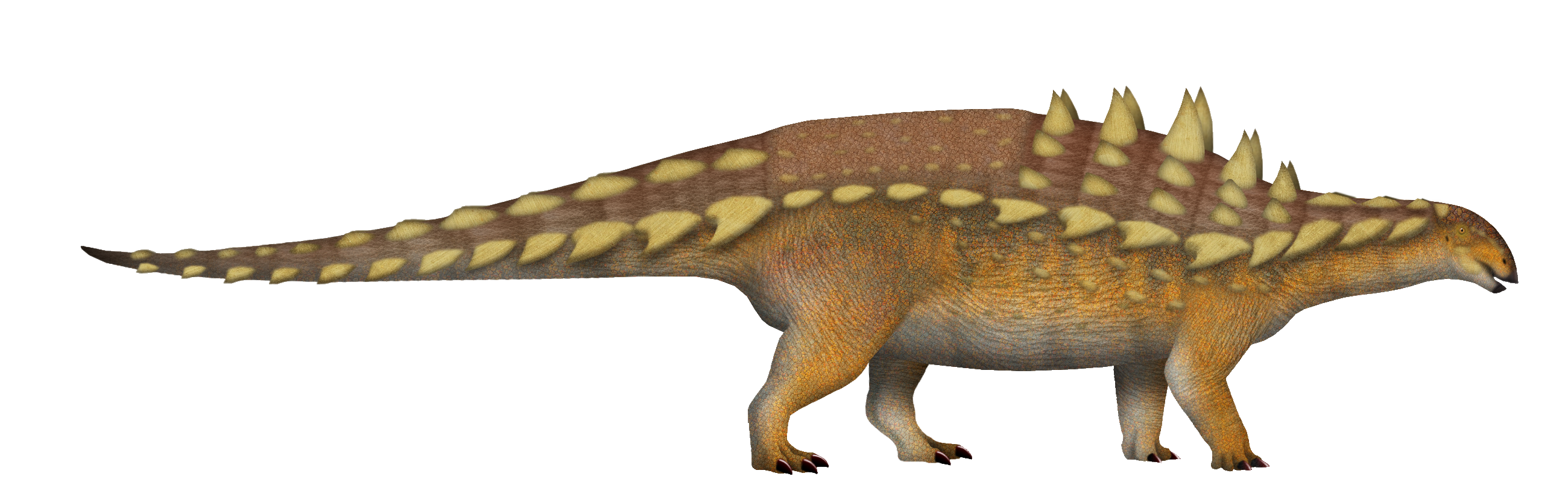
Hypothetical life restoration of Gastonia

Gastonia had a flat and, even for an ankylosaurian, very broad rump, the belly strongly protruding between the short powerful limbs. The tail was moderately long and lacked a tail club. The neck was relatively long and the skull probably rather small.

The skull is somewhat elongated and pointy, measuring 295 by 283 millimetres in the holotype. The top profile of the skull is convex, the rear skull roof curving below the level of the upper rim of the eye sockets. The quadrate is very strongly inclined to the rear. The occipital condyle, the contact with the neck, is obliquely pointing to below, an ankylosaurid trait causing the head to be pointing downwards. The beak is toothless. The tooth rows of the maxillae are rather straight and each consist of fifteen to sixteen small teeth, lacking a true cingulum, swollen basis. There is no armour on the snout. More to the rear the bony tiles of the skull roof, the caputegulae, are rather indistinctively patterned though a small central plate on the parietal bones is visible. The squamosal horns, at the rear skull corners, and jugal horns, at the cheeks, are small.

The sacrum consists of three sacral vertebrae, with a caudo-sacral vertebra behind them. Stiffened rear tail vertebrae or a tail club are absent. The shoulder blade resembles that of nodosaurids in possessing an acromion that is blade-like, but differs in the acromion originating from the front edge, not the outer side of the scapula, not being wrapped to behind and not ending in a knob. It is thus not a typical nodosaurid "pseudoacromion". The coracoid is square in form, a typical ankylosaurid trait. The humerus has a large deltopectoral crest extending downwards to the middle of the shaft, a derived trait. The ulna is very robust with an enormous olecranon. The shinbone is very expanded at both the upper and lower end.

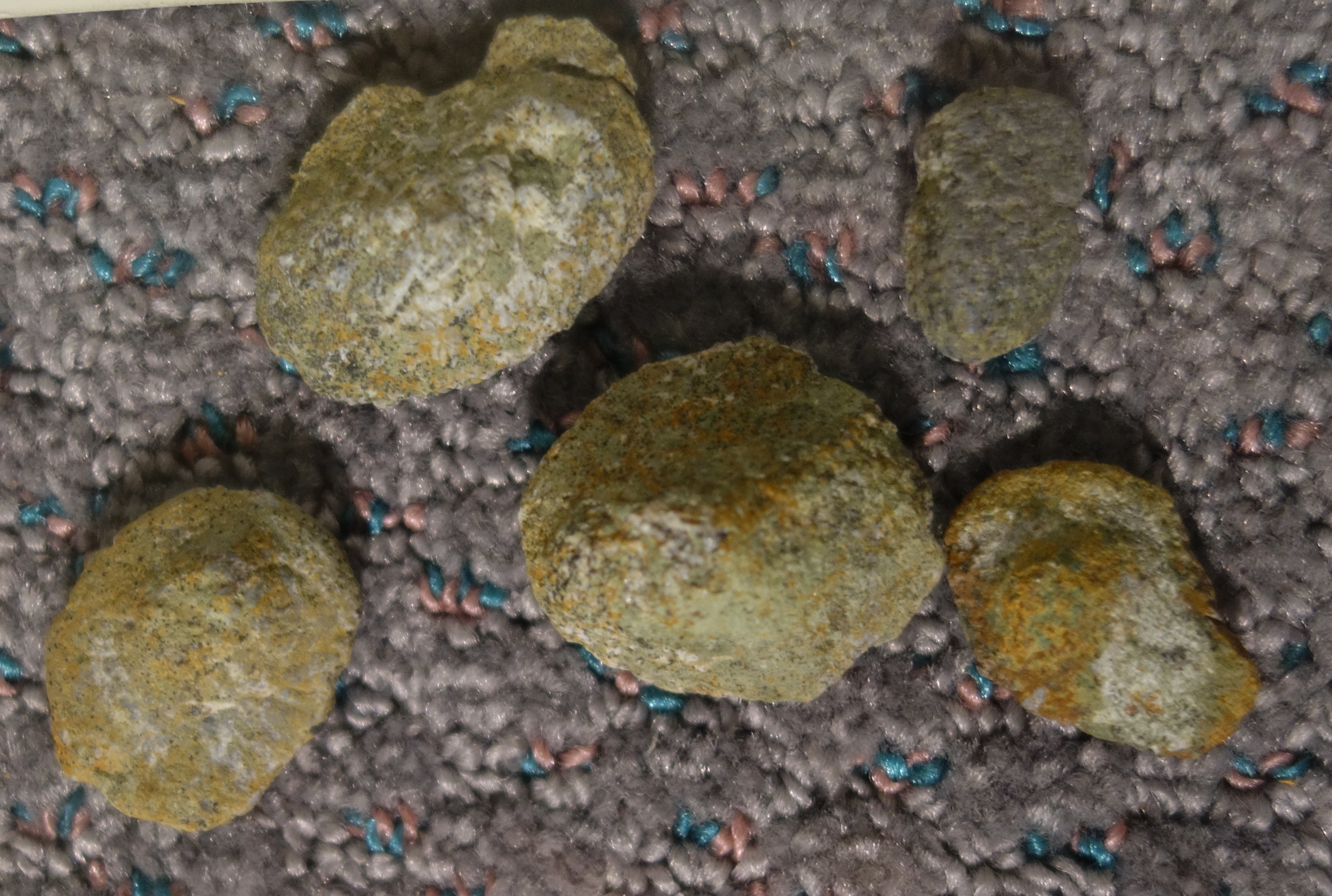
Osteoderms

Gastonia was protected by osteoderms, skin ossifications. The neck was covered by at least two bone rings. Usually in ankylosaurs these have the form of "halfrings" leaving the underside unprotected, but with Gastonia only two segments seem present, one at each side of the midline, causing Kirkland to refer to them as "quarter rings". Each segment had a pointed keel and a hollow underside. Kirkland stressed that the rump armour was hard to reconstruct because it had not been found in articulation. The sides of the thorax seem to have been covered by about five pairs of large flat triangular spikes. They are recurved and have a deep groove in the rear side. They gradually decline in length to behind, the groove becoming relatively shorter and the base length increasing. According to Kirkland the function of the groove was to receive the front edge of the next spike. Other large flat spikes found, lacked the groove. They were often very curved, the point at a right angle with the base. Kirkland assumed these formed two vertical rows, one at each side of the rump midline. Lower triangular spikes he placed at the sides of the tail, again gradually decreasing to the rear. In between the horizontal and vertical spikes of the rump probably rows of osteoderms were present having the profile of a droplet, with a vertical point at the broader end. The top of the tail had oval plates. The hip region was covered by a large pelvic shield consisting of fused osteoderms. These were patterned as rosettes with a larger plate in the middle, surrounded by at least two rings of smaller plates. Kirkland assumed that four pairs of triangular spikes covered the sides of the pelvic shield also, but this was denied by Paul. The area between all these larger elements was covered by small ossicles, round bony scutes with a diameter of up to two centimetres, hundreds of which have been discovered.

G. lorriemcwhinneyae differs from G. burgei in having a flat skull roof, shorter and narrower paroccipital processes, a postacetabular process that is only 36% the length of the preacetabular process, and an ischium that has an unkinked, smooth bottom edge.

== Phylogeny ==
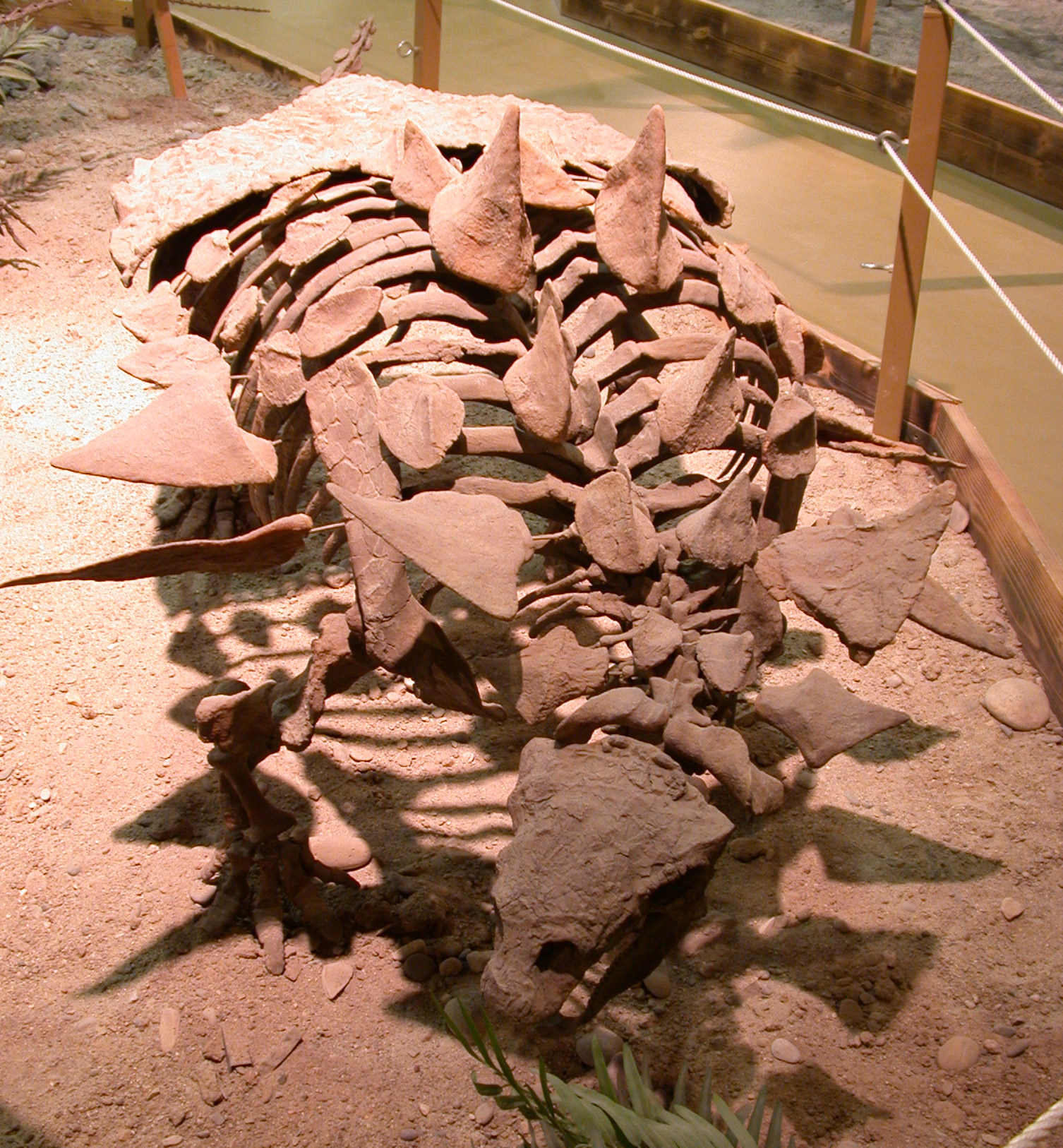
Skeleton at Wyoming Dinosaur Center

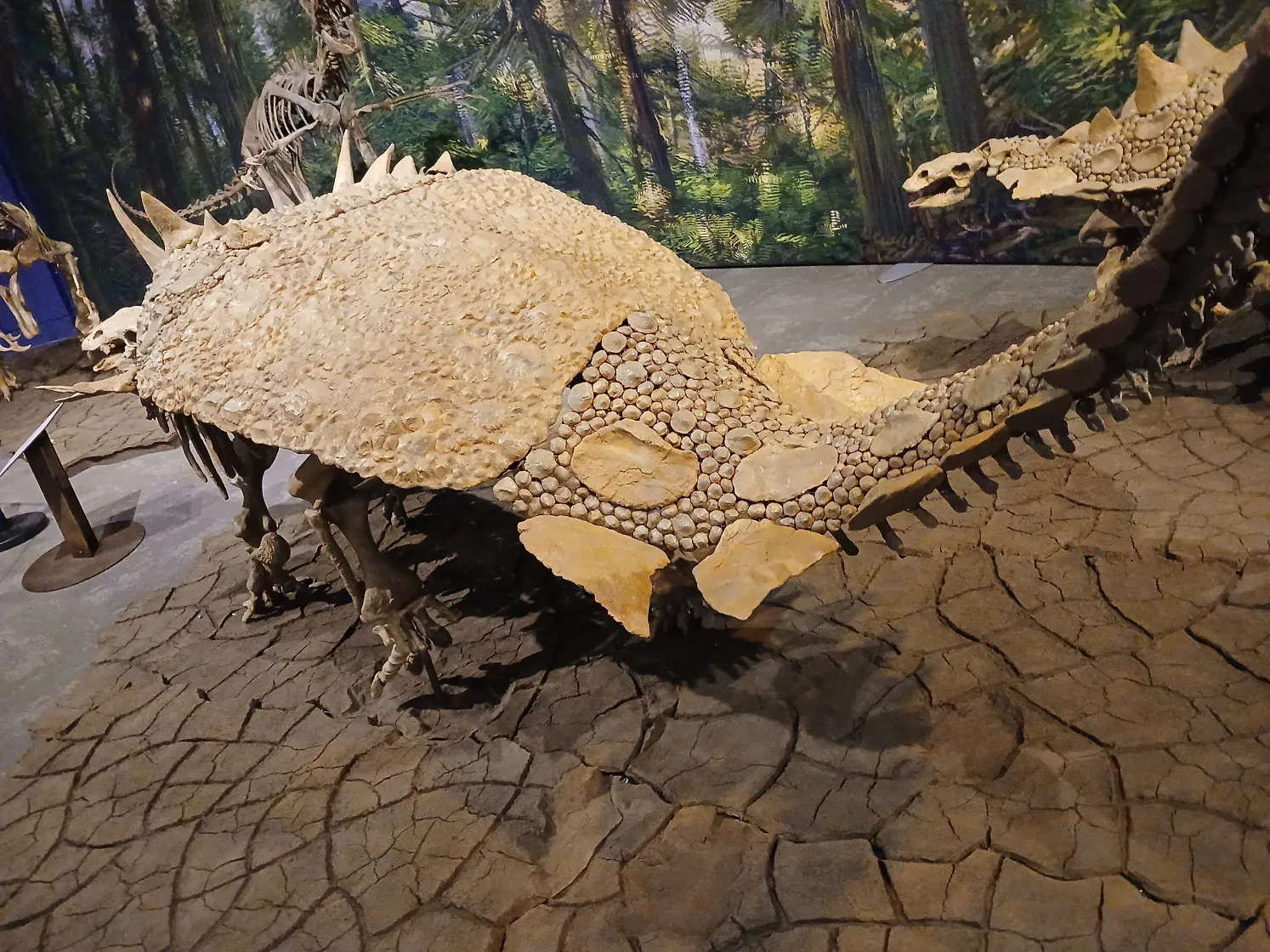
A mount of Gastonia viewed from behind to exemplify the sacral shield and plate-like osteoderms on the lateral sides of the anterior of the tail

Kirkland in 1998 placed Gastonia in the Ankylosauridae, more precisely the Polacanthinae. Later, polacanthines were often seen as Nodosauridae. However, in 2014 an analysis by Victoria Arbour recovered Gastonia as a non-polacanthine basal member of the Ankylosauridae.

A phylogenetic analysis conducted by Rivera-Sylva et al. (2018) and modified by Madzia et al. (2021) is reproduced below.

- Nodosauridae
  - - Sauroplites
    - Mymoorapelta
    - Dongyangopelta
  - - Gastonia
    - - Gargoyleosaurus
      - - Polacanthinae
          - Hoplitosaurus
          - Polacanthus
        - Nodosaurinae
          - Peloroplites
          - - Taohelong
            - Sauropelta
            - - Acantholipan
              - Nodosaurus
              - - Niobrarasaurus
                - Ahshislepelta
              - - Tatankacephalus
                - - Silvisaurus
                  - - CPC 273
                    - - Panoplosaurini
                        - Animantarx
                        - - Panoplosaurus
                          - - Argentinian ankylosaur (Patagopelta)
                            - Texasetes
                            - Denversaurus
                            - Edmontonia longiceps
                            - Edmontonia rugosidens
                      - Struthiosaurini
                        - - Hungarosaurus
                          - Europelta
                        - - Pawpawsaurus
                          - Stegopelta
                          - Struthiosaurus languedocensis
                          - - Struthiosaurus transylvanicus
                            - Struthiosaurus austriacus

== Paleobiology ==
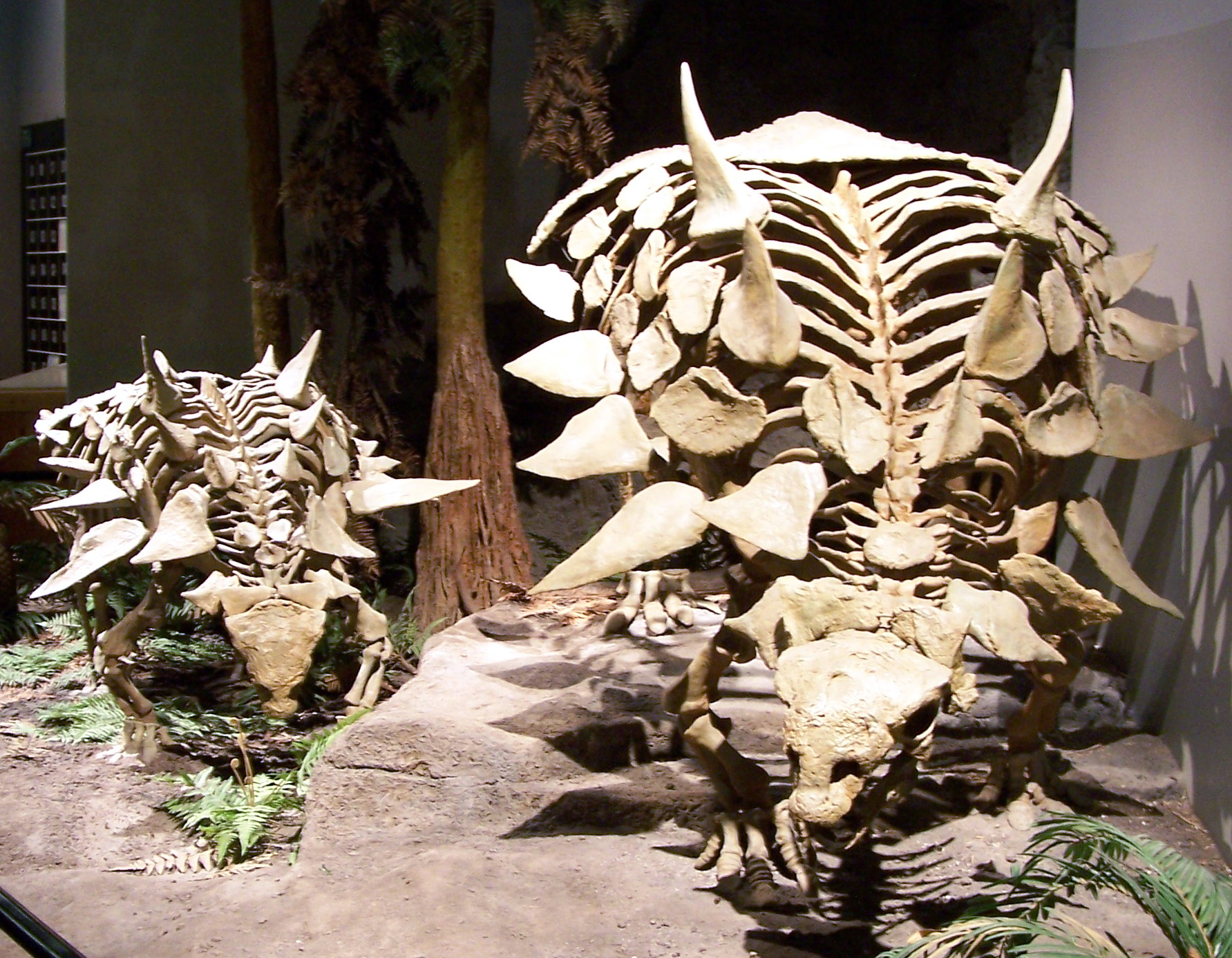
Skeletons at the North American Museum of Ancient Life with alternate spike arrangement

Gastonia lived in a partly wooded habitat, with riverine forests being separated by open areas. The climate was rather dry with a short wet season. Other dinosaurs of the Yellow Cat include the ornithopods Hippodraco and Cedrorestes, the sauropods Cedarosaurus and Moabosaurus, and the theropods Martharaptor, Nedcolbertia, and Utahraptor. Gastonia was the only ankylosaurian present and one of the most common species of its fauna.

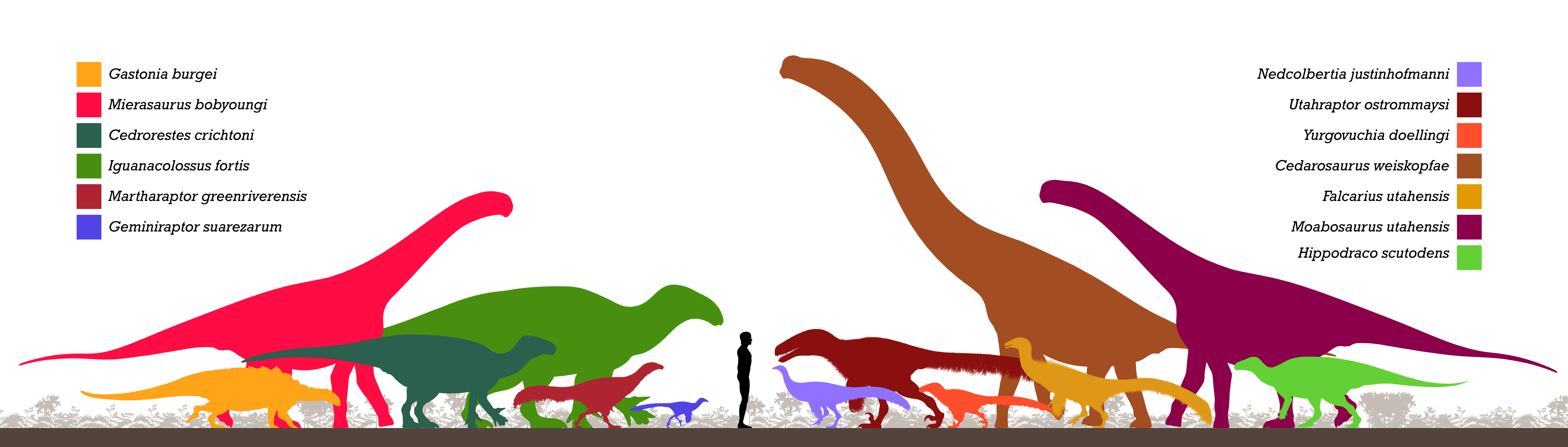
Gastonia compared to the fauna of the Yellow Cat Member from the Cedar Mountain Formation (Gastonia in pale yellow)

Kirkland suggested that Gastonia could have been so abundant because its armour effectively protected it against the apex predator of its habitat, the giant dromaeosaurid Utahraptor, remains of which have been found in the original Gastonia quarry. Gastonia would have shown a typical polacanthine defence, which Kirkland understood to have consisted of a combination of passive protection offered by the vertical spikes and active protection by hitting a predator with the horizontal spikes of the flexible tail. The armour would also have served intraspecific antagonistic behaviour, i.e. fighting between males. The vertical spikes could have intimidated rivals and animals could have determined who was the strongest by ramming their heads together. Kirkland proposed that the typical ankylosaurid down-turned head, made possible by a more ventrally directed occipital condyle compared to nodosaurids, and an increased loosening of the rear skull elements to absorb shocks, were adaptations to this kind of behaviour.

Ankylosaurs are often assumed to have been solitary living animals because their short legs seem poorly adapted to the trekking behaviour of herds, but the concentration of Gastonia fossils seems to contradict this.

== See also ==
- Timeline of ankylosaur research
- 2016 in paleontology
