= Combe Martin Wildlife and Dinosaur Park =

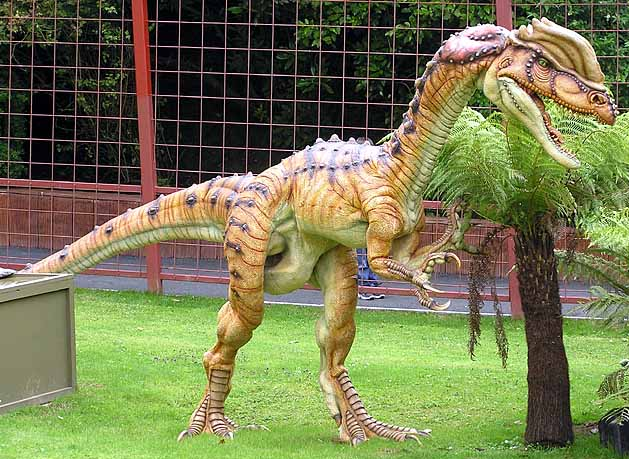
- Interactive map of Combe Martin Wildlife and Dinosaur Park
- 51.18896°N 4.00351°W
- Date opened: 1986
- Location: Combe Martin, Devon, England
- Website: cmwdp.co.uk

Combe Martin Wildlife and Dinosaur Park is a 28-acre wildlife sanctuary situated in Combe Martin, Devon, England. The park is home to animals such as meerkats and lemurs as well as animatronic dinosaurs.

== History ==
The park is situated on the site of Higher Leigh, a country house built in 1851 by Henry Keene Bowden as part of the larger Lee Barton estate. After nearly a century in the same family, the property passed to four nuns from the Sacred Heart Convent in Honor Oak, London, who transformed the building into a convent for children evacuated during the Second World War, as well as serving as school to some of the children of Combe Martin.

Over the following decades, the house variously served as a woolly monkey sanctuary and hotel, but had been derelict for many years when it was purchased by Robert Butcher in 1985. Originally intending to turn the house in to a nursing home, he instead created Combe Martin Wildlife Park, which opened in 1986. In 1992 the site was renamed to Combe Martin Wildlife & Dinosaur Park with the installation of animatronic dinosaurs.

Attractions added later include Tomb of the Pharaohs, the Dinosaur Museum, and the Dinosaur Playzone soft-play area.

In January 2025 the park was hit by a storm forcing the relocation of many of its animals. It opened three months later than usual in May after extensive repairs.

== Miniature railway ==
The site includes a 500-yard (460 m) long 15 in (381 mm) gauge railway. Originally nicknamed the Earthquake Canyon Train Ride, it ran for 150-yard (140 m) upon opening in 1989, extending to it present length in 1991. It is now known as the Dino Express, and is pulled by a Severn Lamb ‘Rio Grande’ MK2 locomotive.
