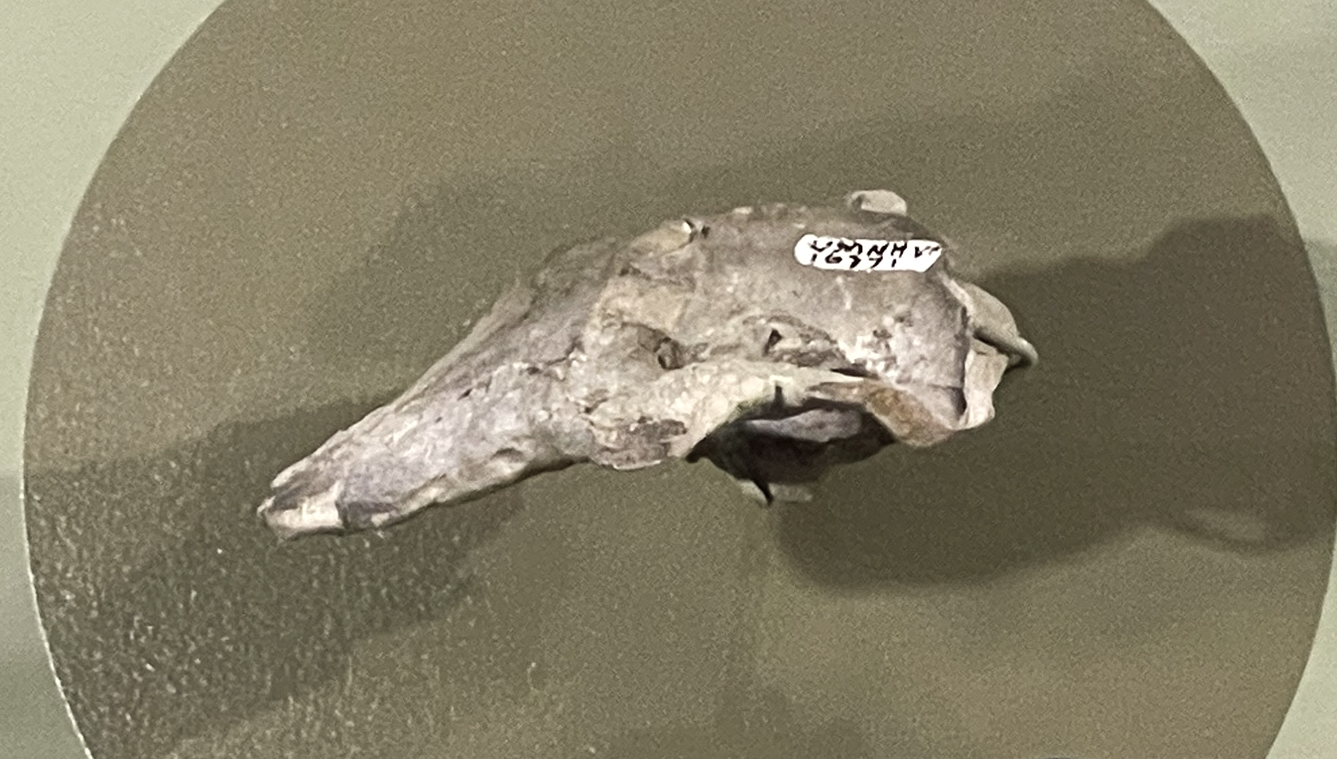
- Holotype skull of Cifelliodon wahkarmoosuch

Scientific classification
- Kingdom: Animalia
- Phylum: Chordata
- Clade: Synapsida
- Clade: Therapsida
- Clade: Cynodontia
- Clade: Mammaliaformes
- Genus: †Cifelliodon; Huttenlocker et al., 2018

Type species
- †Cifelliodon wahkarmoosuch Huttenlocker et al., 2018

= Cifelliodon =

Cifelliodon Temporal range: Early Cretaceous (Barremian), c. 124.2 Ma

Extinct genus of mammaliaform

Cifelliodon is an extinct genus of mammaliaform known from the Yellow Cat Member of the Cedar Mountain Formation in Utah, United States, dated to the Early Cretaceous. It contains the species Cifelliodon wahkarmoosuch, described in 2018 based on an isolated skull. This specimen is well preserved and large for a mammaliaform of its time period. Its teeth have been compared to those of the hammer-headed bat, a fruit-eater, while CT scans of the inner skull indicate a highly developed sense of smell. Some of its features resemble those of earlier mammaliamorphs of the Triassic, while others are seen in crown members of Mammalia.

The classification of Cifelliodon has been disputed, with the genus variously placed as a haramiyidan, an allotherian, or neither. The researchers who described it labelled it as evidence that mammaliamorphs with large bodies and diverse ecological roles lived in North America during the Early Cretaceous. The Yellow Cat Member, believed to represent a long span of geologic time, has also yielded remains of a range of dinosaurs and other animals.

== Discovery and naming ==
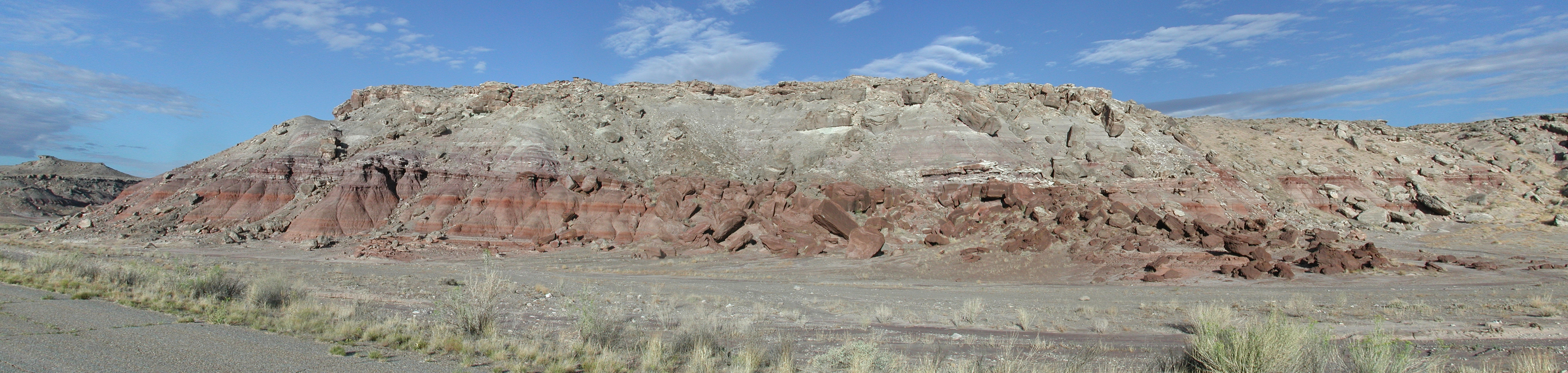
Rocks of the Cedar Mountain Formation; the grayish layer on top represents the Yellow Cat Member

Cifelliodon was described by the paleontologist Adam Huttenlocker and colleagues in 2018 based on a skull noted for its exceptional preservation. The skull was recovered from the upper Yellow Cat Member of the Cedar Mountain Formation. The locality from which it was recovered, Andrew's Site, was being excavated due to the presence of exposed dinosaur bones near the surface, and the skull of Cifelliodon was one of three skulls subsequently discovered during laboratory work. Other significant finds included the partial remains of multiple dinosaurs—iguanodontians and a dromaeosaurid—and a crocodyliform. The Yellow Cat Member is Early Cretaceous in age, at approximately 139 to 124 million years old according to radiometric dating estimates (based on uranium–lead isotope ratios of zircon crystals collected from other quarries), with the upper Yellow Cat Member usually dated to 124.2 ± 2.6 million years old. The type species of the genus Cifelliodon was named Cifelliodon wahkarmoosuch. Cifelliodon means 'Cifelli's tooth', in honor of the mammal paleontologist Richard Cifelli, while wahkarmoosuch comes from the Ute words for 'yellow' (wahkar) and 'cat' (moosuch), in reference to the Yellow Cat Member. The holotype skull was stored and prepared at the Natural History Museum of Utah, where it is now accessioned as specimen UMNH VP 16771.

== Description ==
The skull of Cifelliodon was noted for its large size relative to those of other mammaliaforms of the Mesozoic: 70 millimeters (2.8 in) in length, corresponding to an estimated total body mass of 0.91–1.27 kilograms (2.0–2.8 lb). The skull is broad and shallow, and the face is downturned. Most of its upper dentition is missing, but alveoli (tooth sockets) and roots are preserved corresponding to two incisors, one canine, and four postcanines, in addition to an unerupted pair of molars. The incisor roots are reclined back and converge centrally, indicating procumbency (inclination toward the lips), a trait found in haramiyidans that contrasts with the vertical orientation of roots of the upper teeth of most mammaliaforms. The alveoli of the postcanines appear to be similar in diameter to those of the canines. The final molar possesses a well-defined central valley that is closed-off from the front by a tall cusp (raised tooth point), as well as a lingual (tongue-facing) ridge that connects to a posterolingual (at the base of the tongue) cusp below, a pattern which Huttenlocker and colleagues compared with the teeth of the modern hammer-headed bat (Hypsignathus monstrosus), a fruit-eater. The molar was noted for its extensive similarity, aside from size and proportion, to that of Hahnodon taqueti, a mammaliaform from the Early Cretaceous of Morocco which had been previously identified as a multituberculate. The researchers wrote that the features of the molars of Cifelliodon and H. taqueti appeared more like those of haramiyidans than those multituberculates.

The holotype also displays a variety of ancient traits more commonly seen in mammaliamorphs of the Triassic than those of the Cretaceous. These include the shape of its parietal bones, which are waisted along their lateral (side) surfaces rather than bulging outward, the presence of a tabular bone, and the extension of the front part of the jugal bone. However, some of the features exhibited are found in crown-group mammals, including an extensive process (outgrowth of tissue) on the premaxilla that borders the nasal region, a reduced premaxilla process between the nostrils, and the limited extent of the rear end of the jugal bone. Computed tomography scans (CT scans) of the inner skull revealed traits intermediate between ancestral mammal relatives and crown mammals. Huttenlocker and colleagues described the size of the cranial vault (the space in the skull that contains the brain) as "modest", with an encephalization quotient (a measure of actual brain mass compared to expected brain mass based on body size) of between 0.25 and 0.30, which the authors wrote was smaller than those of the mammaliaform Hadrocodium and the Cretaceous crown mammals Vincelestes and Pucadelphys. They also wrote that much of the brain volume would have been taken up by olfactory bulbs and the piriform cortex (both associated with the sense of smell). The neocortex would have been small, its features poorly defined, especially compared with those of Cretaceous crown mammals. The authors concluded that the features of the brain support the hypothesis that haramiyidan brain development and behavior were primarily scent-oriented.

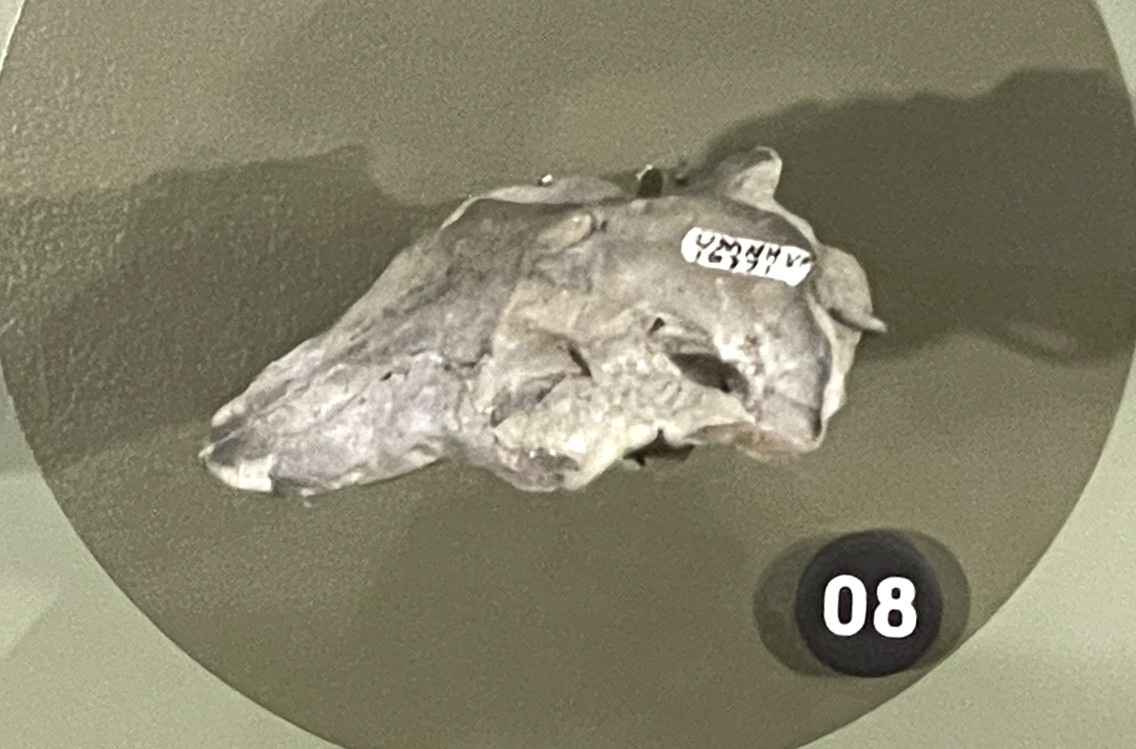
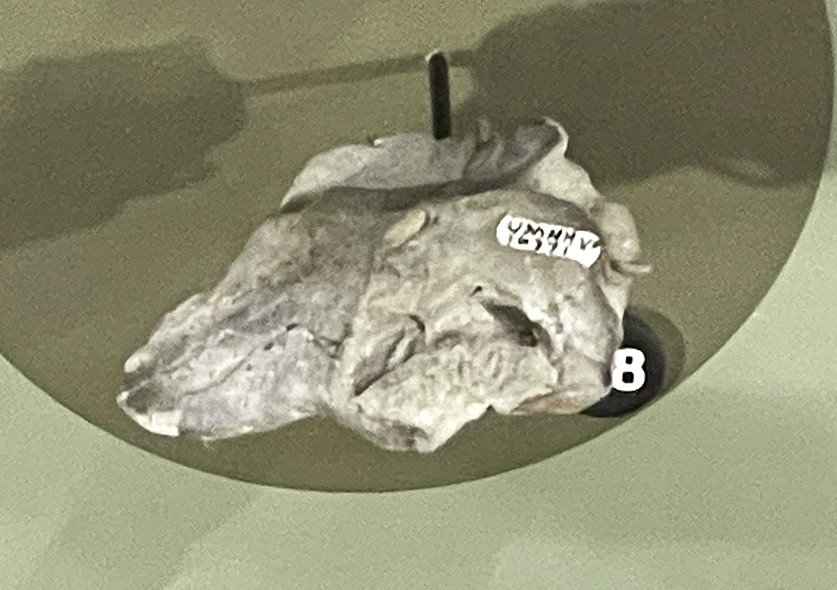
The holotype shown from additional angles

== Classification ==
In their description of Cifelliodon, Huttenlocker and colleagues expressed support for the recognition of Haramiyida, the order to which they assigned Cifelliodon, as a monophyletic group closely related to Mammalia, as opposed to belonging to Mammalia itself as a relative to the multituberculates, as some authors had proposed. They defined Haramiyida as all mammaliaforms more closely related to Thomasia and Haramiyavia than to Didelphis. Their phylogenetic analyses placed Cifelliodon as forming a polytomy with Hahnodon and Vintana—the latter of which is a gondwanathere—as members of the family Hahnodontidae. Their study supported the placement of Gondwanatheria within Haramiyida and outside of Mammalia. They wrote that the well preserved remains of Cifelliodon indicated a relationship between hahnodontids and Haramiyida (placing the former group within the latter).

In 2020, the paleontologist David W. Krause and colleagues reassessed the relationships of mammaliaform lineages and placed Cifelliodon within Mammalia at the base of Allotheria. According to their work (shown in Topology A below), Allotheria also contains Euharamiyida and a clade formed by Multituberculata and Gondwanatheria. The aforementioned haramiyidans Haramiyavia and Thomasia, as well as the poorly studied Megaconus, were placed outside of Mammaliaformes altogether. A study published later that year by Simone Hoffman and colleagues found consistent support for Cifelliodon as an allotherian based on several different analyses. There was some variation regarding its exact placement; strict consensus trees supported a basal position for the genus, while tip-dated Bayesian analyses recovered it as closer to gondwanatheres. The authors also wrote that, while there was evidence for a monophyletic Haramiyida containing Haramiyavia and Thomasia (with ambiguity regarding their external relationships with other mammaliaforms: either crown mammals or outside of Mammaliaformes altogether), such a group would not include Cifelliodon (or Euharamiyida).

Analyses of mammaliaform relationships based on ear anatomy by Junyou Wang and colleagues placed Cifelliodon as an allotherian, in a polytomy with several haramiyidans (including Vilevolodon) and a clade formed by Gondwanatheria and Multituberculata. Their results (shown in Topology C) also supported the placement of Haramiyavia as an allotherian, which would indicate an early origin of crown mammals no less than 215 million years ago. Cifelliodon was again recovered as an allotherian by Fangyuan Mao and colleagues, their analyses (shown in Topology D) placing it as the sister group of a clade formed by Euharamiyida and Gondwanatheria and also moving Haramiyavia and Thomasia within Allotheria. A September 2023 study (shown in Topology B) by the paleontologist Zhiqiang Yu and colleagues instead placed Cifelliodon outside of Mammalia, as a close relative of Haramiyavia and Thomasia (all three of which were placed within Mammaliaformes). The study found no close relationship between the three aforementioned genera and euharamiyidans (with the latter group recognized as crown mammals).

Various proposed classifications of Cifelliodon

Topology A: Strict consensus parsimony tree of Huttenlocker et al. (2018)

- Mammaliaformes
  - Other early mammaliaforms
  - - †Haramiyida
      - - †Haramiyavia
        - †Thomasia
      - †Euharamiyida
        - †Megaconus
        - - - †Cifelliodon
            - †Hahnodon
            - †Vintana (†Gondwanatheria)
          - - †Eleutherodontidae
    - - Crown Mammalia
        (including Multituberculata)

Topology B: Bayesian tip-dated tree of Yu et al. (2023)

- Mammaliaformes
  - - †Haramiyavia
    - - †Cifelliodon
      - †Thomasia
  - - †Other early mammaliaforms
  - - †Other early mammaliaforms
    - Crown Mammalia
      - Basal crown mammals
      - - - †Euharamiyida
          - †Multituberculata
        - - Trechnotheria

Topology C: Strict consensus parsimony tree of Wang et al. (2021)

- Mammalia
  - Basal crown mammals
  - - †Allotheria
      - †Haramiyavia
      - - †Cifelliodon
        - †Haramiyida
          (including Thomasia and Eleutherodontidae)
        - - †Gondwanatheria
          - †Multituberculata
    - - Trechnotheria

Topology D: Strict consensus parsimony tree of Mao et al. (2023)

- Mammalia
  - Basal crown mammals
  - - †Allotheria
      - - †Haramiyavia
        - †Theroteinus spp.
      - - †Multituberculata
        - - †Thomasia
          - - †Cifelliodon
            - - †Euharamiyida
              - †Gondwanatheria
    - - Trechnotheria

== Paleoecology ==
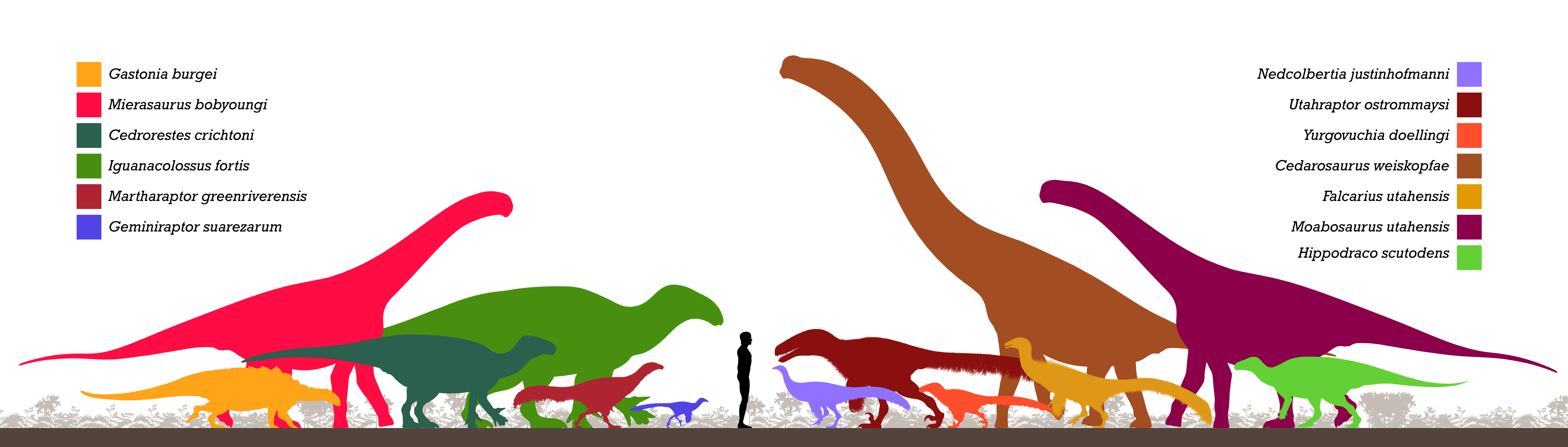
A diagram depicting the named dinosaurs found in the Yellow Cat Member of the Cedar Mountain Formation

The skull of Cifelliodon is remarkably large for an Early Cretaceous mammal. The animal would have been approximately the size of a medium hare at a time when most mammals were around shrew- or mouse-sized. Only one known North American contemporary was larger: the carnivorous Gobiconodon ostromi. Huttenlocker and colleagues wrote that the discovery of Cifelliodon supported the idea that haramiyidans, with which they classified the genus, survived until the Early Cretaceous and ranged across the ancient continents of Laurasia and Gondwana. They also described the presence of related dinosaur taxa across the continents as evidence of intercontinental links existing longer than previously thought. They identified the mid-Cretaceous radiation of other mammalian groups, namely multituberculates and tribosphenids, as coinciding with the extinctions of many of their less derived relatives. They labelled Cifelliodon as evidence that large-bodied mammaliamorphs with diverse ecological roles persisted in North American ecosystems until the mid-Cretaceous.

The Yellow Cat Member of the Cedar Mountain Formation, from which Cifelliodon is known, is characterized by its well-preserved dinosaur fossils, which are believed to record a relatively long span of geologic time. The Yellow Cat Member is distinct from other geologic units of the Cedar Mountain Formation, with its own relict vertebrate fauna with Jurassic affinities similar to the Wealden fauna of Europe. Dinosaurs found in the upper Yellow Cat Member (as Cifelliodon was) include ankylosaurs (represented by the well-recorded Gastonia burgei—a polacanthid), iguanodontians (represented by at least three taxa), sauropods (represented by Cedarosaurus weiskopfae—a brachiosaurid—and turiasaur remains), dromaeosaurids (represented by the exceptionally large Utahraptor ostrommaysi—a dromaeosaurine—and an apparent small velociraptorine), a therizinosauroid (Martharaptor greenriverensis), and other theropods including the small Nedcolbertia justinhofmanni and a larger unidentified ornithomimid. The rocks have also yielded North America's oldest bird tracks. While no remains indicating the presence of a large allosauroid have been found in the upper Yellow Cat Member as of 2018, they are found in strata above and below. Other vertebrates found include a diverse range of fish and crocodyliforms, baenid turtles, and a sphenodont, as well as more fragmentary neochoristodere and pterosaur remains. Invertebrates include ostracods, clam shrimp, and snails.

== See also ==
- List of prehistoric mammals
- List of the Mesozoic life of Utah
