= Hahnodontidae =

Hahnodontidae Temporal range: 145–120 Ma

Scientific classification
- Domain: Eukaryota
- Kingdom: Animalia
- Phylum: Chordata
- Clade: Synapsida
- Clade: Therapsida
- Clade: Cynodontia
- Clade: Mammaliaformes
- Order: †Haramiyida
- Family: †Hahnodontidae; Sigogneau-Russell, 1991

Genera
- Cifelliodon; Hahnodon; Denisodon

Extinct family of mammaliaforms

Hahnodontidae is a family of extinct mammaliaforms from Early Cretaceous deposits in Morocco and the Western United States. Although originally considered to belong to the extinct clade Multituberculata, recent work indicates that hahnodontids belong to the more primitive clade Haramiyida.

== Distribution ==
The genera Hahnodon and Denisodon occur in the Early Cretaceous of Morocco, while the genus Cifelliodon is found in the Barremian-age Yellow Cat Member of the Cedar Mountain Formation in Utah.

== Phylogeny ==
Sigogneau-Russell (1991) and Hahn & Hahn (2003) classified hahnodontids as multituberculates, but the cladistic analysis of Cifelliodon recovered them outside Multituberculata as phylogenetically intermediate between Docodonta and crown Mammalia. The gondwanathere Vintana was also recovered as sister to members of Hahnodontidae.
