= Cedar Mountain =

Cedar Mountain may refer to:

- Cedar Mountain (Moffat County, Colorado), a summit in the Elkhead Mountains
- Cedar Mountain (Montana), a summit in the Madison Range
- Cedar Mountain, North Carolina, an unincorporated community in Transylvania County, North Carolina, United States
- Cedar Mountain, Virginia, a piedmont monadnock in Culpeper County, Virginia
  - Battle of Cedar Mountain
- Cedar Mountain (Wyoming), also known as Spirit Mountain, near the town of Cody

== See also ==
- Cedar Mountain Formation, a sedimentary rock formation layer in Utah
- Cedar Mountain Range, a mountain range in New Mexico
- Cedar Mountains (disambiguation)
