= Denise Sigogneau-Russell =

French palaeontologist

- Born: Denise Sigogneau c. 1941/42; France
- Scientific career
- Workplaces: Muséum National d'Histoire Naturelle

Denise Sigogneau-Russell (born c. 1941/42) is a French palaeontologist who specialises in mammals from the Mesozoic, particularly from France and the UK. She is currently based at the Muséum National d'Histoire Naturelle.

== Background ==
Denise Sigogneau-Russell completed her PhD in 1969 on therapsids - the forerunners of mammals - from South Africa, where she spent two years. In 1976 a Belgian amateur fossil hunter brought her a mammal tooth from a quarry in eastern France, and this inspired her to change direction and begin research on mammals from the Mesozoic. She subsequently studied them in France, Portugal, Madagascar, Morocco, and England. Zofia Kielan-Jaworowska said that due to Sigogneau-Russell's "scholarship and diligence, she has contributed enormously to the knowledge of early mammal evolution.".

She was married to Donald E. Russell, also a palaeontologist specialising in mammals, with whom she carried out field projects and collaborated.

== Research ==
Sigogneau-Russell has published on many mammals and their predecessors, but she is best known for her work on Triassic triconodonts and morganucodontans, haramiyids and multituberculates, and British Cretaceous mammals with collaborator, Percy Butler. She has also written reviews of the anatomy and taxonomy of synapsids and therapsids, as well as co-authoring papers on more recent fossil mammals.

In 1983 Sigogneau-Russell published her first review of the mammals from Rhaetian rocks in Saint-Nicholas-de-Port in Lorraine, France. She later published on more material from this area, including over 200 teeth obtained by screen-washing sediment. In 1991 she published a book on Mesozoic mammals, Les mammifères au temps des dinosaures

She has authored over 56 research papers and contributed many more articles on palaeontology. She has named at least 3 orders and families, 5 genera, and 5 species of Mesozoic mammal from the Triassic, Jurassic and Cretaceous periods.

== Scientific contributions ==
Taxonomic names erected by Denise Sigogneau-Russell:

Haramiyidans:

- †Haramiyida Hahn, Sigogneau-Russell & Wouters, 1989
  - †Hahnodon Sigogneau-Russell, 1991
    - †Hahnodon taqueti Sigogneau-Russell, 1991
  - †Purbeckodon Butler, Sigogneau-Russell & Ensom, 2011
    - †Purbeckodon batei Butler, Sigogneau-Russell & Ensom, 2011
- †Theroteinidae Sigogneau-Russell, Frank & Hammerle 1986
  - †Theroteinus Sigogneau-Russell, Frank & Hammerle 1986
    - †Theroteinus nikolai Sigogneau-Russell, Frank & Hammerle 1986

Docodontans:

- †Borealestes mussettae (now Dorbunnodon) Sigogneau-Russell, 2003
- †Krusatodon Sigogneau-Russell, 2003
  - †Krusatodon kirtlingtonensis Sigogneau-Russell, 2003

Non-mammals:

- †Rubricacaecilia Evans & Sigogneau-Russell, 2003
  - †Rubricacaecilia monbaroni Evans & Sigogneau-Russell, 2003
- †Tingitana Evans & Sigogneau-Russell, 1997
  - †Tingitana anoualae Evans & Sigogneau-Russell, 1997
