= Fleming Fjord Formation =

Geological formation in Greenland

- Stratigraphic range: Norian-Rhaetian; ~222–202 Ma
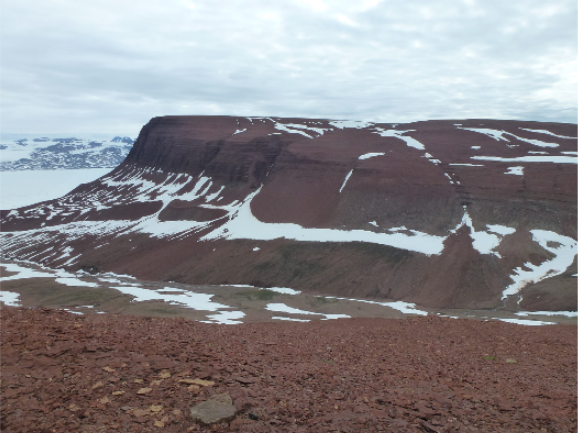
- The Buch Bjerg "Track-site" at the Fleming Fjord Formation
- Type: Geological formation
- Unit of: Scoresby Land Group
- Sub-units: Edderfugledal, Malmros Klint & Ørsted Dal Members
- Underlies: Kap Stewart Group
- Overlies: Gippsdalen Formation
- Area: 3,000 km^{2} (1,200 sq mi)
- Thickness: 200–300 m (660–980 ft)

Lithology
- Primary: Mudstone, claystone
- Other: Limestone, sandstone

Location
- Coordinates: 71.9°N 22.56°W
- Approximate paleocoordinates: 45.7°N 2.8°W
- Region: East Greenland
- Country: Greenland
- Extent: Jameson Land

Type section
- Named for: Fleming Fjord
- Fleming Fjord Formation (Greenland)

The Fleming Fjord Formation, alternatively called the Fleming Fjord Group is an Upper Triassic geological formation in the northeastern coast of Jameson Land, Greenland. It consists of terrestrial sediments and is known for its fossil content.

== Description ==
It is of Norian to Rhaetian age and is subdivided into three members; at the base the Edderfugledal Member, followed by the Malmros Klint Member with the Ørsted Dal Member at the top. It was deposited in a large shallow to ephemeral lake.

== Paleobiota ==
The fauna of Fleming Fjord is diverse, including sauropodomorph dinosaurs, pterosaurs, temnospondyls, mammaliaforms, aetosaurs, and other taxa. Freshwater unionid bivalves and conchostracans have been reported from the Malmros Klint Member.

=== Fish ===
Lungfish, actinopterygian, and chondrichthyan teeth have been reported from the Malmros Klint Member.

Fish of the Fleming Fjord Formation
Genus / Taxon	Species	Locality	Member	Materials	Notes
Ceratodus	C. tunuensis		Ørsted Dal Member		A lungfish, possibly synonymous with Ptychoceratodus rectangulus
Ferganoceratodus	F. rectangulus		Ørsted Dal Member		A lungfish
Lissodus	L. lepagei, L. cf. L. minimus		Carlsberg Fjord Mb of Ørsted Dal Fm		A hybodont shark
Rhomphaiodon	Indeterminate		Carlsberg Fjord Mb of Ørsted Dal Fm		A synechodontiform shark
Saurichthys	Indeterminate		Carlsberg Fjord Mb of Ørsted Dal Fm		A saurichthyiform ray-finned fish
Gyrolepis	Indeterminate		Carlsberg Fjord Mb of Ørsted Dal Fm		A primitive "palaeoniscoid" ray-finned fish

=== Amphibians ===
Amphibians of the Fleming Fjord Formation
Genus / Taxon	Species	Locality	Member	Materials	Notes	Images
Cyclotosaurus	C. naraserluki		Ørsted Dal Member		A capitosaurian temnospondyl	Cyclotosaurus
Gerrothorax	G. cf. pulcherrimus		Malmros Klint Member, and Ørsted Dal Member		A plagiosaurid temnospondyl	Cyclotosaurus
Salientia	indet.		Ørsted Dal Member		A potential stem-group anuran (frog)	Cyclotosaurus

=== Archosaurs ===
Besides the forms described below, a diverse ichnofauna of small and large tracks has also been reported from the Malmros Klint Member, as well as coprolites and additional theropod, pterosaur, and turtle fossils.

Color key: Taxon / Reclassified taxon / Taxon falsely reported as present / Dubious taxon or junior synonym / Ichnotaxon / Ootaxon / Morphotaxon	Notes; Uncertain or tentative taxa are in small text; ~~crossed out~~ taxa are discredited.

==== Avemetatarsalia ====
Avemetatarsalians of the Fleming Fjord Formation
Genus / Taxon	Species	Locality	Member	Materials	Notes	Images
Arcticodactylus	A. cromptonellus	Carlsberg Fjord Beds	Ørsted Dal Member	Specimens consist of a partial skeleton with a skull	A eudimorphodontid pterosaur	Eosauropus Issi saaneq
Eosauropus	E. sp.		Ørsted Dal Member		Large (>40 cm per footprint) quadrupedal tracks, likely produced by an early sauropod related to Eusauropoda	Eosauropus Issi saaneq
Evazoum	E. sp.		Ørsted Dal Member		Large (~36 cm per footprint) bipedal tracks, likely produced by a plateosaurian sauropodomorph. By far the largest prints assigned to this ichnogenus	Eosauropus Issi saaneq
Grallator	G. sp.		Malmros Klint Member, Ørsted Dal Member		Small bipedal tracks, likely produced by theropods	Eosauropus Issi saaneq
Issi	I. saaneq	Iron Cake Site	Malmros Klint Member	Specimens consists of juvenile skull, and partial skeletons	A plateosaurid sauropodomorph closely related to (and previously referred to) Plateosaurus	Eosauropus Issi saaneq
Plateosauridae	indet.		Malmros Klint Member, Ørsted Dal Member		Undescribed fossils of plateosaurid sauropodomorphs, including complete skeletons. Plateosaurid skull material has been named as the species Issi saaneq	Eosauropus Issi saaneq

==== Pseudosuchians ====
Pseudosuchians of the Fleming Fjord Formation
Genus / Taxon	Species	Locality	Member	Materials	Notes	Images
Aetosaurus	A. ferratus		Ørsted Dal Member		A small aetosaur	Paratypothorax andressorum
cf. Brachychirotherium	B. cf. sp.		Ørsted Dal Member	Footprints	Small quadrupedal tracks, likely produced by small or juvenile pseudosuchians	Paratypothorax andressorum
Paratypothorax	P. andressorum		Ørsted Dal Member?	An osteoderm	A moderate-sized paratypothoracin aetosaur	Paratypothorax andressorum
Mystriosuchus	M. alleroq		Malmros Klint Mb, Carlsberg Fjord Mb of Ørsted Dal Fm		A parasuchid phytosaur	Paratypothorax andressorum
Phytosauria	indet.		Malmros Klint Member		Indeterminate phytosaur fossils, including adult and juvenile specimens	Paratypothorax andressorum

==== Other archosaurs ====
Other archosaurs of the Fleming Fjord Formation
Genus / Taxon	Species	Locality	Member	Materials	Notes	Images
Clevosauridae	C. sp		Carlsberg Fjord Mb of Ørsted Dal Fm		A rhynchocephalian reptile. Closely resembles Clevosaurus.	
Doswelliidae	Indeterminate		Carlsberg Fjord Mb of Ørsted Dal Fm		A proterochampsian archosauriform	

==== Pantestudines ====
Pantestudines of the Fleming Fjord Formation
Genus / Taxon	Species	Locality	Member	Materials	Notes	Images
Cryptochersis	C. paraxene	Stairmaster Quarry	Ørsted Dal Member	Left part of the posterior plastral lobe	A proterochersid	Proganochelys
cf. Proganochelys	P. cf. sp.		Ørsted Dal Member		Turtle fossils possibly referrable to Proganochelys	Proganochelys
Testudinata	indet.		Malmros Klint Member?, Ørsted Dal Member		Indeterminate testudinatan (turtle) fossils	Proganochelys
Ypomonetikochelys	Y. euryaspis		Ørsted Dal Member	A partial shell, associated appendicular elements and incomplete tail bones	A proganochelyid	Proganochelys

=== Synapsids ===
Synapsids of the Fleming Fjord Formation
Genus / Taxon	Species	Locality	Member	Materials	Notes	Images
Brachyzostrodon	B. cf. sp.		Ørsted Dal Member		A morganucodont mammaliaform	Haramiyavia clemmenseni
Haramiyavia	H. clemmenseni		Ørsted Dal Member		A haramiyid mammaliaform	Haramiyavia clemmenseni
Kalaallitkigun	K. jenkinsi		Ørsted Dal Member		A haramiyid mammaliaform	Haramiyavia clemmenseni
Kuehneotherium	K. sp.		Ørsted Dal Member		A kuehneotheriid mammaliaform	Haramiyavia clemmenseni
Mitredon	M. cromptoni		Ørsted Dal Member		A probainognathian cynodont with uncertain affinities	Haramiyavia clemmenseni

== See also ==
- List of dinosaur-bearing rock formations
- List of fossiliferous stratigraphic units in Greenland
