= Avashishta =

Avashishta Temporal range: Maastrichtian

Scientific classification
- Kingdom: Animalia
- Phylum: Chordata
- Clade: Synapsida
- Clade: Therapsida
- Clade: Cynodontia
- Clade: Mammaliaformes
- Order: †Haramiyida
- Genus: †Avashishta; Anantharaman et al, 2006
- Species: †A. bacharamensis

Binomial name
- †Avashishta bacharamensis Anantharaman et al, 2006

Extinct genus of mammaliaforms

Avashishta bacharamensis ('remains from Bacharam') is an extinct species of a possible late surviving haramiyid from the Maastrichtian Lameta formation of India. It is known from a solitary molariform (possibly a right upper molariform) tooth. It might represent the last known non-mammalian synapsid.

== Description ==
The holotype specimen, GSI/SR/PAL-B215 has suffered breakage at the mesial end of the crown, along with missing enamel from both the distal end and the lateral sides of the crown. The roots of the tooth are not preserved either. Among haramiyidans, Avashishta is morphologically most similar to Allostaffia. It also appears to represent another paleobiogeographic link among southern continents and supports the hypothesis that the Indian Late Cretaceous mammalian fauna included lineages of both Laurasian and Gondwanan origin. It should also be noted that the coordinates (17 °20' N, 79°50'E) provided by Anantharaman et al. (2006) and Wilson et al. (2007) for the site "do not match the ground realities with discrepancies ranging from 5 to over a hundred kilometers."
