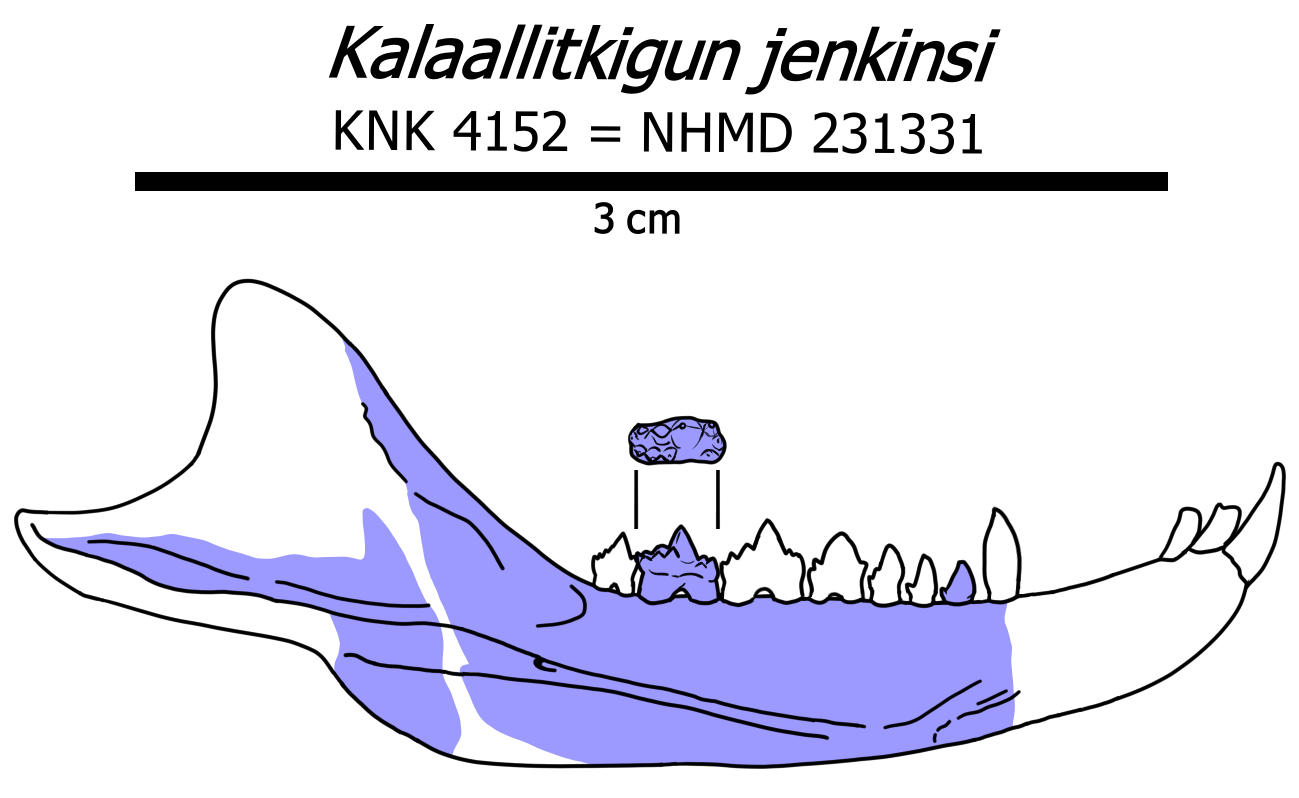
- Jaw diagram in lingual (internal) view, preserved areas in blue

Scientific classification
- Domain: Eukaryota
- Kingdom: Animalia
- Phylum: Chordata
- Clade: Synapsida
- Clade: Therapsida
- Clade: Cynodontia
- Clade: Mammaliaformes
- Order: †Haramiyida
- Genus: †Kalaallitkigun; Sulej et al., 2020
- Species: †K. jenkinsi

Binomial name
- †Kalaallitkigun jenkinsi Sulej et al., 2020

= Kalaallitkigun =

Kalaallitkigun Temporal range: mid-late Norian, 215 Ma

Extinct genus of mammaliaforms

Kalaallitkigun is an extinct genus of haramiyidan mammaliaforms from the Late Triassic of Greenland. It contains a single species, Kalaallitkigun jenkinsi, which was described in 2020 from a partial dentary (lower jaw) found in the Fleming Fjord Formation. More specifically, it was found in the mid-late Norian (~215 Ma) Carlsberg Fjord beds of the Ørsted Dal Member. It is the oldest of several mammaliaform species discovered in the Late Triassic sediments of Greenland. It is also the oldest mammaliaform with double-rooted teeth, and its pattern of tooth cusps help to clarify the evolution of haramiyidan teeth relative to their morganucodont-like ancestors.

== Description ==
The holotype and only known specimen consists of a partial dentary preserving two teeth: the first premolariform (pm1) and second molariform (m2). Empty alveoli (sockets) for three more premolariforms and two more molariforms are also present in the preserved portion of the jaw. This gives a total number of four premolariforms and three molariforms, similar to Haramiyavia. The front of the dentary is broken off, so the shape and number of incisor and canine teeth are unknown. The thinnest portions of the posterior dentary are also not preserved.

The dentary was relatively large, with proportionally small teeth. The meckelian groove, a furrow on the lingual (internal) surface of the dentary, widens towards the rear and merges with the postdentary trough (the groove which hosts the postdentary bones). The postdentary trough slopes upwards and is divided from the overlying coronoid fossa via a strong ridge. Unlike Morganucodon and earlier cynodonts, there is no groove on the inner surface directly under the molariform teeth. The masseteric fossa (on the outer rear surface of the dentary) is voluminous but shifted back past the level of the last molariform. The preserved premolariform tooth is single-rooted and simple, with a larger cusp at the front and a much smaller one at the back.

=== Molariform ===
The molariform m2 is intermediate in structure between the triconodont pattern seen in taxa such as Morganucodon (with large triangular cusps in a single row) and the specialized two-row pattern found in the more derived euharamiyidans. Like haramiyidans, there are two parallel rows of cusps separated by a median furrow. The four labial (outer/cheek side) cusps are homologous to the four main cusps of morganucodonts (from front to back: b, a, c, and d), with cusp a being the largest and cusp c as the second-largest. They can also be homologized to cusps b1 to b4 of Haramiyavia. In contrast to other haramiyidans (but like morganucodonts), the labial cusps of Kalaallitkigun are significantly larger than the cusps on the lingual (inner/tongue) side of the tooth. Cusp a in particular is large enough that it restricts the median furrow and divides the space into two basins.

In the lingual tooth row, there are four small cusps (e', g, g', and i'). These cusps are homologous to cusps a1 to a4 of Haramiyavia. Cusp g, though still small, is the largest cusp in the lingual row, lying inwards from cusps a and c. Two additional small cusps are present in the tooth: cusps e (at the front tip) and i (the rear tip). The holotype of Kalaallitkigun is the oldest mammaliaform fossil with two roots per tooth, a condition which occurs in all molariforms and the last premolariform in the fossil, according to the shape of tooth sockets. The splitting of the root probably helped to reduce stresses at the crown-root boundary of the tooth.
