= Cedar Mountains =

Cedar Mountains may refer to the following mountains in the United States:

- Cedar Mountains (Nevada)
- Cedar Mountains (Iron County, Utah), a mountain range of Utah
- Cedar Mountains (Tooele County, Utah)
  - Cedar Mountain Wilderness

== See also ==
- Cedar Mountain (disambiguation)
- Cedar Mountain Range, mountain range in New Mexico
