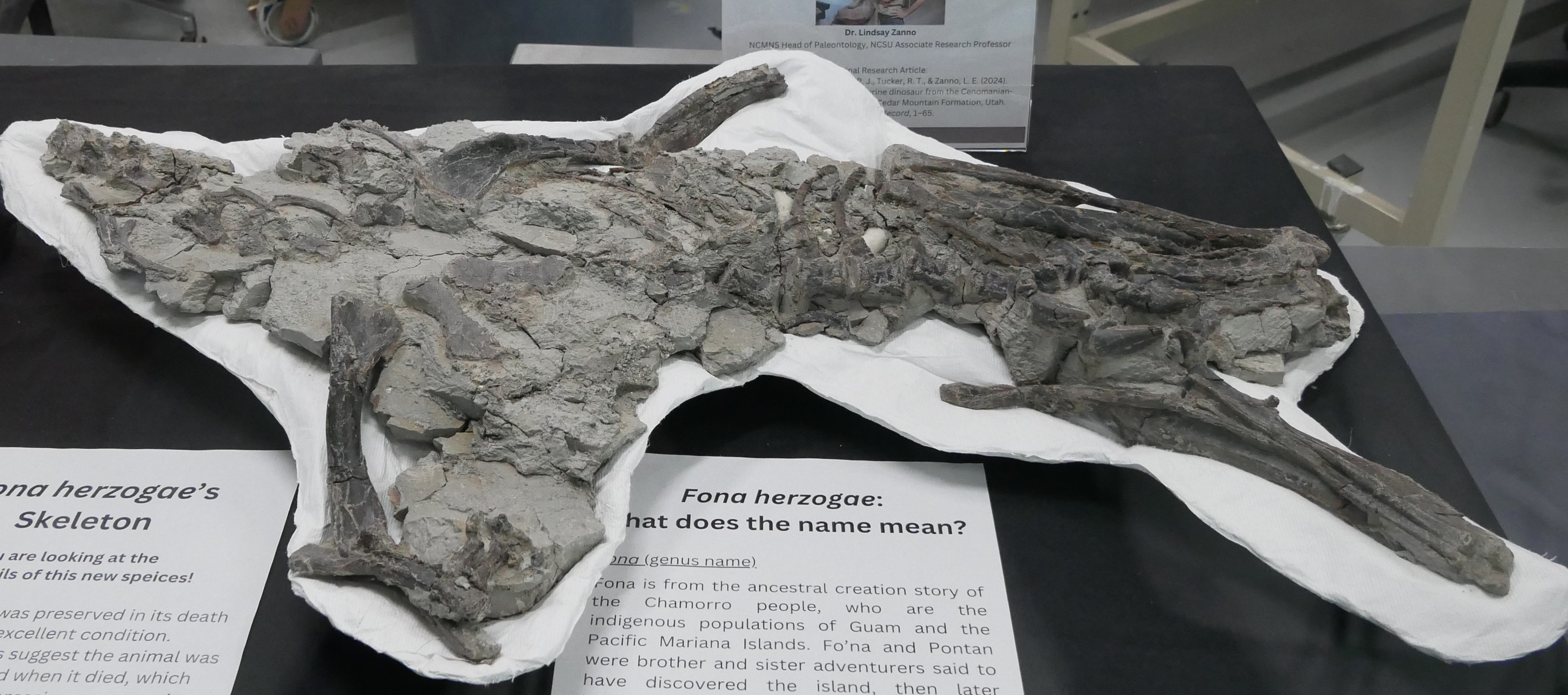
- Holotype at the North Carolina Museum of Natural Sciences
- Reconstructed skeleton

Scientific classification
- Kingdom: Animalia
- Phylum: Chordata
- Class: Reptilia
- Clade: Dinosauria
- Clade: †Ornithischia
- Family: †Thescelosauridae
- Subfamily: †Thescelosaurinae
- Genus: †Fona; Avrahami et al., 2024
- Species: †F. herzogae

Binomial name
- †Fona herzogae Avrahami et al., 2024

= Fona =

Fona Temporal range: Late Cretaceous (Cenomanian), ~99.4–99.2 Ma

Genus of thescelosaurid dinosaurs

Fona (/ˈfoʊtnɑː/ foht-NAH; lit. 'the origin') is an extinct genus of thescelosaurine thescelosaurid ornithischian dinosaurs from the 'mid'-Cretaceous Cedar Mountain Formation (Mussentuchit Member) of Utah, United States. The genus contains a single species, F. herzogae, known from several partial skeletons and skulls. Based on anatomical similarities to the closely related and similarly aged Oryctodromeus, Fona was likely a semi-fossorial animal, likely spending a significant amount of time in underground burrows. It also represents the oldest known definitive thescelosaurine.

== Discovery and naming ==
Composite skull reconstruction of F. herzogae (top) with details of each bone (bottom)

The Fona fossil material was discovered in multiple different localities of the Mussentuchit Member of the Cedar Mountain Formation in Emery County of Utah, United States. The holotype specimen, NCSM 33548, was found in the 'Karmic Orodromine locality' and represents the only certain occurrence of Fona in the lower Mussentuchit Member. This specimen consists of mostly complete and somewhat articulated skeleton. Other outcrops yielded several other specimens referrable to Fona based on similarities in the skeletal anatomy. FMNH PR 4581 was found in the 'Manolo site', which is slightly younger than the holotype locality. It is also a mostly complete skeleton, missing most of the cranium, pelvis, and metatarsals. The youngest rocks with Fona material represent the 'Mini Troll locality'. Here, the skeletons of two well preserved, similarly sized individuals were found together, as well as some bones of juvenile specimens.

Prior to the formal naming of Fona, the fossil material was reported in several conference abstracts and academic papers without thorough description, where it was typically mentioned as belonging to an orodromine thescelosaurid.

In 2024, Avrahami et al. described Fona herzogae as a new genus and species of thescelosaurine ornithopod based on these fossil remains. The generic name, Fona, references a figure of the same name in CHamoru culture (in Finoʼ CHamoru, an Austronesian language). Here, Fona (whose name means "the origin") is the ancestral maga'håga, or authoritative female in a clan. According to tradition, she used her powers to turn herself and her brother into the Earth and the life on it, after which she turns into stone. This story recalls the associated skeletons of two Fona subadults—which may have been siblings or a male/female pair that were fossilized—as well as efforts to recognize the equality of men and women and decolonize paleontology. The specific name, herzogae, honors Lisa Herzog, the discoverer of the Mini Troll locality from which several Fona specimens are known, and her contributions to fossil conservation.

== Classification ==
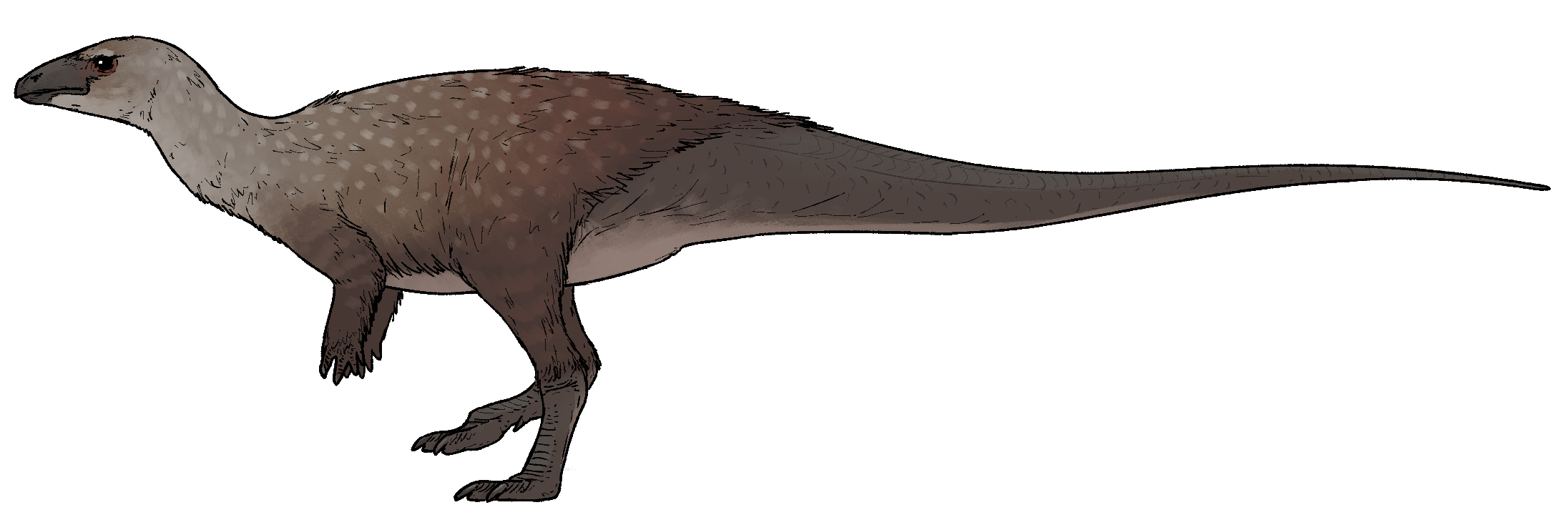
Life restoration

In their phylogenetic analyses, Avrahami et al. (2024) recovered Fona as a basal member of the Thescelosaurinae within the Thescelosauridae. The temporally and geographically close Oryctodromeus was consistently recovered as a close relative, followed by all three latest Cretaceous species of Thescelosaurus. The exact relationships of thescelosaurines depended on whether the analysis was time-calibrated. If it was not, Fona and Oryctodromeus were recovered in a clade as the sister taxon to Thescelosaurus. If it was time-calibrated, Oryctodromeus was found as the next diverging member of the Thescelosaurinae after Fona, followed by Thescelosaurus. In their 2026 description of the skull of Fona, Avrahami & Zanno conducted an updated phylogenetic analysis incorporating revised scorings based on new observations. Their time-calibrated Bayesian results are displayed in the cladogram below:

- - - - Micropachycephalosaurus
      - Yueosaurus
    - - Hypsilophodon
      - - Gideonmantellia
        - Parksosaurus
  - - - Changmiania
      - Othnielosaurus
    - Thescelosauridae
      - Orodrominae
        - Diluvicursor
        - - Zephyrosaurus
          - - Kaiparowits Fm. taxon
            - Orodromeus
      - Thescelosaurinae
        - Jeholosaurus
        - - Changchunsaurus
          - - - Haya
              - Koreanosaurus
            - - Fona
              - - Oryctodromeus
                - - Thescelosaurus assiniboiensis
                  - - Thescelosaurus garbanii
                    - Thescelosaurus neglectus
