= Hahnodon =

Hahnodon Temporal range: 145–139 Ma

Scientific classification
- Domain: Eukaryota
- Kingdom: Animalia
- Phylum: Chordata
- Clade: Synapsida
- Clade: Therapsida
- Clade: Cynodontia
- Clade: Mammaliaformes
- Order: †Haramiyida
- Family: †Hahnodontidae
- Genus: †Hahnodon; Sigogneau-Russell, 1991
- Species: †H. taqueti

Binomial name
- †Hahnodon taqueti Sigogneau-Russell, 1991

Extinct genus of mammaliaforms

Hahnodon ("Hahn's tooth") is an extinct genus of mammaliaforms from the Early Cretaceous Ksar Metlili Formation in Morocco. Although originally considered to be a relatively early member of the extinct clade Multituberculata, recent studies indicate that it instead is a haramiyid.

== Fossils and distribution ==
Hahnodon taqueti is based on a single lower molar found in Lower Cretaceous strata in Morocco.

== Classification ==
Denise Sigogneau-Russell (1991) classified Hahnodon as a member of Multituberculata, but others later considered it to be related to members of Haramiyida. The description of Cifelliodon from North America confirmed that Hahnodon — and by extension, Hahnodontidae — belong to Haramiyida.
