= Tingitana anoualae =

Tingitana anoualae Temporal range: Early Cretaceous, ?Berriasian

Scientific classification
- Kingdom: Animalia
- Phylum: Chordata
- Class: Reptilia
- Order: Rhynchocephalia
- Clade: Neosphenodontia
- Genus: †Tingitana; Evans & Sigogneau-Russell, 1997
- Species: †T. anoualae

Binomial name
- †Tingitana anoualae Evans & Sigogneau-Russell, 1997

Extinct reptile genus

Tingitana anoualae is an extinct species of sphenodontian reptile, known from Early Cretaceous (Berriasian age) rocks of the Ksar Metlili Formation in the High Atlas of Morocco. It is the only species in the genus Tingitana, known from a left dentary (lower jaw bone) and partial left maxilla (upper jaw bone), both belonging to juvenile individuals.
