= Mitredon =

Mitredon Temporal range: Rhaetian ~205.6–201.6 Ma

Scientific classification
- Domain: Eukaryota
- Kingdom: Animalia
- Phylum: Chordata
- Clade: Synapsida
- Clade: Therapsida
- Clade: Cynodontia
- Family: incertae sedis
- Genus: †Mitredon; Shapiro & Jenkins, 2001
- Species: †M. cromptoni

Binomial name
- †Mitredon cromptoni Shapiro & Jenkins, 2001

Extinct genus of cynodonts

Mitredon is an extinct genus of cynodonts which existed in the Fleming Fjord Formation of Greenland during the Rhaetian age of the Late Triassic epoch. The type and only species is Mitredon cromptoni.

== Description ==
Mitredon is known only from a single holotype specimen, MGUH VP 3392, which consists of a partial dentary bone preserving several incomplete postcanine teeth. These teeth have fully divided roots, a feature shared with Sinoconodon and the mammaliaforms, but the teeth of Mitredon are distinguished from these by possessing compressed and recurved cusps akin to those of the chiniquodontids.
