= Elkhead Mountains =

Mountain range in Colorado, US

The Elkhead Mountains are a mountain range in Colorado. The mountain range is considered to be low altitude within Colorado as all of the peaks are under 11,000 feet (3,400 m). Located within Routt and Moffat counties, the Elkhead Mountains are far from metropolitan areas and have few lakes and streams, so they attract relatively few visitors.

The mountain range is of volcanic origin and all of the peaks were formed by volcanic action. The mountain range extends approximately 16 miles (26 km) east to west and 10 miles (16 km) north to south, and its center is located at 40.77404°N 107.32132°W, approximately 20 miles (32 km) northeast of Craig and north of Hayden, Colorado, 13 miles (21 km) south of the Wyoming border. Almost all of the peaks within the Elkhead Mountains are a part of Routt National Forest. Significant peaks include Bears Ears, Sugar Loaf, Saddle Mountain, Black Mountain, Cedar Mountain, Pilot Knob, and Meaden Peak.

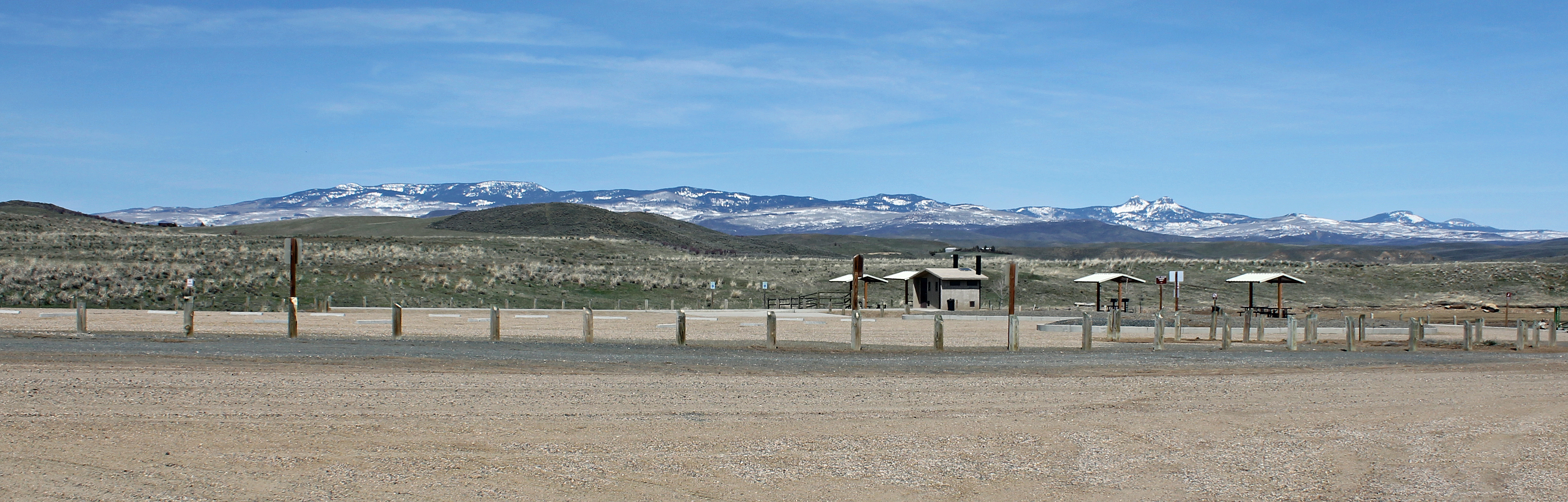
The Elkhead Mountains

== See also ==
- Park Range (Colorado)
- Mountain ranges of Colorado
