= Cedar Mountain Formation =

Geologic formation in the United States

- Stratigraphic range: middle Berriasian-earliest Cenomanian; ~140–98.37 Ma
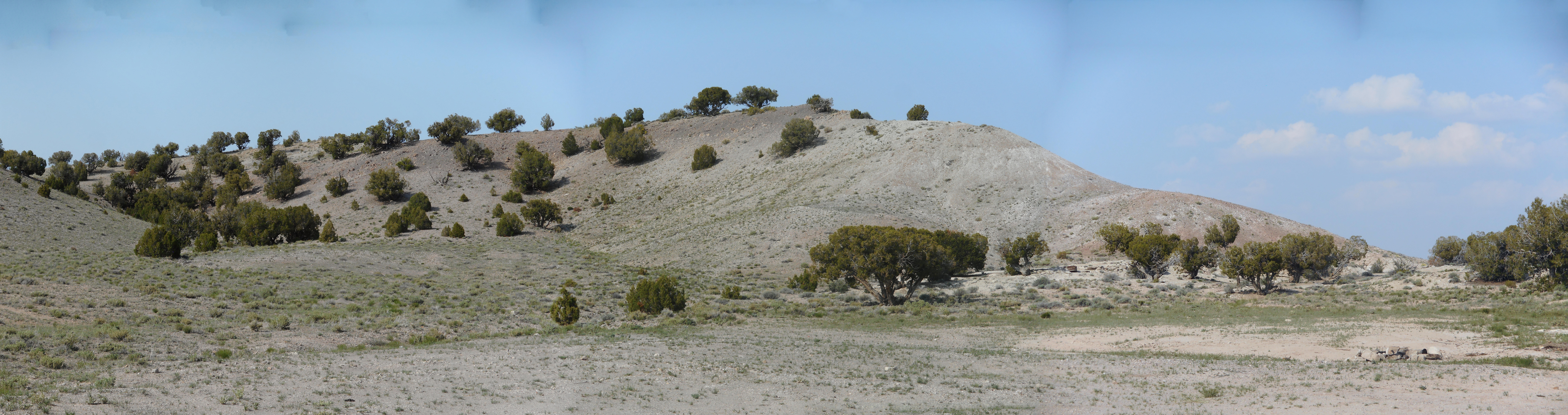
- Type section of the Cedar Mountain Formation
- Type: Geological formation
- Sub-units: See text
- Underlies: Naturita Formation
- Overlies: Morrison Formation
- Thickness: Varies, some sections over 1000 metres

Lithology
- Primary: Conglomerate, sandstone, mudstone

Location
- Coordinates: 39.250°N 110.824°W
- Approximate paleocoordinates: 40.2°N 69.0°W
- Region: Utah
- Country: United States

Type section
- Named for: Cedar Mountain
- Named by: William Stokes
- Year defined: 1944
- Cedar Mountain Formation (the United States) Cedar Mountain Formation (Utah)

The Cedar Mountain Formation is the name given to a distinctive sedimentary geologic formation in eastern Utah, spanning most of the early and mid-Cretaceous. The formation was named for Cedar Mountain in northern Emery County, Utah, where William Lee Stokes first studied the exposures in 1944.

== Geology ==
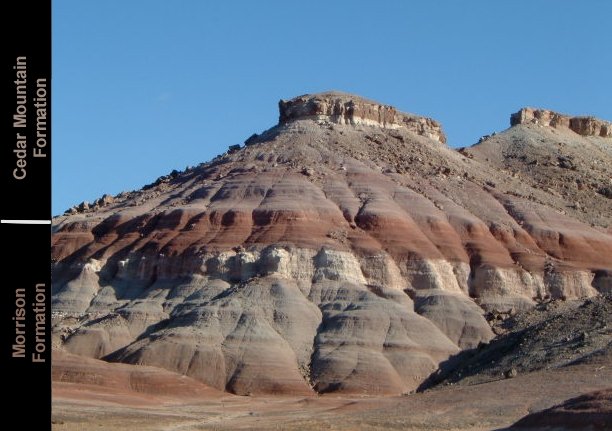
The drab-colored lower portion of the Cedar Mountain Formation, overlying the brighter Morrison Formation.

The formation occurs between the underlying Morrison Formation and overlying Naturita Formation (sometimes formerly called the Dakota Formation).

It is composed of non-marine sediments, that is, sediments deposited in rivers, lakes and on flood plains. Based on various fossils and radiometric dates, the Cedar Mountain Formation was deposited during the Early Cretaceous Epoch, about 140 - 94 million years ago (mya).

It has lithography similar to the Burro Canyon Formation in the region.

Dinosaur fossils occur throughout the formation, but their study has only occurred since the early 1990s. The dinosaurs in the lower part of the formation differ from those in the upper part. These two dinosaur assemblages, characterized by distinct dinosaurs, show the replacement of older, European-like dinosaurs with younger, Asian-like dinosaurs as the North American Continental Plate drifted westward. A middle dinosaur assemblage may be present, but the fossil record is not clear.

=== Stratigraphy ===
The Cedar Mountain Formation is sandwiched between the Morrison Formation below and the Naturita Formation and Mancos Shale above. The youngest date for Morrison just below the Cedar Mountain Formation is 135.10 ± 0.30 Ma or Berriasian–Valanginian. The Jurassic-Cretaceous boundary in western North America is marked by an unconformity of variable length, and typically signifies 10-49 million years of missing geologic time. This boundary between the Morrison and Cedar Mountain is commonly marked by a horizon of carbonate nodules or by highly polished pebbles that are allegedly gastroliths.

Although not part of the Cedar Mountain Formation, the Naturita Formation immediately overlies the Cedar Mountain and marks the encroaching Western Interior Seaway. The Naturita is not uniformly distributed and was eroded away in places by the advancing Seaway so that the marine shales of the Mancos Formation lay directly on the Mussentuchit Member or its equivalent. The name Dakota Formation has been improperly used for these strata.

==== Formation members ====
Only recently did the 125 m (410 ft) thick formation get subdivided into smaller, distinctive beds called members. There is a debate as to whether there are five members or four depending whether the Buckhorn Conglomerate is considered to be at the top of the Morrison Formation or at the base of the Cedar Mountain Formation; most geologists and paleontologists consider it part of the Cedar Mountain Formation. In ascending order the remaining members are the Yellow Cat Member, Poison Strip Sandstone, Ruby Ranch Member, and the Mussentuchit Member. Each of these members are named after a geographic area where they were first studied.

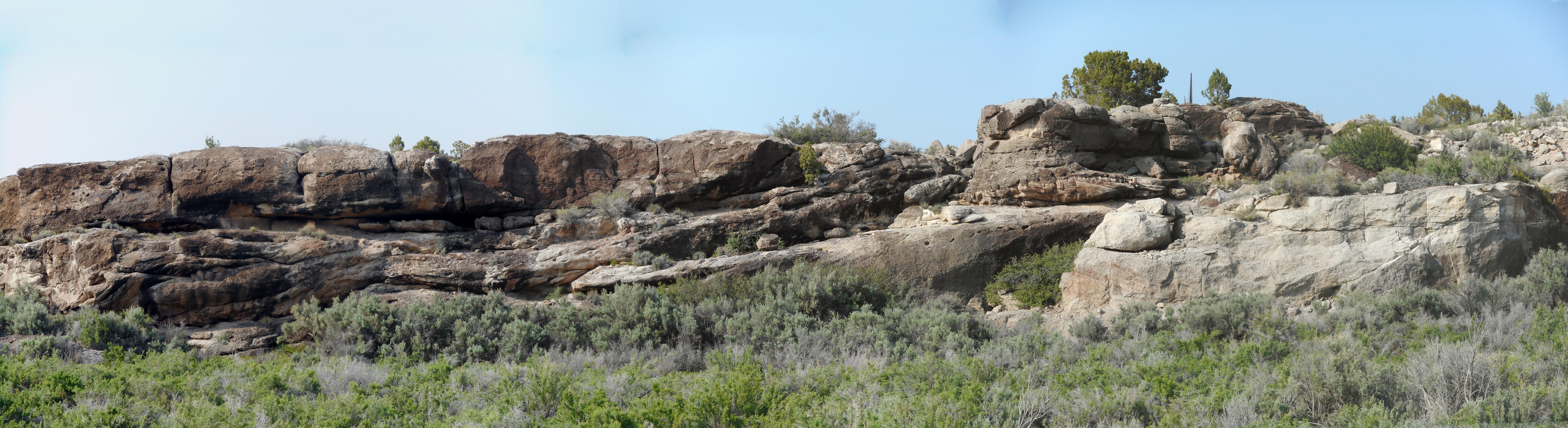
Type section of the Buckhorn Conglomerate western side of Cedar Mountain, Emery County, Utah.

- The Buckhorn Conglomerate is considered the lowermost member of the Cedar Mountain Formation in the region of the San Raphael Swell by Stokes. It is named for exposures near Buckhorn Reservoir near Cedar Mountain. Its position immediately below the Ruby Ranch Member suggests that it may be equivalent to the channel sandstones in the Yellow Cat Member and the Poison Strip Sandstone farther to the east. This idea is strengthened by the similar composition of the gravels in these members, but a direct correlation has not yet been established.
- The Yellow Cat Member is named for exposures near the Yellow Cat mining area north of Arches National Park. It is limited to the eastern portions of the formation and is thickest near Arches National Monument. The member is composed of drab greyish mudstones and some lenses of sandstone. The mudstones were deposited on flood plains, and show evidence of ancient soil development called paleosols. The mudstones originated as flood deposits from river channels that are marked by the sandstone lenses. Formerly considered Barremian, the latest chemostratigraphic and geochronological studies conclude that the Yellow Member is older, with deposition occurring Berriasian–Valanginian stages.
- The Poison Strip Sandstone was named for prominent, cliff-forming sandstones in the Poison Strip uranium district north of Arches National Monument. It is actually a series of sandstones that were deposited in river channels, and lesser amounts of mudstones and limestones that were deposited on the floodplain and in small ponds. The Poison Strip Sandstone may represent a meandering river complex. Based on the position of the Poison Strip between the Yellow Cat and Ruby Ranch members, it probably was latest Barremian to earliest Aptian. Carbonate growths appear on bones in the quarry from which Venenosaurus was extracted.
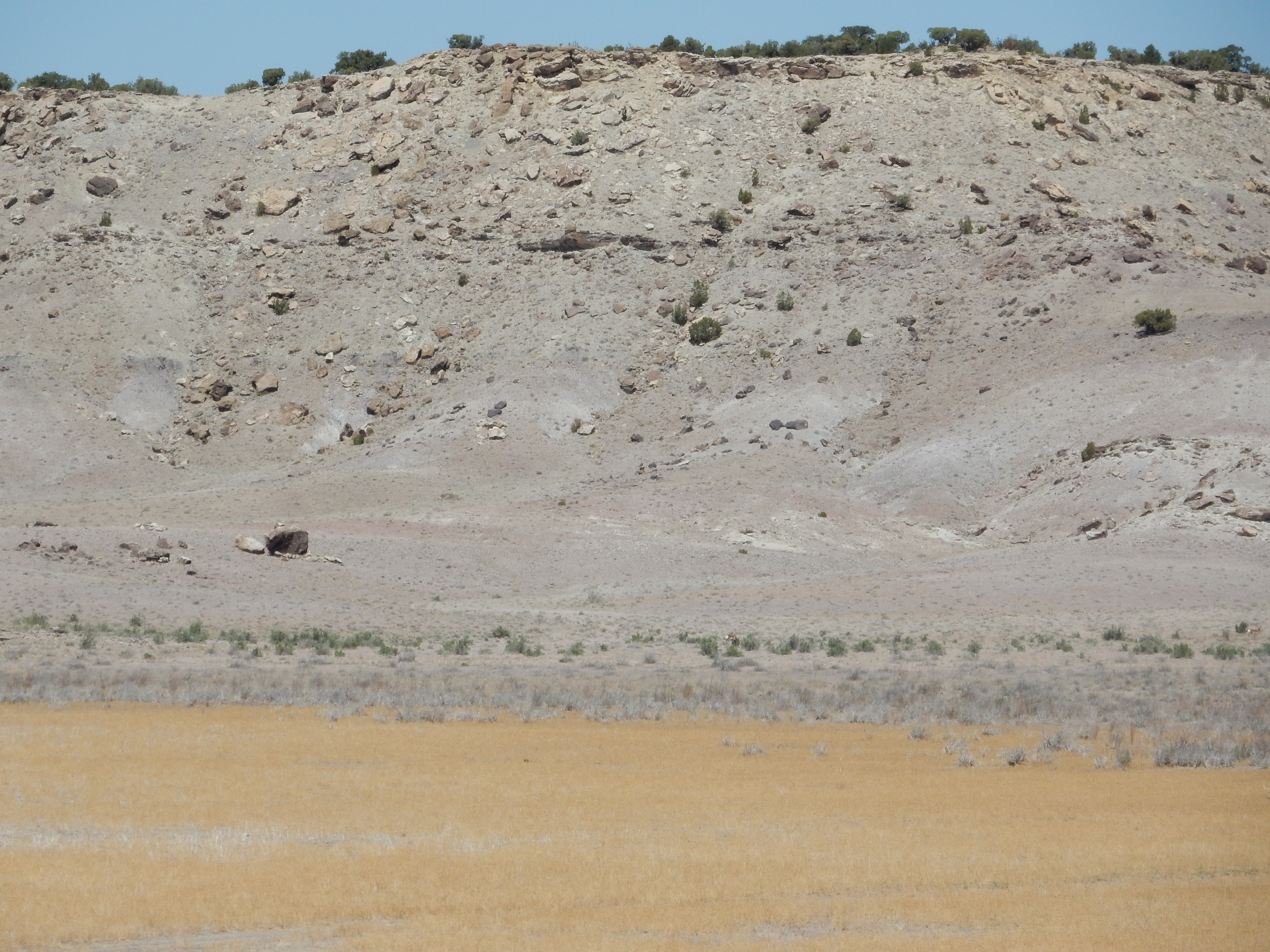
  - This image shows the Cedar Mountain Formation near its type section at Buckhorn Reservoir, Utah. The formation is capped by a very thin bed of Naturita Formation. The Cedar Mountain Formation is an Early Cretaceous fluvial formation, that was deposited in the foreland basin of the Sevier Mountains just before it was flooded by the ocean to form the Western Interior Seaway.
    The Poison Strip Sandstone was the source of Tony's Bone Bed, a significant concentration of dinosaur bones. Before it was discovered, only possible Sauropelta remains and the isolated bones of sauropods and theropods had been recovered from the Poison Strip member. Volunteers from the Denver Museum of Natural History discovered Tony's Bone Bed in 1998, 3.75m below the top of the member. The quality of the preserved remains in Tony's Bone Bed are "highly variable". The condition of many of its fossils suggest the deposit accumulated gradually. Many of the bones seem to have been trampled before burial, and some of the ends of bones are missing and were likely removed by scavengers. None of the bones were preserved articulated with each other. All of this suggests a significant period of time between the deaths of the animals and their final entombment. Tony's Bonebed probably accumulated over time when the water in the river channel was low during the dry season.

- The Ruby Ranch Member is the most widespread and distinctive member of the Cedar Mountain. It was named for exposures on the Ruby Ranch located southeast of Green River, Utah. The member is composed of maroon mudstones with irregular spheres of carbonate nodules. The nodules formed in ancient soils that developed in the mud deposited on the flood plain in a strongly seasonal, semiarid climate. Evaporation of groundwater during the dry season concentrated calcium carbonate and other minerals in the upper parts of the soil horizon. Radiometric dates place the upper portions of the Ruby Ranch in the late Aptian. Exhumed river channels in the Ruby Ranch indicate that stream flow during the Aptian was towards the northeast, the direction of the encroaching Western Interior Seaway.
- The Mussentuchit Member is the uppermost member of the Cedar Mountain Formation. It was named for exposures along Mussentuchit Wash southwest of the San Rafael Swell. It is predominantly composed of grey mudstones high in organic carbon from fossil plant material, as well as volcanic ash. The mudstones were originally deposited on a broad coastal plain with a high water table or with abundant rainfall. Thus, carbonate nodules are rare. A radiometric date of 98.37 ± 0.07 Ma places the upper part of the member in the Lower Cenomanian, while lower portions of the member have been dated to 104.46 ± 0.95 Ma, in the Albian stage.

== Fossil content ==
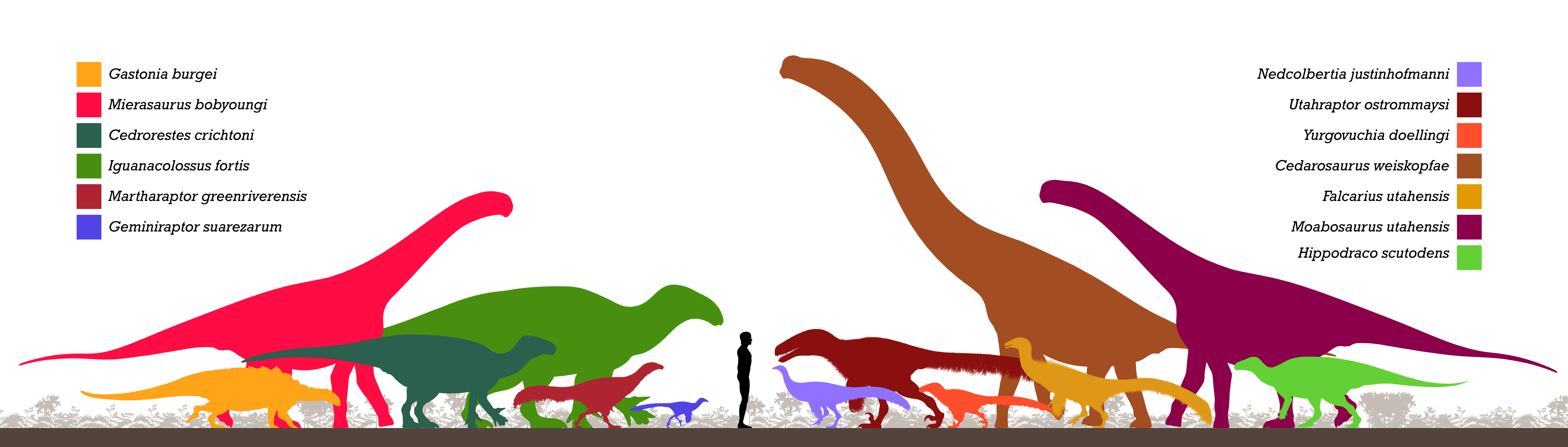
Fauna of Yellow Cat Member from the Cedar Mountain Formation

The Cedar Mountain Formation is proving to contain one of the world's richest and most diverse Early Cretaceous dinosaur faunas. The discoveries to date have revealed that the origin of some of the later Cretaceous dinosaurs may lie in Cedar Mountain, but further work is needed to understand the timing and effects the changing position of the North American Plate had on dinosaurian evolution. Also needed is a better understanding of the effects that the changing North American Plate had on the non-dinosaur vertebrates.

=== Dinosaurs ===
The Cedar Mountain Formation is one of the last major dinosaur-bearing formations to be studied in the United States. Although sporadic bone fragments were known before 1990, serious research did not begin until that year. Since then, several organizations have conducted fieldwork collecting dinosaurs, chiefly the Oklahoma Museum of Natural History, the Denver Museum of Nature & Science, Utah State University Eastern (formerly College of Eastern Utah), the Utah Geological Survey, Brigham Young University, and Dinosaur National Monument staff. This research indicates that the formation contains at least two, possibly three, dinosaur assemblages.

The oldest assemblage comes from the Yellow Cat, Poison Strip, and basal Ruby Ranch members. The small, Ornitholestes-like ornithomimosaurian theropod Nedcolbertia and the brachiosaurid sauropod Cedarosaurus may be considered relics, with their closest relatives in the Morrison Formation. In contrast, the polacanthine nodosaurid Gastonia and a yet unnamed iguanodontid are similar to related forms from the Lower Cretaceous of southern England. These dinosaurs show that the connection between North America and Europe still existed during the Barremian. All of this changes, however, with the upper dinosaur assemblage from the top of the Ruby Ranch and Mussentuchit members. This upper assemblage shows greater similarities with Asian dinosaur assemblages from the same time. The upper assemblage also has a tyrannosauroid, a ceratopsian, and a pachycephalosaur. Although not a dinosaur, the primitive mammal Gobiconodon is known from both Mongolia and the Mussentuchit Member. Evidence for a middle dinosaur assemblage between the older and younger ones is controversial because the evidence mostly depends on a single specimen of the ornithopod Tenontosaurus from high in the Ruby Ranch Member and the sauropod Astrodon from low in the Ruby Ranch. Regardless, the upper and lower dinosaur assemblages in the Cedar Mountain Formation document the separation of North America and Europe, the westward drift of North America, and its connection with Asia 10 to 15 million years later.

Data from Carpenter (2006), Cifelli et al. (1999), Kirkland and Madsen (2007), and The Paleobiology Database.

Color key: Taxon / Reclassified taxon / Taxon falsely reported as present / Dubious taxon or junior synonym / Ichnotaxon / Ootaxon / Morphotaxon

Notes
Uncertain or tentative taxa are in small text
~~crossed out~~ taxa are discredited.

==== Ankylosaurs ====
Ankylosaurs reported from the Cedar Mountain Formation
Genus	Species	Location	Member	Material	Notes	Images
Animantarx	A. ramaljonesi		Mussentuchit Member	A partial skull and right mandible, cervical vertebrae, dorsal vertebrae, ribs, scapulacoracoids, fragment of sternal plate, humerus, left ilium with ischium, and femur.	A panoplosaurin nodosaurine	
Cedarpelta	C. bilbeyhallorum		Mussentuchit Member	[Two] skulls, cervical vertebrae, dorsal vertebrae, synsacrum, caudal vertebrae, humeri, ulna, ischium, partial right ischium, fragments of the right ilium, cervical ribs, metacarpals, phalanges, unguals, coracoid, femur, tibia, and osteoderms.	A ankylosaurid ankylosaur.	
Gastonia	G. burgei		Upper Yellow Cat Member	A skull, maxillary tooth, ischium, caudal vertebrae, scapulocoracoid, scapula, ilium, femurs, ulna, humerus, tibia, anterior dorsal vertebra, caudal spines, shoulder spines, caudal plates, osteoderms, and portions of sacral shield.	A polacanthine nodosaurid.	
Gastonia	G. lorriemcwhinneyae		Poison Strip Member	A skull roof, braincase, partial cranium, quadrate, cervical vertebrae, dorsal vertebrae, dorsal rib, synsacrum, caudal vertebrae, chevrons, scapulocoracoid, scapulae, coracoid, humerus, ulna, ilia, ischium, ischia, pubis, femur, fibula, tibia, and osteoderms.	A polacanthine nodosaurid.	
Peloroplites	P. cedrimontanus		Mussentuchit Member	A partial skull, cervical vertebrae, dorsal vertebrae, synsacrum, caudal vertebrae, chevron, scapulacoracoids, humeri, radii, ulnae, ilia, pubis, ischium, femora, tibiae, fibula, metacarpals, metatarsal, metapodials, phalanges, unguals, osteoderms, and fragments.	A polacanthine nodosaurid.	
cf. Sauropelta	Indeterminate		Poison Strip Member	Caudal vertebrae, dorsal vertebrae, ribs, and osteoderms.	cf. Sauropelta sp. may, instead, represent a large polacanthine.	

==== Neornithischians ====
A large sail-backed iguanodont represented by large vertebrae and fragmentary remains from the Upper Yellow Cat Member.

Neornithischians reported from the Cedar Mountain Formation
Genus	Species	Location	Member	Material	Notes	Images
Cedrorestes	C. crichtoni		Upper Yellow Cat Member	Fragments of ribs, fused sacrum, ilium, preacetabular process of an ilium, tibia, metatarsal, and ossified tendons.	A basal styracosternan iguanoontian.	
Eolambia	E. caroljonesa		Mussentuchit Member	Predentaries, dentaries, surangulars, premaxillae, nasal, maxillae, jugals, postorbitals, quadrates, spuamosal, braincases, frontals, parietal, supraoccipital, opisthotic-exoccipital, prootic, laterosphenoid, parasphenoid-basisphenoid, basioccipital, cervical vertebrae, dorsal vertebrae, caudal vertebrae, cervical ribs, dorsal ribs, sacral vertebrae, chevrons, sternal, scapula, coracoid, humerus, ulna, radius, metacarpals, manual phalanges, ilium, pubis, ischium, femur, tibia, fibula, tarsus, metatarsals, and pedal phalanges.	A basal hadrosauromorph ornithopod.	Eolambia
Fona	F. herzogae		Mussentuchit Member	Multiple fairly complete, partially articulated skeletons including cranial material	A thescelosaurine thescelosaurid.	Fona
Hippodraco	H. scutodens		Upper Yellow Cat Member	Partial skull, cervical vertebrae, dorsal vertebrae, dorsal rib, partial sacrum, sternal, scapula, humerus, ischium, femur, tibia, astragalus, calcaneum, distal tarsal, phalanxes, and metatarsals.	A basal styracosternan iguanodontian.	Hippodraco
Iani	I. smithi		Lower Mussentuchit Member	A nearly complete, disarticulated skull, cervical, dorsal, sacral, and caudal vertebrae, ribs and haemal arches, partial pectoral and pelvic girdles, and the right arm and leg.	A basal tenontosaurid rhabdodontomorph.	
Iguanacolossus	I. fortis		Lower Yellow Cat Member	Partial dentary, maxilla, squamosal, quadrates, axial neural arch, dorsal vertebrae, dorsal rib, caudal vertebrae, chevrons, scapula, ilium, pubis, fibula, and metatarsals.	A basal styracosternan iguanodontian.	
Iguanodon	I. ottingeri		Yellow Cat Member	An upper jaw fragment and two teeth.	A dubious taxon.	
Planicoxa	P. venenica		Poison Strip Member	An ilium, cervical neural arch, dorsal vertebral arches, dorsal centra, dorsal rib fragments, sacral vertebra, caudal centra, humerus, ulna, femora, tibiae, metatarsal, and pedal phalanx	A basal styracosternan iguanodontian.	Planicoxa
Spheroolithus	S. europaeus		Mussentuchit Member	One eggshell fragment.	A spheroolithid egg of uncertain parentage, possibly laid by a hadrosauroid.	
Spheroolithus	S. albertensis		Mussentuchit Member.	Two eggshell fragments.	A spheroolithid egg of uncertain parentage, possibly laid by a hadrosauroid.	
Tenontosaurus	Indeterminate		Lower Ruby Ranch Member	Various partial specimens.	Teeth attributed to this genus have also been found in the Upper Ruby Ranch Member and the Mussentuchit Member.	

==== Sauropods ====
Sauropods reported from the Cedar Mountain Formation
Genus	Species	Location	Member	Material	Notes	Images
Abydosaurus	A. mcintoshi		Mussentuchit Member	[Two] nearly complete skulls, braincase with a partial skull roof, cervical vertebrae, partial pelvis and sacrum with articulated caudal vertebrae, scapula, humerus, and metacarpus.	A brachiosaurid sauropod.	Abydosaurus Cedarosaurus Mierasaurus Moabosaurus
cf. Astrodon	Indeterminate		Ruby Ranch Member.			Abydosaurus Cedarosaurus Mierasaurus Moabosaurus
Brontomerus	B. mcintoshi		Ruby Ranch Member, and possibly the upper Yellow Cat Member	An ilium, crushed presacral centrum, mid-to-posterior caudal vertebra, partial distal caudal centrum, anterior dorsal rib, nearly complete scapula missing anterior portion, partial sternal plates, and other fragments.	A somphospondylian sauropod.	Abydosaurus Cedarosaurus Mierasaurus Moabosaurus
Cedarosaurus	C. weiskopfae		Upper Yellow Cat Member, and possibly also the lower Yellow Cat Member	Articulated dorsal vertebrae, caudal vertebrae, chevrons, proximal portions of the scapulae, coracoids, sternal plates, right humerus, radius and ulna, metacarpal IV, right pubis, partial pubis, proximal portions of ischia, partial femurs, tibia, metatarsals, phalanx, unguals, ribs, and numerous gastroliths.	A brachiosaurid sauropod.	Abydosaurus Cedarosaurus Mierasaurus Moabosaurus
Mierasaurus	M. bobyoungi		Lower Yellow Cat Member	A partial skull and jaw, teeth, cervical vertebrae, cervical ribs, dorsal vertebrae, dorsal ribs, sacral ribs, caudal vertebrae, chevrons, scapulae, radius, ulna, manus, complete pelvic elements, femora, tibia, fibula, astragalus pes, a possible juvenile dentary, and juvenile femur.	One of the last-surviving members of turiasauria.	Abydosaurus Cedarosaurus Mierasaurus Moabosaurus
Moabosaurus	M. utahensis		Upper Yellow Cat Member	[Eighteen] braincases, premaxillas, maxillas, dentaries, postorbital, quadrate, cervical vertebrae, dorsal vertebrae, caudal vertebrae, cervical ribs, ribs, sacrum, sternal plate, humerus, ulna and femur.	One of the last-surviving members of turiasauria.	Abydosaurus Cedarosaurus Mierasaurus Moabosaurus
Venenosaurus	V. dicrocei		Poison Strip Member	Disarticulated caudal vertebrae, scapula, radius, ulna, metacarpals, manus phalanges, pubis, ischium, metatarsals, astragalus, chevrons, and ribs.	A brachiosaurid sauropod.	Abydosaurus Cedarosaurus Mierasaurus Moabosaurus

==== Theropods ====
Indeterminate allosauroid material present in the Lower Yellow Cat, Upper Yellow Cat and Ruby Ranch Members. Indeterminate dromaeosaurine present in the Mussentuchit Member. Indeterminate remains of a 3m deinonychosaurian present in the Mussentuchit member. Indeterminate velociraptorine remains present in the Mussentuchit Member. Indeterminate troodontid remains present in the Mussentuchit Member. Indeterminate therizinosaurid remains present in the Mussentuchit Member. Indeterminate dromaeosaurine remains present in the Mussentuchit Member. Possible indeterminate hesperornithiformes present in the Mussentuchit Member.

Theropods reported from the Cedar Mountain Formation
Genus	Species	Location	Member	Material	Notes	Images
Acrocanthosaurus	A. atokensis		Ruby Ranch Member.	An isolated tooth.	A carcharodontosaurid theropod.	Deinonychus Falcarius Moros Nedcolbertia Siats Utahraptor
Continuoolithus	C. canadensis		Mussentuchit Member.	Several eggshell pieces	Likely an elongatoolithid, probably laid by a small oviraptorosaur.	Deinonychus Falcarius Moros Nedcolbertia Siats Utahraptor
Deinonychus	Indeterminate		Mussentuchit Member.			Deinonychus Falcarius Moros Nedcolbertia Siats Utahraptor
Falcarius	F. suarezarum		Lower Yellow Cat Member.	A maxilla (holotype) and several cranial and postcranial remains	A basal therizinosaur theropod. F. suarezarum was originally placed in the distinct genus Geminiraptor and identified as a troodontid.	Deinonychus Falcarius Moros Nedcolbertia Siats Utahraptor
Falcarius	F. utahensis		Lower Yellow Cat Member.	Numerous elements belonging to immature and mature individuals.	A basal therizinosaur theropod. F. suarezarum was originally placed in the distinct genus Geminiraptor and identified as a troodontid.	Deinonychus Falcarius Moros Nedcolbertia Siats Utahraptor
Martharaptor	M. greenriverensis		Upper Yellow Cat Member.	A cervical neural arch, cranial dorsal vertebra, distal caudal centrum, ulna?, radius, scapula, ischium, distal pubis?, metacarpal, manual phalanxes, manual unguals, metatarsals, pedal phalanxes and pedal unguals.	A possible therizinosauroid therizinosaur.	Deinonychus Falcarius Moros Nedcolbertia Siats Utahraptor
Moros	M. intrepidus		Mussentuchit Member.	Portions of the femur, tibia, metatarsals and phalanges.	A pantyrannosaurian tyrannosauroid.	Deinonychus Falcarius Moros Nedcolbertia Siats Utahraptor
Nedcolbertia	N. justinhofmanni		Upper Yellow Cat Member.	"Partial skeletons of [three] individuals."	A basal ornithomimosaurian theropod.	Deinonychus Falcarius Moros Nedcolbertia Siats Utahraptor
cf. Richardoestesia	Indeterminate		Mussentuchit Member.	Teeth.	An indeterminate coelurosaur.	Deinonychus Falcarius Moros Nedcolbertia Siats Utahraptor
Siats	S. meekerorum		Mussentuchit Member.	Dorsal vertebrae, partial ilium and ischium, partial fibula, caudal vertebrae, a chevron, a pedal phalanx and several indeterminate bone fragments.	A megaraptorid theropod.	Deinonychus Falcarius Moros Nedcolbertia Siats Utahraptor
Undulatoolithus	U. pengi		Mussentuchit Member.	One eggshell fragment	A elongatoolithid, probably laid by an oviraptorosaur.	Deinonychus Falcarius Moros Nedcolbertia Siats Utahraptor
Utahraptor	U. ostrommaysi		Upper Yellow Cat Member.	Pedal unguals, tibia, femur, premaxillae, nasal, quadratojugal, caudal vertebrae, cervical vertebrae, dorsal vertebrae, sacral vertebrae, proximal caudal vertebrae, coracoid, partial ilium, incomplete ischium, femora, astragalus, metatarsal, phalanxes and undescribed material.	A dromaeosaurine dromaeosaurid.	Deinonychus Falcarius Moros Nedcolbertia Siats Utahraptor
Utahraptor	Indeterminate		Poison Strip Member.	Pelvic element?		Deinonychus Falcarius Moros Nedcolbertia Siats Utahraptor
Yurgovuchia	Y. doellingi		Lower Yellow Cat Member.	Cervical vertebrae, dorsal vertebrae, caudal vertebrae, and the proximal end of a pubis.	A dromaeosaurine dromaeosaurid.	Deinonychus Falcarius Moros Nedcolbertia Siats Utahraptor
Allosauroidea indet.	Indeterminate		Upper Yellow Cat Member	Teeth, vertebrae and ribs	Large indeterminate allosauroids (~10m~).	Deinonychus Falcarius Moros Nedcolbertia Siats Utahraptor
Caenagnathidae Indet.	Indeterminate		Mussentuchit Member.		A giant caenagnathid oviraptorosaur.	Deinonychus Falcarius Moros Nedcolbertia Siats Utahraptor

=== Other vertebrate fossils ===
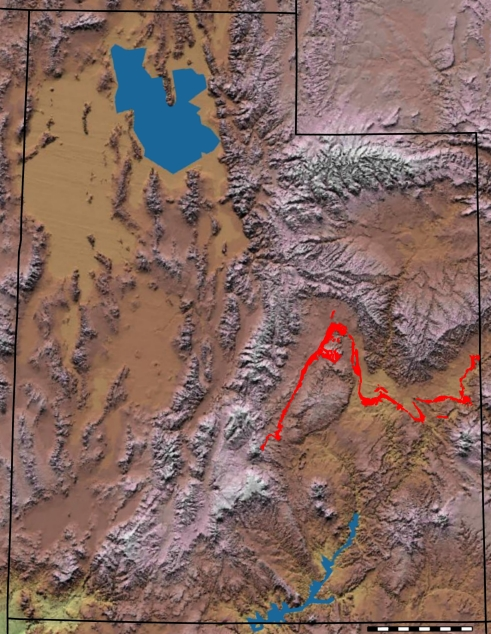
Map of Utah showing the location of the Cedar Mountain Formation (red). The San Rafael Swell is the dome-like structure that the formation jogs around. Base map data courtesy of geodata.gov

Besides dinosaurs, the Cedar Mountain Formation has produced a wealth of small fossils and microfossils, mostly teeth from a variety of vertebrates. Most of these specimens have been found in the Mussentuchit Member where they are collected by washing the rock through fine window screen. The teeth and other small fossils are picked from the residue.

- Fish include primitive fresh or brackish water sharks (e.g., Hybodus) and rays (cf., Ischyrhiza), the lungfish (Ceratodus) and several bony fishes known from vertebrae. Lungfish are able to breathe air when pond water becomes poorly oxygenated, such as during the dry season.
- Amphibians include both salamanders (e.g. Albanerpeton) and frogs, but neither is common.
- Reptiles are more abundant and better studied. These include aquatic turtles (Glyptops, Naomichelys), at least one type of snake (Coniophis), and several different lizards, including teiids (Bicuspidon), possible skinks and some extinct families (e.g., Paramacellodidae). Crocodiles are also present but their remains are fragmentary. They include Bernissartia, an unnamed atoposaurid, and unnamed pholidosaurid. At least one fragment of a large pterosaur is known from the base of the Mussentuchut Member. Unfortunately, it is too incomplete to identify to family or genus.
- Bird remains are very fragmentary because of their delicate structure. At least one aquatic bird is known. Based on the diversity of birds from the Early Cretaceous of China, other birds were probably present in Utah at this time as well.
- Mammals are the most thoroughly studied thanks to the work of Jeffrey Eaton and Richard Cifelli. They include triconodonts (e.g., Astroconodon), which have the molar cusps arranged in a single row; symmetrodonts (e.g., Spalacolestes; Spalacotheridium), characterized by molars having three cusps arranged in a triangle; multituberculates (e.g., Janumys; Cedaromys; Paracimexomys), with their multiple rows of cusps on the molars; one of the earliest marsupials (Kokopellia), and several unnamed tribotheres, characterized by molars having three cusps that are typically asymmetrically arranged.

The various vertebrates are listed by member in the list below.

Non-vertebrate fossils are more widely distributed in the Cedar Mountain Formation. These include the distinctive reproductive structures of fresh water algae that are called charophytes. Charophytes are so distinctive that they are used to correlate strata of similar age, and thus were used to show that the Yellow Cat Member was time equivalent to Barremian age strata in England. Ostracods, small crustaceans with clam-like shells, also occur in fresh water deposits, along with "finger-clams" or conchostracans. Pollen have been found in the Mussentuchit Member and are important for reconstructing the environment. In a few places, large petrified logs are known, especially from the Poison Strip. These conifer logs are over a meter in diameter and indicate the presence of trees over 30 m (100 feet). The distinct wood of the tree fern Tempskya is occasional found as well.

Data from Carpenter (2006), Cifelli et al. (1999), Kirkland and Madsen (2007), and The Paleobiology Database.

==== Other reptiles ====
Indeterminate isolated pterosaur remains have been recovered from the Yellow Cat and Mussentuchit Members.

A partial neochoristodere femur is known from the Yellow Cat Member.

The egg taxon Mycomorphoolithus, possibly laid by a large non-eusuchian crocodylomorph, is a Mussentuchit Member.

===== Crurotarsans =====
Indeterminate crocodilian remains present in the Yellow Cat and Ruby Ranch Members. Indeterminate pholidosaurid remains present in the Mussentuchit Member. Indeterminate atoposaurid remains present in the Mussentuchit Member.

Crurotarsans of the Cedar Mountain Formation
Genus	Species	Location	Member	Abundance	Description	Images
cf. Bernissartia	cf. Bernissartia sp.		Mussentuchit Member			Bernissartia
Dakotasuchus	Dakotasuchus kingi		Mussentuchit Member.			Bernissartia

===== Lepidosaurs =====
Lepidosaurs of the Cedar Mountain Formation
Genus	Species	Location	Member	Abundance	Description	Images
Toxolophosaurus	Toxolophosaurus sp.		Yellow Cat Member.			
Harmodontosaurus	Harmodontosaurus emeryensis		Mussentuchit Member.			
Dimekodontosaurus	Dimekodontosaurus madseni		Mussentuchit Member.			
Dicothodon	Dicothodon moorensis		Mussentuchit Member.			
Pseudosaurillus	Pseudosaurillus sp.		Mussentuchit Member.			
Bicuspidon	Bicuspidon numerosus		Mussentuchit Member.			
Bothriagenys	Bothriagenys mysterion		Mussentuchit Member.			
Primaderma	Primaderma nessovi		Mussentuchit Member.			
Coniophis	Coniophis sp.		Mussentuchit Member.			

===== Turtles =====
Indeterminate baenid remains present in the Mussentuchit Member.

Turtle of the Cedar Mountain Formation
Genus	Species	Location	Member	Abundance	Description	Images
Glyptops	Glyptops sp.		Yellow Cat Member; Mussentuchit Member			Peripherals
Naomichelys	Naomichelys sp.		Mussentuchit Member.			Peripherals
gen. nov.	sp. nov.		Yellow Cat Member			Peripherals

==== Amphibians ====
Indeterminate anuran remains present in the Mussentuchit Member.

Amphibians of the Cedar Mountain Formation
Genus	Species	Location	Member	Abundance	Description	Images
Albanerpeton	Albanerpeton cf. A. nexuosus		Mussentuchit Member			Albanerpeton

==== Fish ====
===== Bony fish =====
Indeterminate amiiform present in the Yellow Cat and Mussentuchit Members. Indeterminate neopterygian remains present in the Mussentuchit Member. Possible indeterminate pycnodontid remains present in the Mussentuchit Member. Possible indeterminate lepisosteid remains present in the Mussentuchit Member.

Bony fishes of the Cedar Mountain Formation
Genus	Species	Location	Member	Abundance	Description	Images
Semionotus?	Semionotus? sp.		Yellow Cat Member			Semionotus Ceratodus
Ceratodus	C. kempae		Yellow Cat Member			Semionotus Ceratodus
Ceratodus	C. kirklandi		Yellow Cat Member			Semionotus Ceratodus
Ceratodus	C. molossus		Mussentuchit Member			Semionotus Ceratodus

===== Cartilaginous fish =====
A new genus and species of orectolobid present in the Mussentuchit Member.

Cartilaginous Fishes of the Cedar Mountain Formation
Genus	Species	Location	Member	Abundance	Description	Images
Hybodus	Hybodus sp.		Ruby Ranch Member; Mussentuchit Member			Hybodus
Polyacrodus	Polyacrodus parvidens		Mussentuchit Member			Hybodus
Lissodus	Lissodus sp.		Mussentuchit Member			Hybodus
Ischyrhiza	Ischyrhiza sp.		Mussentuchit Member			Hybodus
Pseudohypolophus	Pseudohypolophus sp.		Mussentuchit Member			Hybodus
cf. Baibisha	New species		Mussentuchit Member			Hybodus
Cretorectolobus	Indeterminate		Mussentuchit Member			Hybodus

==== Mammaliaformes ====
New genus and species of pappotheriid present in the Mussentuchit Member. Indeterminate genus and species of picopsid present in the Mussentuchit Member.

Mammals of the Cedar Mountain Formation
Genus	Species	Location	Member	Abundance	Description	Images
Ameribaatar	Ameribaatar zofiae		Mussentuchit		An unspecified multituberculate.	
Astroconodon	Astroconodon delicatus		Mussentuchit		A predatory alticonodontine triconodontid with a debate on whether it was fully terrestrial or semiaquatic.	
Bryceomys	Bryceomys intermedius		Mussentuchit		An unspecified multituberculate, probably a cimolodont.	
Cedaromys	Cedaromys bestia		Mussentuchit			
Cedaromys	Cedaromys parvus		Mussentuchit			
Cifelliodon	Cifelliodon wahkermoosuch		Yellow Cat Member		a haramiyidan mammaliaform	
Corviconodon	Corviconodon utahensis		Mussentuchit			
Dakotadens	Dakotadens pertritus		Mussentuchit			
Janumys	Janumys erebos		Mussentuchit			
Jugulator	Jugulator amplissimus		Mussentuchit			
Kokopellia	Kokopellia juddi		Mussentuchit		Possible metatherian	
Paracimexomys	Paracimexomys perplexus		Mussentuchit			
Paracimexomys	Paracimexomys robisoni		Mussentuchit			
Spalacolestes	Spalacolestes cretulablatta		Mussentuchit			
Spalacolestes	Spalacolestes inconcinnus		Mussentuchit			
Spalacotheridium	Spalacotheridium noblei		Mussentuchit			

== See also ==
- List of dinosaur-bearing rock formations
