= Bacharam =

Coordinates: 16°16′N 78°22′E

- Village
- Interactive map of Bacharam
- Country: India
- State: Telangana

Area
  - Total: 7.44 km^{2} (2.87 sq mi)
- Elevation: 700 m (2,300 ft)

Population (2011)
  - Total: 1,611
  - Density: 26/km^{2} (67/sq mi)

Languages
  - Official: Telugu
- Time zone: UTC+5:30 (IST)
- PIN: 501505
- Telephone code: 040
- Vehicle registration: TG- 07
- Sex ratio: 1000:1029 ♂/♀

Bacharam is a village in Rangareddy district in Telangana, India. It falls under Hayathnagar mandal. It is closer to the Outer Ring Road, Hyderabad. The village has a British-era fort and the temples.

== Geography ==
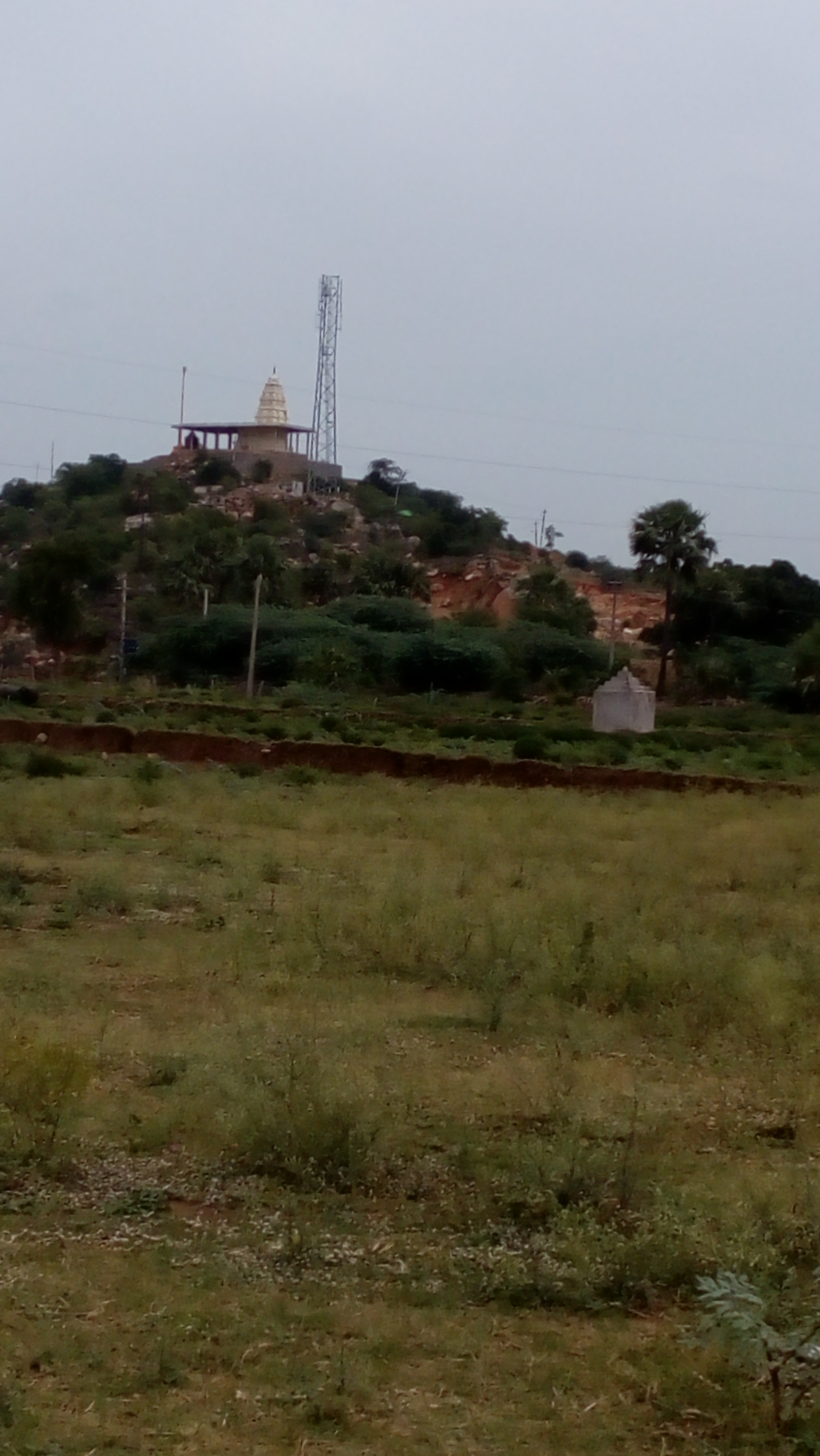
Gnanagiri Laxmi Narasimha Swami Temple at Bacharam

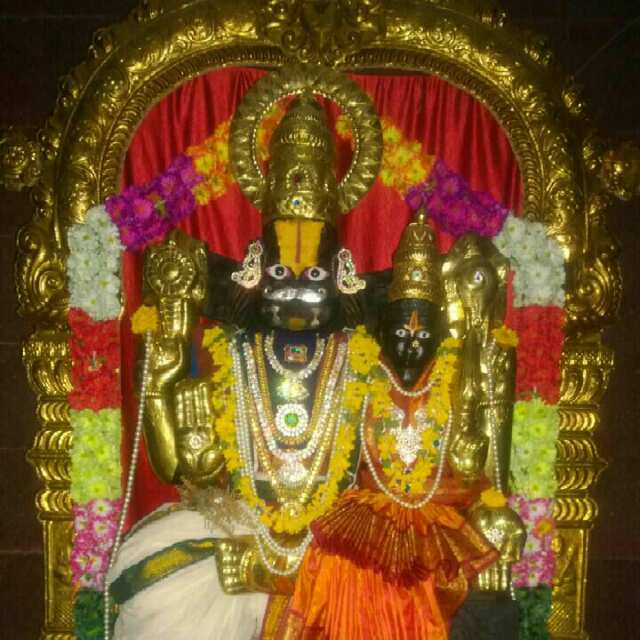
Sri Sri Sri. Gnanagiri Laxmi Narasimha Swami at Bacharam

Bacharam is a village in Telangana State, Rangareddy District, Hayathnagar Mandal. It is 14.8 km from its Mandal with an area extant of 744 hectares (1,840 acres), well protected with hills and forests. Now ORR (Outer Ring Road) is main geographical attraction to this village.

== Boundaries ==
- East:Ravirala
- West:Pratapa singaram
- North:Edulabad
- South:Taramathipet
