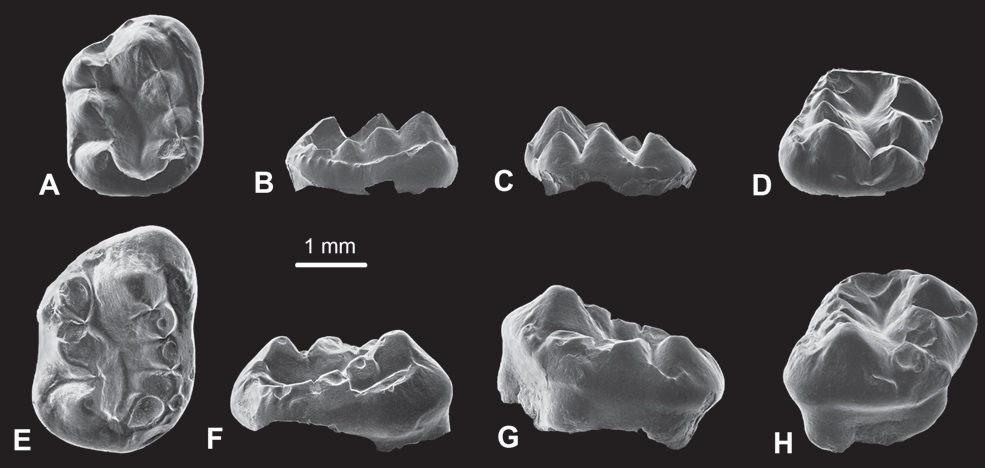
- Molariforms of Thomasia cf. moorei

Scientific classification
- Domain: Eukaryota
- Kingdom: Animalia
- Phylum: Chordata
- Clade: Synapsida
- Clade: Therapsida
- Clade: Cynodontia
- Clade: Mammaliaformes
- Order: †Haramiyida
- Family: †Haramiyidae
- Genus: †Thomasia; Poche, 1908

Type species
- †Microlestes antiquus Pleininger, 1847

Species
- †T. antiqua (Plieninger, 1847); †T. hahni Butler & Macintyre, 1994; †T. moorei (Owen, 1871); †T. woutersi Butler & Macintyre, 1994

Synonyms
- Haramiya Simpson, 1947; Microcleptes Simpson, 1928; Microlestes Plieninger, 1847; Pleiningeria Krausse, 1919

= Thomasia (animal) =

Thomasia Temporal range: Rhaetian-Hettangian ~206–189 Ma

Extinct genus of mammaliaforms

Thomasia is a mammaliaform from the family Haramiyidae. from the Late Triassic of Europe. It is only known from teeth.

== Distribution ==
Fossils of the genus have been found in:

Triassic

- Sables and Grès de Mortinsart Formations, Gaume, Belgium
- Microlestes Quarry, Frome, England
- Exter and Trossingen Formations, Germany
- Auf dem Heftgen, Syren, Luxembourg
- Klettgau Formation, Switzerland
- Gres à Avicula contorta Formation, Franche-Comté and Lorraine, France

Jurassic

- Pant Fissure System 4, Pant Quarry, St Brides Major (community), Wales
