= Cedar Mountain (Moffat County, Colorado) =

Mountain in the state of Colorado

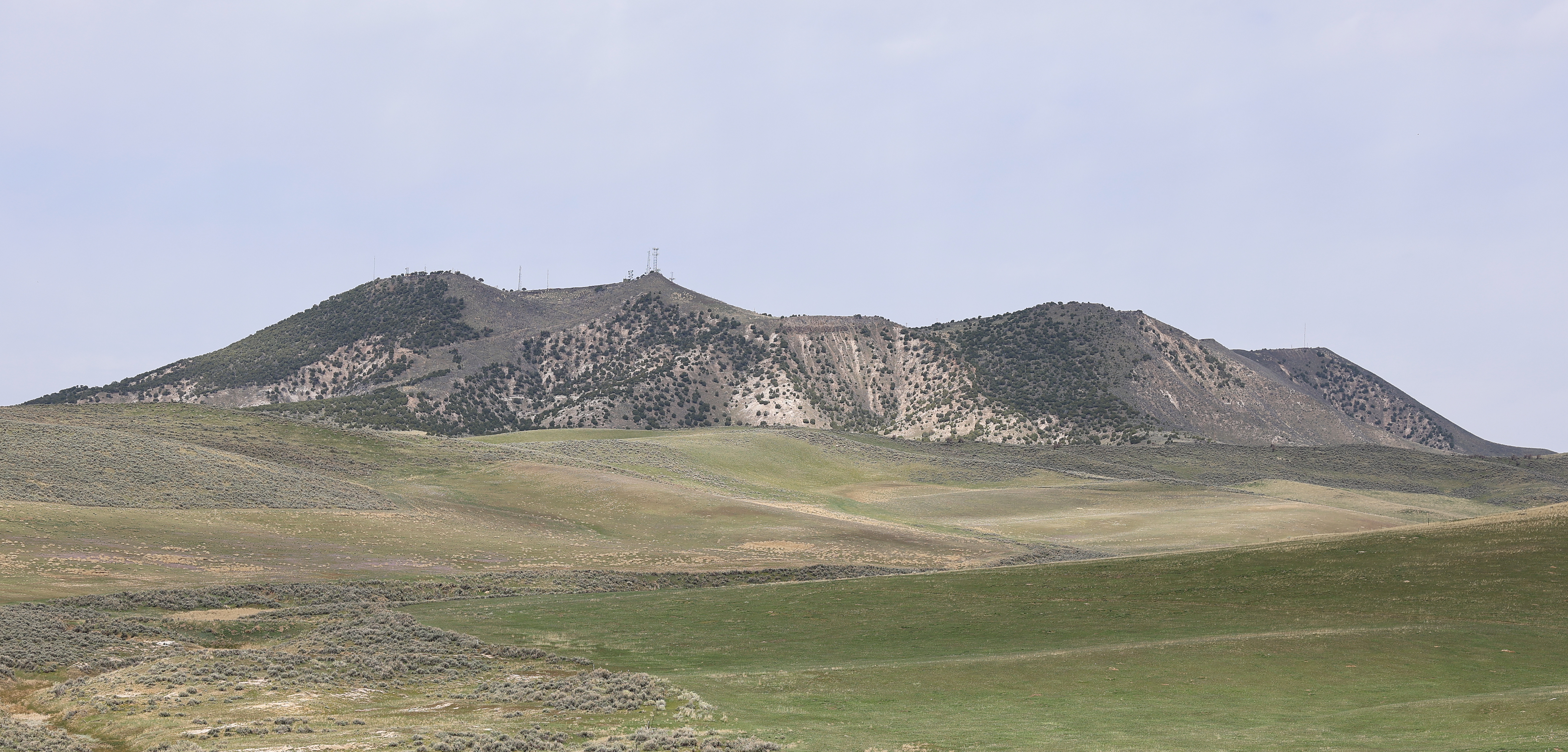
- The mountain in 2025

Highest point
- Elevation: 7,527 ft (2,294 m)
- Prominence: 714 ft (218 m)
- Coordinates: 40°34′34.46″N 107°36′31.13″W

Geography
- Location within Colorado
- Location: Moffat County, Colorado, U.S.
- Parent range: Elkhead Mountains
- Topo map(s): USGS 7.5' topographic map Craig, Colorado

Climbing
- Easiest route: hike

Cedar Mountain, elevation 7,527 feet (2,294 meters), is a summit in the Elkhead Mountains northwest of Craig in Moffat County, Colorado, U.S.

== Cedar Mountain Recreation Area ==
The Bureau of Land Management manages the Cedar Mountain Recreation Area. Free to access, the area covers 880 acres (360 hectares) on the mountain. A hiking trail, the Stearns Trail, starts at the parking lot.

== Historical names ==
The peak was previously called Fortification Butte.

== Geology ==
The mountain is made up of white sandstone of the Browns Park Formation covered by a layer of basalt from an ancient lava flow. Thus, the mountain is not a volcano.
