= Theroteinus =

Theroteinus Temporal range: Rhaetian

Scientific classification
- Kingdom: Animalia
- Phylum: Chordata
- Clade: Synapsida
- Clade: Therapsida
- Clade: Cynodontia
- Clade: Mammaliaformes
- Order: †Haramiyida
- Suborder: †Theroteinida; Hahn et al., 1989
- Family: †Theroteinidae; Sigogneau-Russell et al., 1986
- Genus: †Theroteinus; Sigogneau-Russell et al., 1986

Type species
- †Theroteinus nikolai Sigogneau-Russell et al., 1986

Other species
- †T. rosieriensis Debuysschere, 2016; †T. jenkinsi Whiteside & Duffin, 2021

Extinct genus of mammaliaforms

Theroteinus is an extinct genus of haramiyidan mammaliaforms from the Late Triassic of France and Britain. It contains three species: T. nikolai, T. rosieriensis and T. jenkinsi, the former two of which are known exclusively from teeth found at the sand quarry of Saint-Nicolas-de-Port, while T. jenkinsi is known from a bedded sequence belonging to the Westbury Formation in a road cutting near Holwell, Dorset. Theroteinus is the only member of the family Theroteinidae and the suborder Theroteinida.
