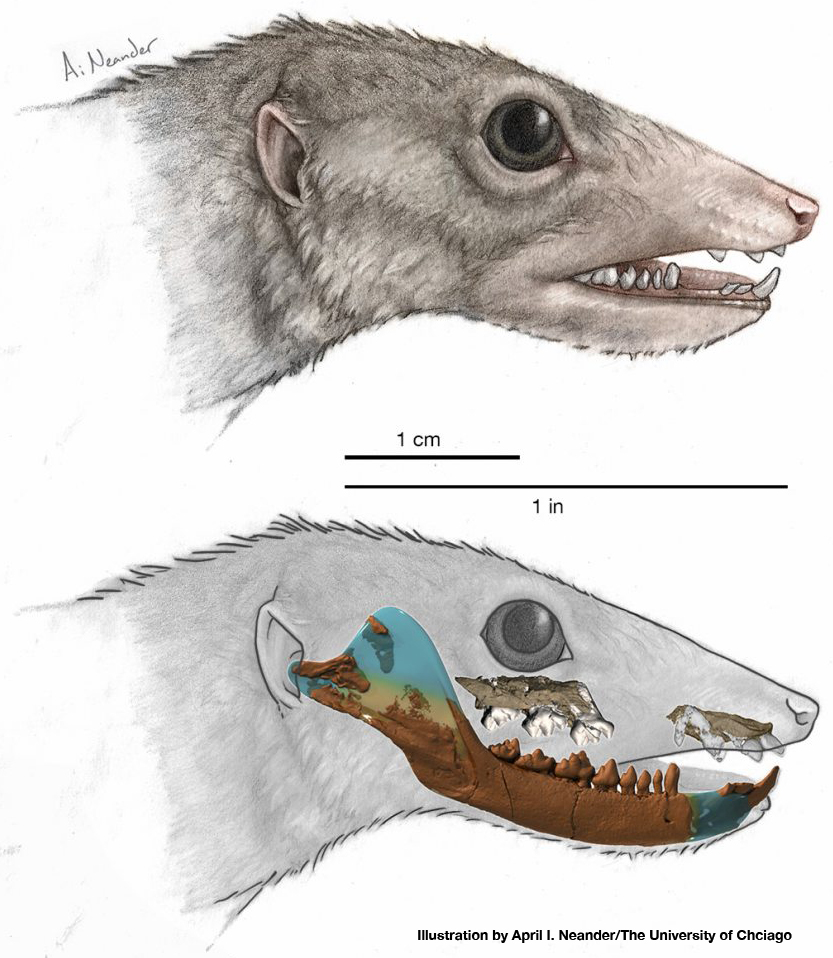
- Life restoration showing known remains

Scientific classification
- Kingdom: Animalia
- Phylum: Chordata
- Clade: Synapsida
- Clade: Therapsida
- Clade: Cynodontia
- Clade: Mammaliaformes
- Order: †Haramiyida
- Superfamily: †Haramiyoidea
- Family: †Haramiyaviidae; Butler, 2000
- Genus: †Haramiyavia; Jenkins et al., 1997
- Species: †H. clemmenseni

Binomial name
- †Haramiyavia clemmenseni Jenkins et al., 1997

= Haramiyavia =

Haramiyavia Temporal range: Rhaetian ~206–202 Ma

Extinct genus of mammaliaforms

Haramiyavia is a genus of synapsid in the clade Haramiyida that existed about 200 million years ago in the Rhaetian stage of the Triassic. Like other haramiyidans, it was likely a non-mammalian mammaliaform. It contains a single species, H. clemmenseni from the Fleming Fjord Formation of Greenland, and has been assigned to the monogeneric family Haramiyaviidae.

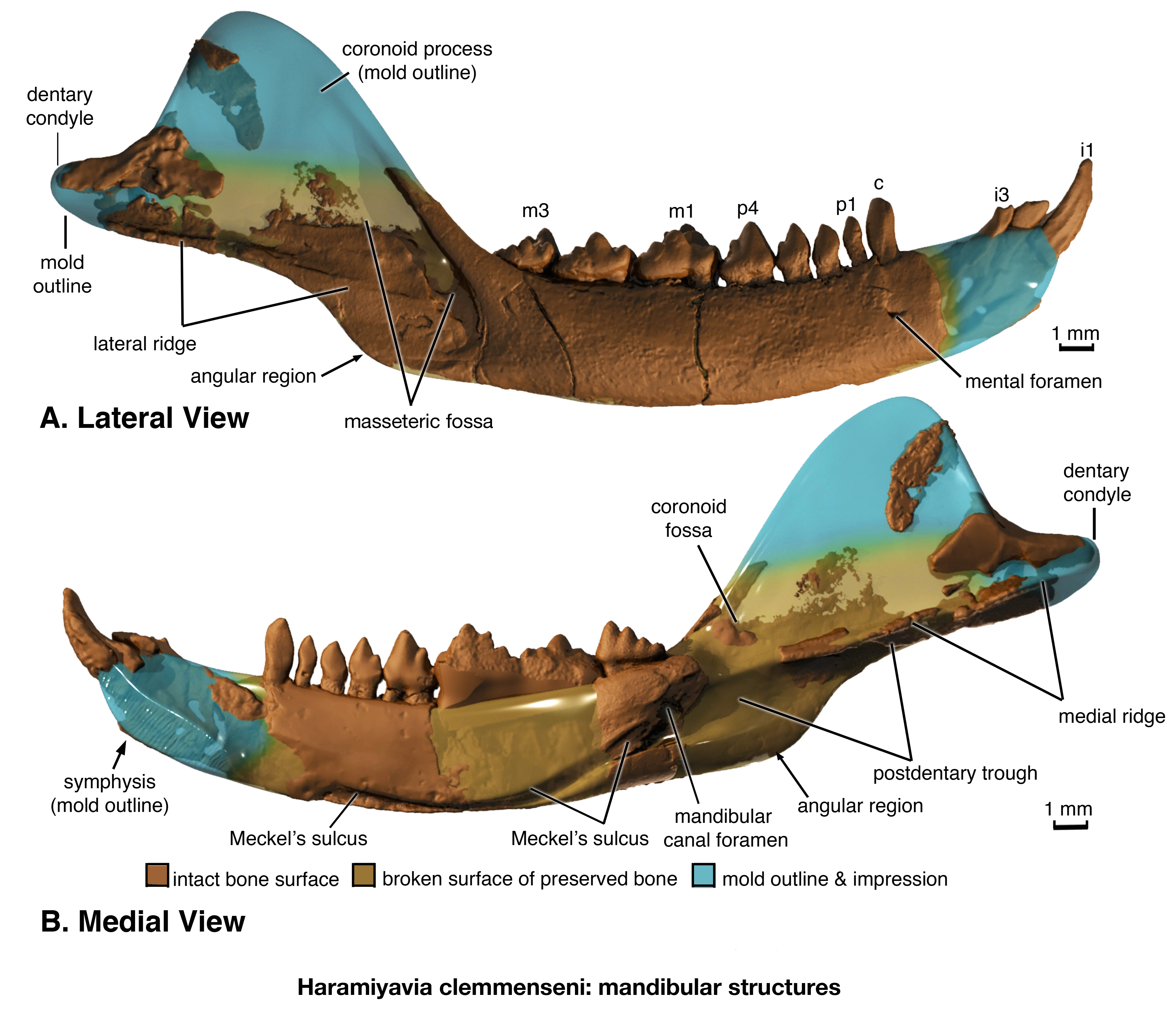
Dentary in lateral and medial views

== Biology ==
A study involving Mesozoic mammaliaform dietary habits ranks it among insectivorous taxa.
