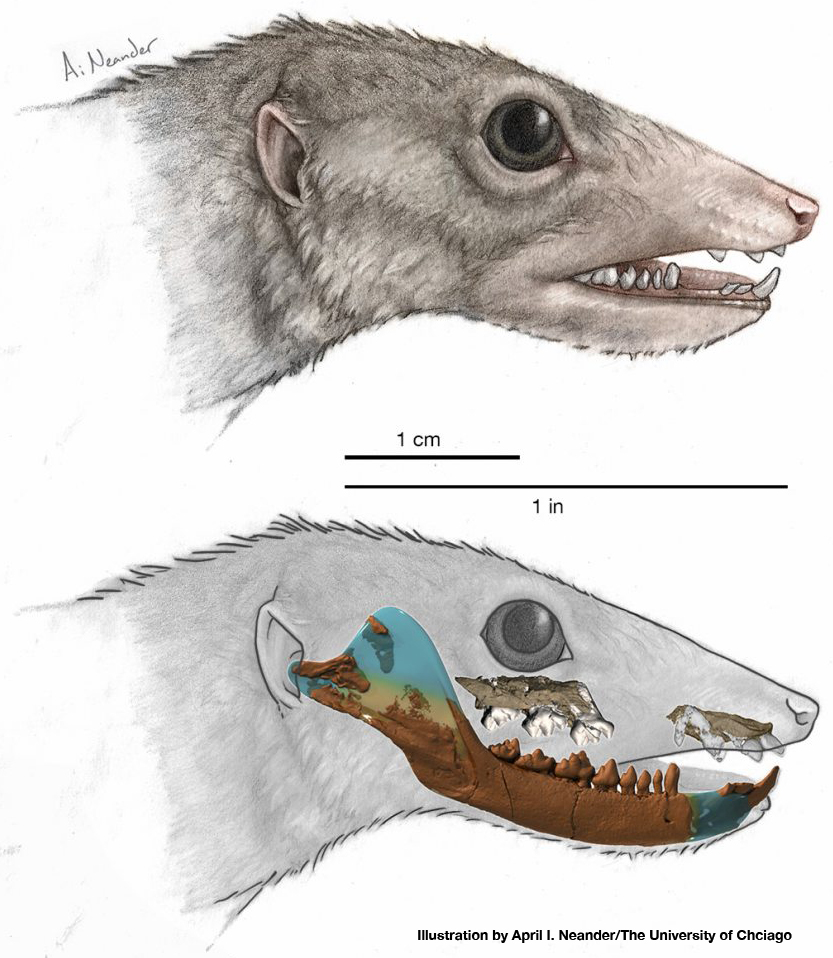
- Lower jaw and restoration of Haramiyavia, a basal haramiyidan from the Triassic of Greenland
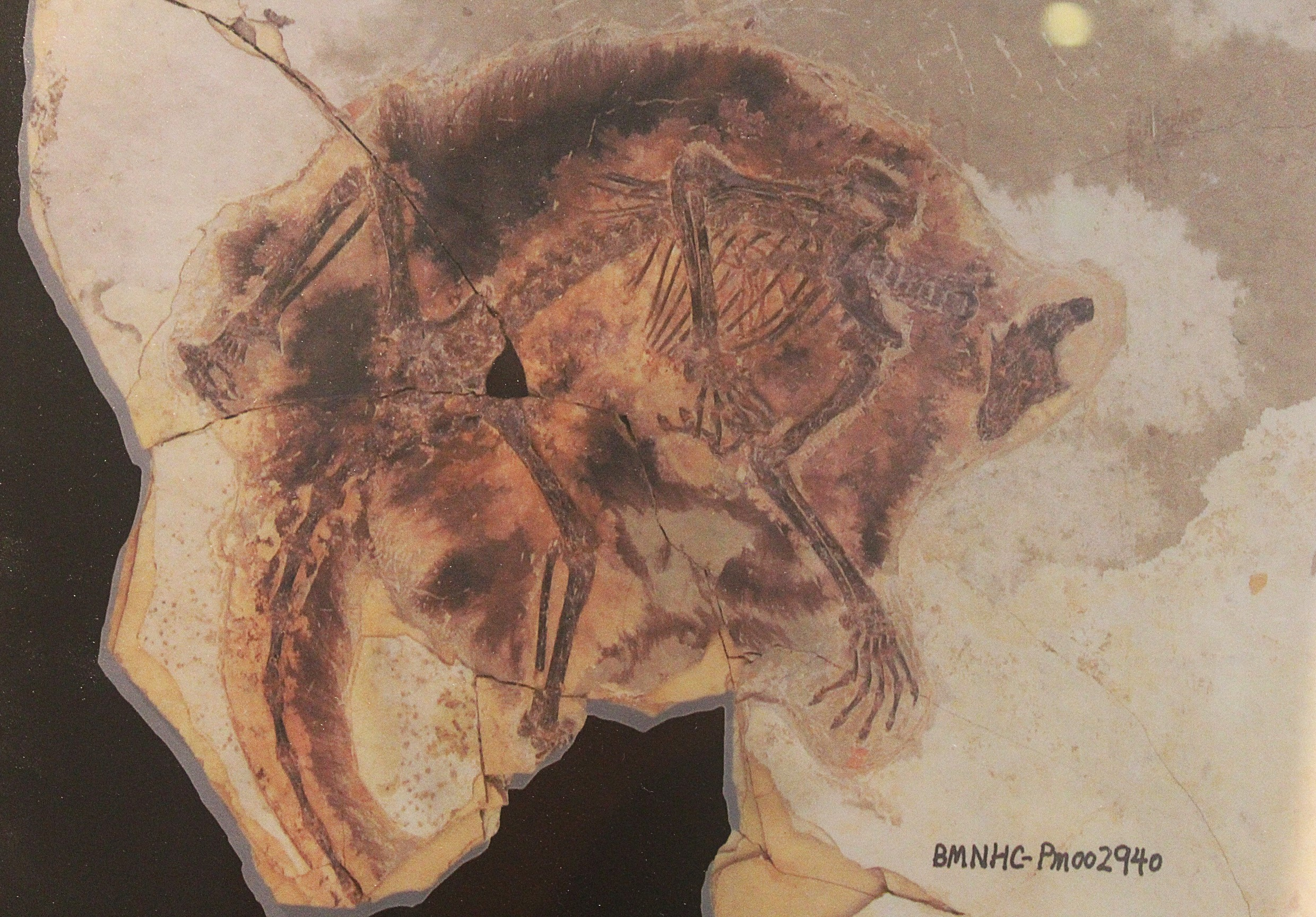
- Skeleton of Maiopatagium a gliding squirrel-like euharamiyidan from the Middle Jurassic of China

Scientific classification
- Kingdom: Animalia
- Phylum: Chordata
- Clade: Synapsida
- Clade: Therapsida
- Clade: Cynodontia
- Clade: Mammaliaformes
- Order: †Haramiyida; Hahn, Sigogneau-Russell & Wouters, 1989

Subgroups
- †Kalaallitkigun; †Kollikodon?; †Haramiyoidea; †Haramiyidae; †Allostaffia?; †Avashishta?; †Eoraetia; †Hypsiprymnopsis?; †Thomasia; †Haramiyaviidae; †Haramiyavia; †Kirtlingtonia; †Avashishta?; †Hahnodontidae; †Cifelliodon; †Denisodon; †Hahnodon; †Hahnotheriidae; †Hahnotherium; †Theroteinida; †Theroteinidae; †Theroteinus; †Euharamiyida; ?†Gondwanatheria

= Haramiyida =

Haramiyida Temporal range: Late Triassic–Early Cretaceous, 216.5–125 Ma Possible Maastrichtian record

Extinct order of mammaliaforms

Haramiyida is a possibly paraphyletic order of mammaliaform cynodonts or mammals of controversial taxonomic affinites. Their teeth, which are by far the most common remains, resemble those of the multituberculates. However, based on Haramiyavia, the jaw is less derived; and at the level of evolution of earlier basal mammals like Morganucodon and Kuehneotherium, with a groove for ear ossicles on the dentary. Some authors have placed them in a clade with Multituberculata dubbed Allotheria within Mammalia. Other studies have disputed this and suggested the Haramiyida were not crown group mammals, but were part of an earlier offshoot of Mammaliaformes instead, either closely related or unrelated to Multituberculates. It is also disputed whether the Late Triassic species are closely related to the Jurassic and Cretaceous members belonging to Euharamiyida/Eleutherodontida, as some phylogenetic studies recover the two groups as unrelated, recovering the Triassic haramiyidians as non-mammalian cynodonts, while recovering the Euharamiyida as crown-group mammals closely related to multituberculates.

== Taxonomy ==
Order †Haramiyida Hahn, Sigogneau-Russell & Wouters, 1989 [Haramiyoidea Hahn, 1973 sensu McKenna & Bell, 1997]

- †Kirtlingtonia Butler & Hooker, 2005
- Family †Haramiyaviidae Butler, 2000
  - †Haramiyavia Jenkins et al., 1997
- Family †Theroteinidae Sigogneau-Russell, Frank & Hammerle, 1986
  - †Theroteinus nikolai Sigogneau-Russell, Frank & Hammerle, 1986
  - †Theroteinus rosieriensis Sigogneau-Russell, 2016
- Family †Haramiyidae Poche, 1908 [Haramiyidae Simpson, 1947 sensu Jenkins et al., 1997; Microlestidae Murry, 1866; Microcleptidae Simpson, 1928]
  - †Eoraetia
  - †Hypsiprymnopsis rhaeticus Dawkins, 1864 [Microlestes rhaeticus Dawkins, 1864]
  - †Avashishta bacharamensis Anantharaman et al., 2006
  - ?†Allostaffia aenigmatica (Heinrich, 1999) Heinrich 2004 [Staffia Heinrich, 1999 non Schubert, 1911; Staffia aenigmatica Heinrich, 1999]; possible, gondwanathere instead.
  - †Thomasia Poche, 1908 [Haramiya Simpson, 1947; Microlestes Plieninger, 1847 non Schmidt-Goebel, 1846; Microcleptes Simpson, 1928 non Newman, 1840; Plieningeria Krausse, 1919; Stathmodon Henning, 1911]
    - †T. woutersi Butler & MacIntyre, 1994
    - †T. hahni Butler & MacIntyre, 1994
    - †T. moorei (Owen 1871) Butler & MacIntyre, 1994 [Haramiya moorei (Owen, 1871) Simpson, 1947; Microleptes moorei Owen, 1871; Microcleptes moorei (Owen, 1871) Simpson, 1928]
    - †T. antiqua (Plieninger, 1847) Poche 1908 [Microlestes antiquus Plieninger, 1847; Haramiya antiqua (Plieninger, 1847); Microleptes fissurae Simpson, 1928; Haramiya fissurae (Simpson 1928); Haramiya butleri Sigogneau-Russell, 1990; Thomasia anglica Simpson, 1928]
- †Hahnodontidae Sigogneau-Russell, 1991
  - †Cifelliodon wahkarmoosuch Huttenlocker et al., 2018
  - † Denisodon
  - † Hahnodon taqueti Sigogneau-Russell, 1991
- †Euharamiyida Bi et al., 1994
- ?†Gondwanatheria Mones, 1987

=== Relationships ===
The relationships of haramiydans to other mammals and mammaliaform cynodonts are controversial and have been subject to numerous conflicting phylogenetic analysis results. Major unresolved questions are whether or not haramiyidans are more closely related to marsupials and placental mammals (Theria) than they are to monotremes (and thus inside the crown group of Mammalia), or whether all living mammals (including therians and monotremes) are more closely related to each other than to haramiyidans (and thus placing Haramiyida outside crown Mammalia) and whether or not haramiyidans are closely related to multituberculates, an important of group of Mesozoic and early Cenozoic mammaliaforms typically regarded as crown group mammals, as part of the group Allotheria. While many studies recover Triassic haramiyidans and Jurassic euharamiyidans as closely related, some phylogenetic studies have recovered them as unrelated, find the Triassic haramiyidians as non-mammalian cynodonts, while recovering the Euharamiyida as crown-group mammals closely related to multituberculates.

Cladogram from Luo et al 2017, showing a monophyletic Haramiyida outside of crown Mammalia unrelated to Multituberculata:

- Mammaliamorpha
  - †Tritylodontidae
  - Mammaliaformes
    - †Morganucodonta
    - - †Docodonta
      - - †Haramiyida
          - - †Haramiyavia
            - †Thomasia
          - †Euharamiyida
        - Mammalia
          - Monotremata
          - - †Eutriconodonta
            - - †Multituberculata
              - Cladotheria (including Theria)

Cladogram from Han et al. 2017, showing a paraphyletic Haramiyida within crown Mammalia as ancestral to Multituberculata:

- Mammaliamorpha
  - †Tritylodontidae
  - Mammaliaformes
    - †Morganucodonta
    - - †Docodonta
      - - Monotremata
        - - †Eutriconodonta
          - - Cladotheria (including Theria)
            - †Allotheria
              - †Haramiyavia
              - - †Thomasia
                - - †Euharamiyida
                  - †Multituberculata

Cladogram from Hoffmann et al. 2020, showing a diphyletic Haramiyida.

- Mammaliamorpha
  - - "basal haramiyidans"
      - †Thomasia
      - †Haramiyavia
    - - †Megaconus
      - †Tritylodontidae
  - Mammalia
    - †Morganucodonta
    - †Docodonta
    - Monotremata
    - †Eutriconodonta
    - Theriiformes
      - Cladotheria (including Theria)
      - †Allotheria
        - †Multituberculata
        - - †Euharamiyida
          - - †Cifelliodon
            - †Gondwanatheria

Simplified cladogram from Mao et al. 2024, showing a paraphyletic Haramiyida closely related to Multituberculata outside of crown Mammalia:

- Mammaliamorpha
  - †Tritylodontidae
  - Mammaliaformes
    - †Sinoconodon
    - - †Morganucodonta
      - - †Docodonta+Shuotheriidae
        - †Hadrocodium
        - - †Allotheria
            - †Haramiyavia
            - - †Thomasia
              - - †Euharamiyida
                - †Multituberculata (including Gondwanatheria)
          - Mammalia (crown group)
            - Australosphenida (including Monotremata)
            - - †Eutriconodonta (partim)
              - - †Gobiconodontidae
                - - †Spalacotheriidae and other "symmetrodonts"
                  - Cladotheria
                    - †Dryolestida
                    - Theria

== Lifestyle ==
Haramiyids seem to have generally been herbivorous or omnivorous, possibly the first mammalian herbivores; however, the sole haramiyid tested in a study involving Mesozoic mammal dietary habits, Haramiyavia, ranks among insectivorous species. At least some species were very good climbers and were similar to modern day squirrels; and several others have more recently been reassessed as possibly arboreal. General arboreal habits might explain their rarity in the fossil record.

Several euharamiyidans, Maiopatagium, Xianshou, Vilevolodon and Arboroharamiya, took it one step further and developed the ability to glide, having extensive membranes similar to those of modern colugos. In many of these taxa, the coracoid bones (absent in modern therians but present in many other mammal groups, albeit highly reduced) are remarkably large and similar to those of birds and pterosaurs, presumably due to impact stresses at landing.

Mammalian tooth marks on dinosaur bones may belong to Sineleutherus, suggesting that some haramiyidans scavenged on dinosaur remains.

== Range ==
The fossils of Late Triassic Haramiyids are primarily known from Europe and Greenland, while the fossils of Euharamiyids are primarily known from the Middle to Late Jurassic of Asia. Remains of eleutherodontids from Europe are only known from isolated teeth.

The youngest haramiyid fossil genus has been considered to be possibly be Avashishta bacharamensis from the Maastrichtian of India, however, this has not been robustly assessed by phylogenetics. The youngest definitive euharamiyidan is Cryoharamiya from the Early Cretaceous Batylykh Formation of Yakutia, Russia.
