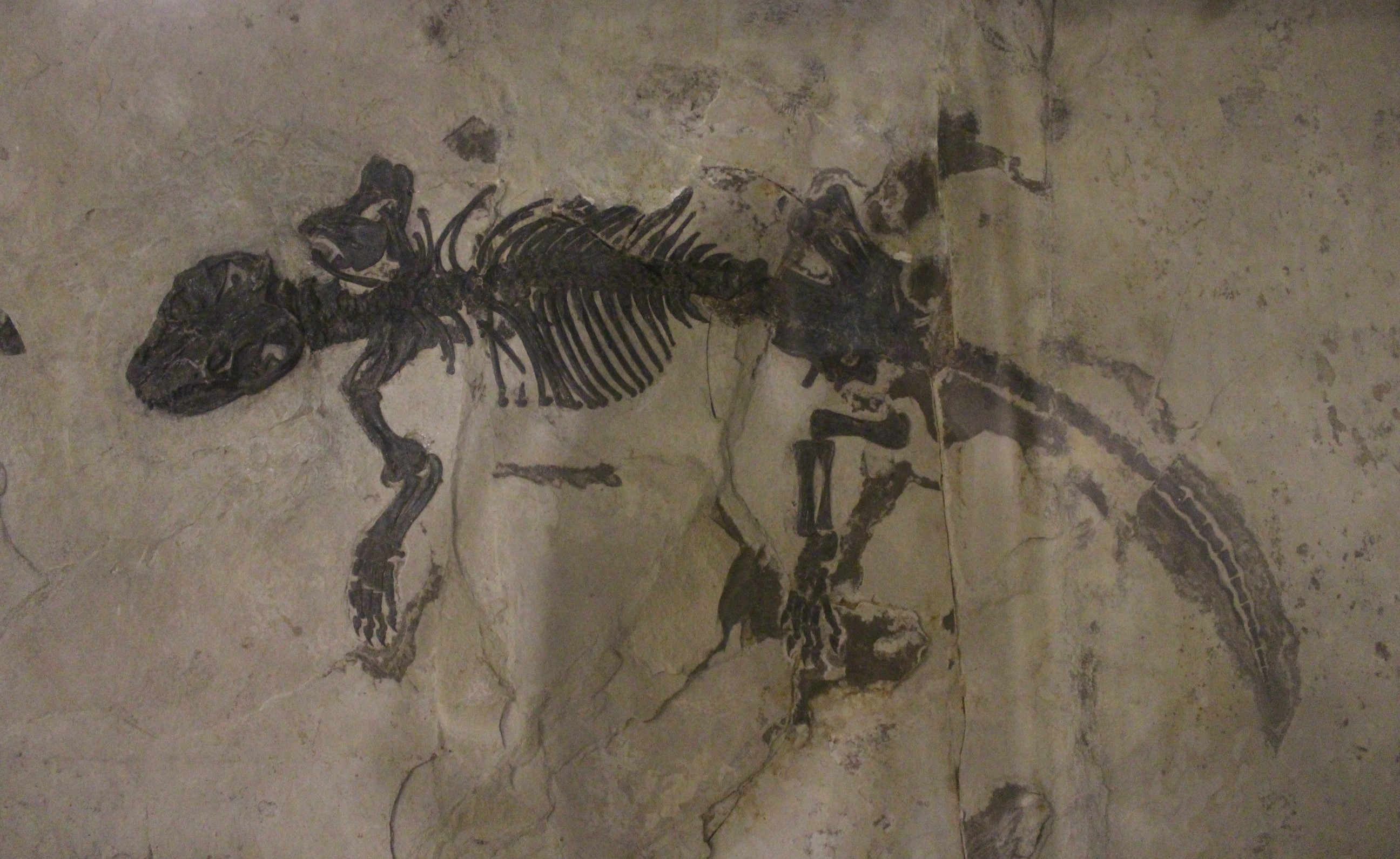
- Holotype (IVPP V16051) of L. hui, Paleozoological Museum of China

Scientific classification
- Kingdom: Animalia
- Phylum: Chordata
- Class: Mammalia
- Order: †Eutriconodonta
- Genus: †Liaoconodon; Meng, Wang & Li, 2011

Species
- †L. hui Meng, Wang & Li, 2011 (type)

= Liaoconodon =

Liaoconodon Temporal range: Aptian, 120 Ma

Extinct family of mammals

Liaoconodon is an extinct genus of early mammal from the early Cretaceous (early Aptian stage, approximately 120 Ma). It is a eutriconodont which lived in what is now the Jianchang of Liaoning Province, eastern China. It is known from the holotype IVPP V 16051, which consists of nearly complete skeleton and skull. It was found in the Jiufotang Formation (Jehol Biota) near Xiaotaizi, Lamadong. It was first named by Jin Meng, Yuanqing Wang and Chuankui Li in 2011 and the type species is Liaoconodon hui.

Studies on its anatomy show that it was a semi-aquatic mammal, having a long body and paddle-like limbs.

== Phylogeny ==
Cladogram after Thomas Martin et al. 2015

- Eutriconodonta
  - Amphilestidae
    - Phascolotherium
    - Amphilestes
  - - - Amphidontidae
        - Hakusanodon
        - Juchilestes
      - - Gobiconodontidae
          - Spinolestes
          - - Gobiconodon
            - Repenomamus
        - - Jeholodens
          - - Yanoconodon
            - - Liaoconodon
              - - Volaticotheria
                  - Volaticotherium
                  - Argentoconodon
                - Triconodontidae
                  - Trioracodon
                  - - Triconodon
                    - - Priacodon
                      - - Arundelconodon
                        - - Meiconodon
                          - - Astroconodon
                            - - Alticonodon
                              - Corviconodon
