= Juchilestes =

Juchilestes Temporal range: Early Cretaceous, 123.2 Ma

Scientific classification
- Domain: Eukaryota
- Kingdom: Animalia
- Phylum: Chordata
- Class: Mammalia
- Order: †Eutriconodonta
- Family: †Amphidontidae
- Genus: †Juchilestes; Gao et al., 2010

Type species
- Juchilestes liaoningensis Gao et al., 2010

Extinct family of mammals

Juchilestes is an amphidontid mammal genus from the early Cretaceous (early Aptian stage, 123.2 ± 1.0 Ma). It lived in what is now the Beipiao of western Liaoning, eastern China. It is known from the holotype D2607, which consists of three-dimensionally preserved, partial skull with mandibles and some teeth. It was found in 2004 from the Lujiatun Site of the Yixian Formation (Jehol Biota). It was first named by Chun-Ling Gao, Gregory P. Wilson, Zhe-Xi Luo, A. Murat Maga, Qingjin Meng and Xuri Wang in 2010 and the type species is Juchilestes liaoningensis.

== Phylogeny ==
Cladogram after Thomas Martin et al. 2015

- Eutriconodonta
  - Amphilestidae
    - Phascolotherium
    - Amphilestes
  - - - Amphidontidae
        - Hakusanodon
        - Juchilestes
      - - Gobiconodontidae
          - Spinolestes
          - - Gobiconodon
            - Repenomamus
        - - Jeholodens
          - - Yanoconodon
            - - Liaoconodon
              - - Volaticotheria
                  - Volaticotherium
                  - Argentoconodon
                - Triconodontidae
                  - Trioracodon
                  - - Triconodon
                    - - Priacodon
                      - - Arundelconodon
                        - - Meiconodon
                          - - Astraconodon
                            - - Alticonodon
                              - Corviconodon
