= Dongoconodon =

Dongoconodon Temporal range: Early Cretaceous (~late Barremian–Aptian), 122.0–118.9 Ma

Scientific classification
- Kingdom: Animalia
- Phylum: Chordata
- Class: Mammalia
- Order: †Eutriconodonta
- Family: incertae sedis
- Genus: †Dongoconodon; Bi et al., 2026
- Species: †D. platycauda

Binomial name
- †Dongoconodon platycauda Bi et al., 2026

Extinct mammal genus

Dongoconodon (lit. 'Dong's cone tooth') is an extinct genus of early mammal in the order Eutriconodonta known from the Early Cretaceous (Barremian–Aptian age) Jiufotang Formation of China. The genus contains a single species, Dongoconodon platycauda, known from a nearly complete skeleton missing part of the left forelimb. Dongoconodon has a unique pattern of replacement teeth (polyphyodonty) compared to most mammals. Several anatomical features, such as evidence for webbed hands and a flattened tail, indicate it had a semiaquatic ecology.

== Discovery and naming ==
External image
- Holotype specimen: photograph (left) and line drawing (right).

The Dongoconodon fossil material was collected by Junyou Wang in 2016 from outcrops of the Jiufotang Formation (Changzigou locality) near Sanjiazi Town in Lingyuan city, Liaoning Province, China. The specimen is housed in the Inner Mongolia Museum of Natural History, where it is permanently accessioned as specimen IMMNH-PV01700. It consists of a nearly complete, articulated skeleton including the skull, preserved on a single slab. The only missing elements are the left humerus, ulna and radius, three bones of the forelimb.

In 2026, Shundong Bi and colleagues described Dongoconodon platycauda as a new genus and species of eutriconodont based on these fossil remains, designating IMMNH-PV01700 as the holotype specimen. The generic name, Dongoconodon, honors Chinese scientist Junshe Dong and his contributions to vertebrate paleontology research. This is combined with the common eutriconodont suffix '-conodon' (lit. 'cone tooth'), from the Greek κῶνος (kônos) and ὀδών (odṓn). The specific name, platycauda, combines the Greek πλατύς (plătŭ́s), meaning 'flat', with the Latin cauda, meaning tail, referencing the distinctive tail morphology.

== Description and palaeobiology ==
Dongoconodon may have used its tail similary to the living nutria (pictured)

The D. platycauda holotype represents an individual with an estimated body mass of 115–190 grams (0.254–0.419 lb). The skull is flattened but generally triangular in shape and broadest toward the back. The mandible is robust. The jaw shape and caniniform incisors are reminiscent of the related gobiconodontids, suggesting a carnivorous diet involving the active catching and ripping of prey items. The tooth replacement pattern of Dongoconodon is unusual, with multiple generations of teeth indicative of polyphyodonty (continuous replacement of teeth). This contrasts with nearly all other mammals, which are diphyodont (two sets of teeth), and is instead similar to the pattern in many reptiles.

Dongoconodon further exhibits a suite of unique adaptations to a semiaquatic ecology, consistent with features seen in extant semiaquatic mammals. The hands and feet are long and broadened in relation to the limbs, as in the platypus. The arrangement and structure of the phalanges, meta/carpals, and meta/tarsals indicate the digits could be spread, increasing surface area and improving the stroke for swimming. The manual (hand) phalanges bear flanges on the dorsal surfaces, similar to the platypus, marking the attachment points for webbing between the digits. The proximal caudal (tail) vertebrae are broad and flattened, while the vertebrae toward the tip of the tail were longer and more round. This structure is most similar to the extant nutria, where part of the tail is flattened, but the rest is long and tapered.

== Classification ==
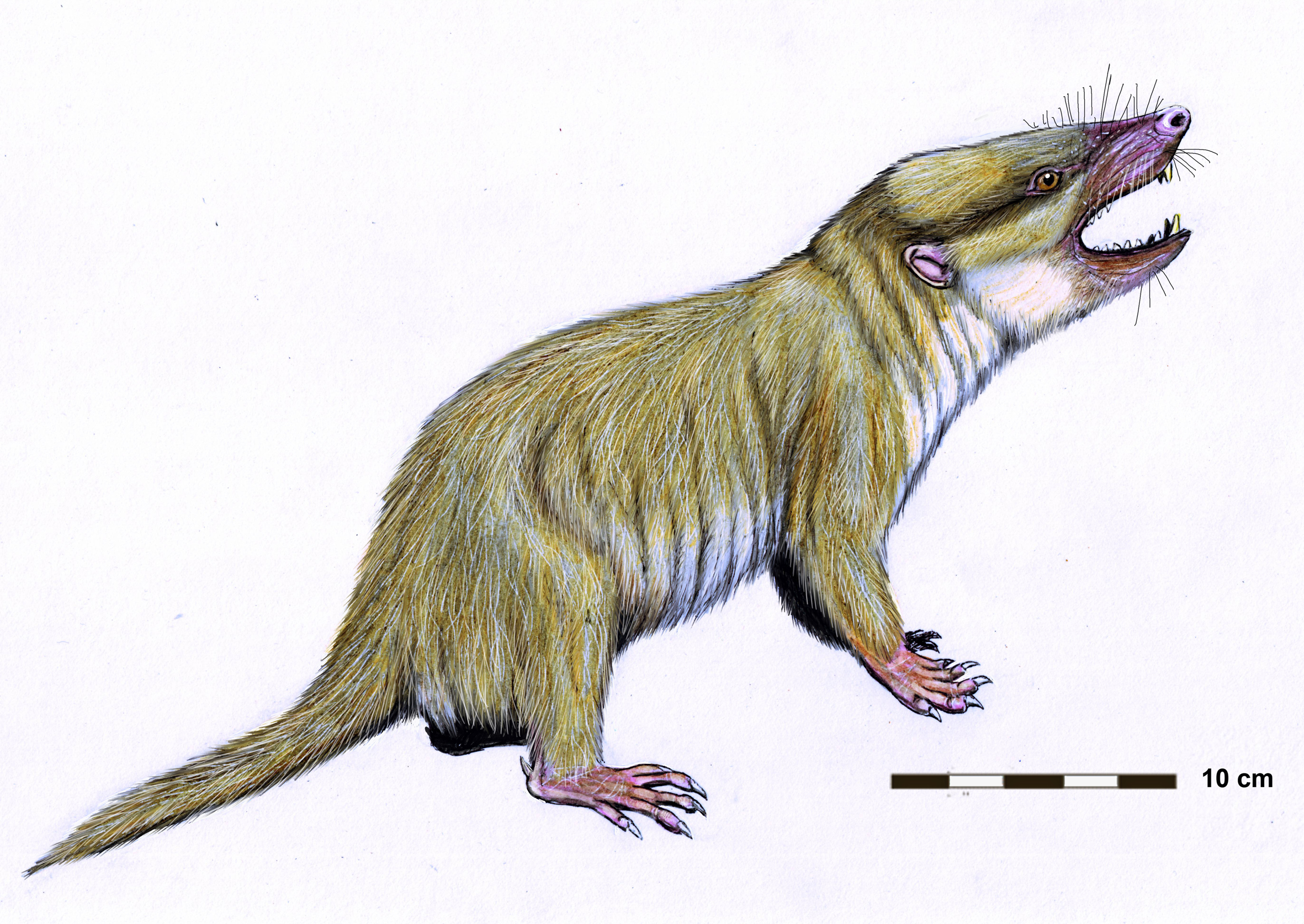
Life restoration of Gobiconodon, a possible close relative without semiaquatic adaptations

Bi et al. (2026) included Dongocondon in a phylogenetic matrix to test its affinities and relationships. It was recovered as the sister taxon to a clade including Spinolestes, Gobiconodon, and Repenomamus, which together comprise the family Gobiconodontidae. These taxa, along with several others, form the early-diverging mammal clade Eutriconodonta. These results are displayed in the cladogram below:

- Mammalia
  - Monotremata
  - - †Allotheria
    - - †Eutriconodonta
        - - †Amphilestes
          - †Acinacodus
          - - †Dongoconodon
            - †Gobiconodontidae
              - †Spinolestes
              - - †Gobiconodon
                - †Repenomamus
        - - - †Jueconodon
            - †Liaoconodon
            - - †Jeholodens
              - †Yanoconodon
          - †Triconodontidae
            - - †Priacodon
              - †Trioracodon
            - - †Triconodon
              - - †Astroconodon
                - †Corviconodon
      - - Trechnotheria
