= Spinolestes =

Spinolestes Temporal range: Early Cretaceous, 125 Ma

Scientific classification
- Kingdom: Animalia
- Phylum: Chordata
- Class: Mammalia
- Order: †Eutriconodonta (?)
- Family: †Gobiconodontidae
- Genus: †Spinolestes; Martin et al., 2015
- Species: †S. xenarthrosus

Binomial name
- †Spinolestes xenarthrosus Martin et al., 2015

Extinct family of mammals

Spinolestes is an extinct mammal genus from the Early Cretaceous of Spain. A gobiconodontid eutriconodont, it is notable for the remarkable degree of preservation, offering profound insights to the biology of non-therian mammals.

== Description ==
Spinolestes' holotype, MCCMLH30000A, hails from Las Hoyas, Spain. The living animal was about 24 centimeters long and weighted somewhere between 50 and 70 grams. As a Konservat-Lagerstätten specimen, it is famous for being remarkably well preserved, including not only the skeleton but also multiple soft tissues like fur, skin, internal organs and ears (both external and internal), a rarity among Mesozoic mammals. Besides soft-tissues, Spinolestes is also remarkable for its xenarthrous vertebrae, convergent with those of xenarthrans and to a lesser extent hero shrews.

=== Soft tissue ===
Hair is very well preserved, down to the cellular level; among fossil mammals it is among the best preserved. Spinolestes' fur was similar to that of modern mammals, possessing compound hair follicles with primary and secondary hair. The guard hairs are proto-spines similar to those of modern spiny mice. In some places on the body, hairs appear to have broken off close to the skin and were discolored near the broken tip – possible signs of dermatophytosis, making it the first Mesozoic mammal with a clear record of a skin infection. Besides hair, Spinolestes also had keratinous scutes.

Uniquely among Mesozoic mammal fossils the internal organs are also preserved, deposits of iron marking the position of the liver and microscopic structures being interpreted as the bronchioles. These are separated by a curved line, assumed to be the thoracic diaphragm.

The ear is very well preserved. The external ear (pinnae) is fairly large and broad in a mouse-like fashion. The inner ear is also exceptionally preserved in the form of the Meckel's cartilage, which may be of extreme relevance in understanding the evolution of the mammalian ear.

== Phylogeny ==
Cladogram after Thomas Martin et al. 2015:

- Eutriconodonta
  - Amphilestidae
    - Phascolotherium
    - Amphilestes
  - - - Amphidontidae
        - Hakusanodon
        - Juchilestes
      - - Gobiconodontidae
          - Spinolestes
          - - Gobiconodon
            - Repenomamus
        - - Jeholodens
          - - Yanoconodon
            - - Liaoconodon
              - - Volaticotheria
                  - Volaticotherium
                  - Argentoconodon
                - Triconodontidae
                  - Trioracodon
                  - - Triconodon
                    - - Priacodon
                      - - Arundelconodon
                        - - Meiconodon
                          - - Astroconodon
                            - - Alticonodon
                              - Corviconodon

== Ecology ==
The environment of Las Hoyas dates to the Barremian, and it was probably a tropical or subtropical wetland habitat, based on its vegetation: Bennettitales, Brachyphyllum, Pagiophyllum, Sphenolepis and Cupressinocladus conifers, Weitchselia reticulata, Montsechia vidali and several others. Various species of fish and aquatic invertebrates are also known.
