= Bocaconodon =

Bocaconodon Temporal range: Pliensbachian, 189–183 Ma

Scientific classification
- Domain: Eukaryota
- Kingdom: Animalia
- Phylum: Chordata
- Clade: Synapsida
- Clade: Therapsida
- Clade: Cynodontia
- Clade: Mammaliaformes
- Genus: †Bocaconodon; Montellano et al., 2008
- Species: †B. tamaulipensis

Binomial name
- †Bocaconodon tamaulipensis Montellano et al., 2008

Extinct genus of mammaliaforms

Bocaconodon (meaning "La Boca conical tooth") is an early mammaliaform genus that lived during the Pliensbachian (Early Jurassic) of Mexico. The type and only species, Bocaconodon tamaulipensis (referring to Tamaulipas, where the holotype was found), was named and described in 2008. It is known from a single specimen, a partial right dentary bone preserving two nearly complete molar teeth and the rear portion of a third molar. The specimen was found at the Huizachal Canyon locality, "a Pliensbachian floodplain siltstone in the La Boca Formation".

== Description ==
The only known specimen of Bocaconodon (IGM 6617) is a partial right dentary bone, which preserves most of the last two molar teeth and the rear portion of a third molar. The preserved part of the dentary was quite thin from top to bottom, with the thinnest part being beneath the last molar. Behind the tooth row there was a facet that may have housed the coronoid bone. At the rear end of the dentary, there was a depression known as the postdentary trough, where the postdentary bones (homologous to some of the middle ear bones of modern mammals) would have been attached. Since the postdentary bones were attached to the dentary, Bocaconodon may have retained the primitive quadrate-articular jaw joint found in most non-mammalian synapsids, in addition to the newer dentary-squamosal joint found in mammals and other mammaliaforms.

The molars had a "triconodont" shape, with three main cusps aligned in a straight line. In both of the well-preserved teeth, the middle cusp (cusp a) was the largest, the cusp behind it (cusp c) was smaller, and the front cusp (cusp b) was smaller still. Cusp a had an asymmetrical, backwards-curved shape, while cusps b and c were more symmetrical. Cusp b pointed upwards while cusp c was more backwards-pointing. Behind cusp c there was another, smaller cusp (cusp d). The molars bore a narrow ridge on the lingual (inner) side known as the cingulum. The lingual cingulum differed from those of most morganucodonts in lacking any distinct cusps.

== Classification ==
The phylogenetic position of Bocaconodon within mammaliaforms is shown in the cladogram below:

- - Morganucodon
  - - Erythrotherium
    - - Megazostrodon
      - - - Kuehneotherium
          - Woutersia
        - - Dinnetherium
          - - - Bocaconodon
              - IGM 6855
            - - - Docodon
                - Haldanodon
              - - - Priacodon
                  - - Victoriaconodon
                    - - - Triconodon
                        - Trioracodon
                      - - Arundelconodon
                        - - Astroconodon
                          - - Alticonodon
                            - Corviconodon
                - - Amphilestes
                  - Phascolotherium
                  - - Aploconodon
                    - - Amphidon
                      - - Comodon
                        - Hakusanodon
                  - - Jeholodens
                    - - Repenomamus
                      - - Gobiconodon
                        - Huasteconodon
                  - - Tinodon
                    - - Amphitherium
                      - - Spalacotheriidae
                        - Zhangheotheriidae
