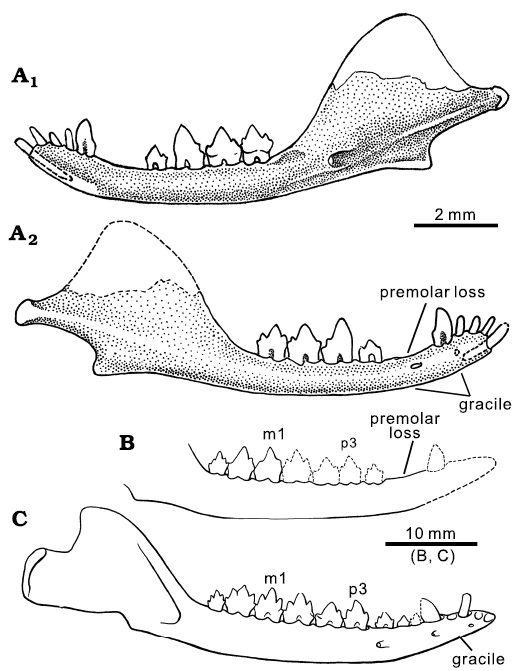
- Lower jaws of Hadrocodium (A) and Dinnetherium (B and C)

Scientific classification
- Domain: Eukaryota
- Kingdom: Animalia
- Phylum: Chordata
- Clade: Synapsida
- Clade: Therapsida
- Clade: Cynodontia
- Clade: Mammaliaformes
- Order: †Morganucodonta
- Family: †Megazostrodontidae
- Genus: †Dinnetherium; Jenkins, Crompton & Downs, 1983
- Species: †D. nezorum

Binomial name
- †Dinnetherium nezorum Jenkins, Crompton & Downs, 1983

= Dinnetherium =

Dinnetherium Temporal range: Sinemurian ~196.5–183 Ma

Extinct genus of mammaliaforms

Dinnetherium is an extinct genus of mammaliaforms from the Early Jurassic of Arizona. The type species, D. nezorum, was named in 1983. It was discovered in a Sinemurian layer of the Kayenta Formation, within the Gold Spring Quarry 1. The holotype is MNA V3221, which is a partial right mandible.

Dinnetherium has sometimes been placed in the family Megazostrodontidae, but in 2011 the monotypic family Dinnetheriidae and order Dinnetheria were erected for the genus.

== Classification ==
The phylogenetic position of Dinnetherium within mammaliaforms is shown in the cladogram below:

- - Morganucodon
  - - Erythrotherium
    - - Megazostrodon
      - - - Kuehneotherium
          - Woutersia
        - - Dinnetherium
          - - - Bocaconodon
              - IGM 6855
            - - - Docodon
                - Haldanodon
              - - - Priacodon
                  - - Victoriaconodon
                    - - - Triconodon
                        - Trioracodon
                      - - Arundelconodon
                        - - Astroconodon
                          - - Alticonodon
                            - Corviconodon
                - - Amphilestes
                  - Phascolotherium
                  - - Aploconodon
                    - - Amphidon
                      - - Comodon
                        - Hakusanodon
                  - - Jeholodens
                    - - Repenomamus
                      - - Gobiconodon
                        - Huasteconodon
                  - - Tinodon
                    - - Amphitherium
                      - - Spalacotheriidae
                        - Zhangheotheriidae
