= Eotriconodon =

Eotriconodon Temporal range: Middle Jurassic ~168–165 Ma

Scientific classification
- Kingdom: Animalia
- Phylum: Chordata
- Class: Mammalia
- Order: †Eutriconodonta
- Family: †Triconodontidae
- Genus: †Eotriconodon; Butler & Sigogneau-Russell, 2016
- Species: †E. sophron

Binomial name
- †Eotriconodon sophron Butler & Sigogneau-Russell, 2016

Extinct genus of mammals

Eotriconodon sophron is an extinct mammal from the Bathonian of England. It has been found in the Kirtlington Mammal bed, a site in Oxfordshire that has wielded numerous mammal fossils.

== Description ==
The holotype is a right lower molar, M46736.

== Classification ==
Although originally compared to Triconodontidae, a more recent study has placed it alongside Sangarotherium and Indotriconodon as closely related to Volaticotherini.
