= Carnassial =

Mammal tooth type

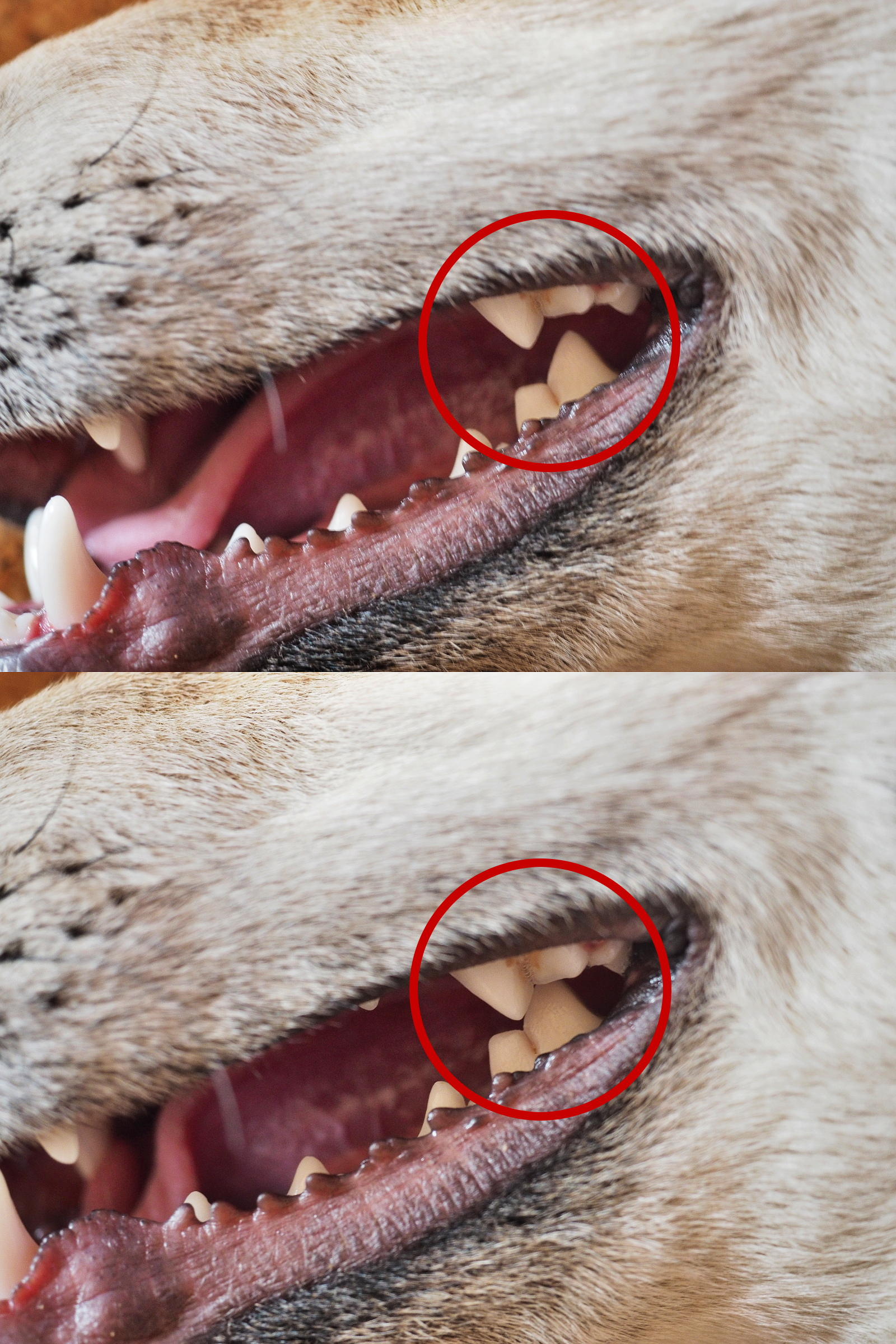
Carnassials of a dog

Carnassials are paired upper and lower teeth modified in such a way as to allow enlarged and often self-sharpening edges to pass by each other in a shearing manner. This adaptation is found in carnivorans, where the carnassials are the modified fourth upper premolar and the first lower molar. These teeth are also referred to as sectorial teeth.

== Taxonomy ==
The name carnivoran is applied to a member of the order Carnivora. Carnivorans possess a common arrangement of teeth called carnassials, in which the first lower molar and the last upper premolar possess blade-like enamel crowns that act similar to a pair of shears for cutting meat. This dental arrangement has been modified by adaptation over the past 60 million years for diets composed of meat, for crushing vegetation, or for the loss of the carnassial function altogether found in pinnipeds.

== Carnassial dentition ==
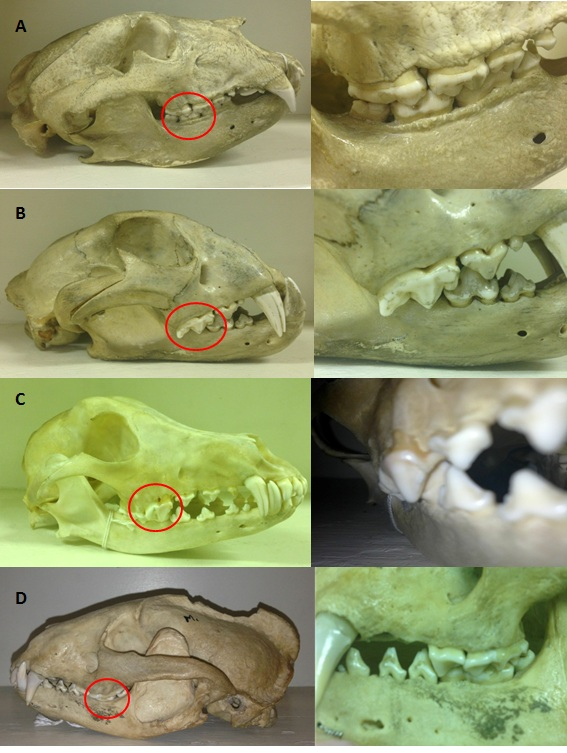
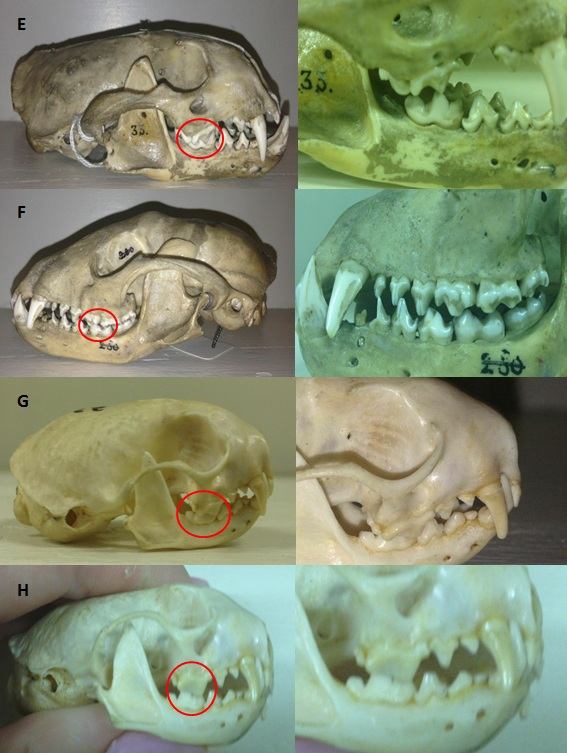
Left: Carnassial teeth of [A] bear (Ursus), [B] leopard (Panthera), [C] dog (Canis), [D] badger (Meles), and their respective close ups.
Right: Carnassial teeth of [E] otter (Lutra), [F] raccoon (Procyon), [G] mongoose (Herpestes), [H] weasel (Mustela), and their respective close-ups.
Photos taken at Imperial College London.

Carnassial teeth are modified molars (and in the case of carnivorans premolars) which are adapted to allow for the shearing (rather than tearing) of flesh to permit the more efficient consumption of meat. These modifications are not limited to the members of the order Carnivora, but are seen in a number of different mammal groups. Not all carnivorous mammals, however, developed carnassial teeth. Mesonychids, for example, had no carnassial adaptations, and as a result, the blunt, rounded cusps on its molars had a much more difficult time reducing meat. Likewise, neither members of Oxyclaenidae nor Arctocyonidae had carnassial teeth.

On the other hand, carnivorous marsupials have teeth of a carnassial form. Both the living Tasmanian devil (Sarcophilus harrisii) and the recently extinct Tasmanian wolf (Thylacinus cynocephalus) possessed modified molars to allow for shearing, although the Tasmanian wolf, the larger of the two, had dentition more similar to the dog. The Pleistocene marsupial lion (Thylacoleo carnifex) had massive carnassial molars. A recent study concludes that these teeth produced the strongest bite of any known land mammal in history. Moreover, these carnassial molars appear to have been used, unlike in any other known mammal, to inflict the killing blow to the prey by severing the spinal cord, crushing the windpipe or severing a major artery. Like these true marsupials, the closely related borhyaenids of South America had three carnassial teeth involving the first three upper molars (M1-M3) and the second through fourth lower molars (m2-m4). In the borhyaenids the upper carnassials appear to have been rotated medially around the anterior-posterior axis of the tooth row in order to maintain tight occlusional contact between the upper and lower shearing teeth.

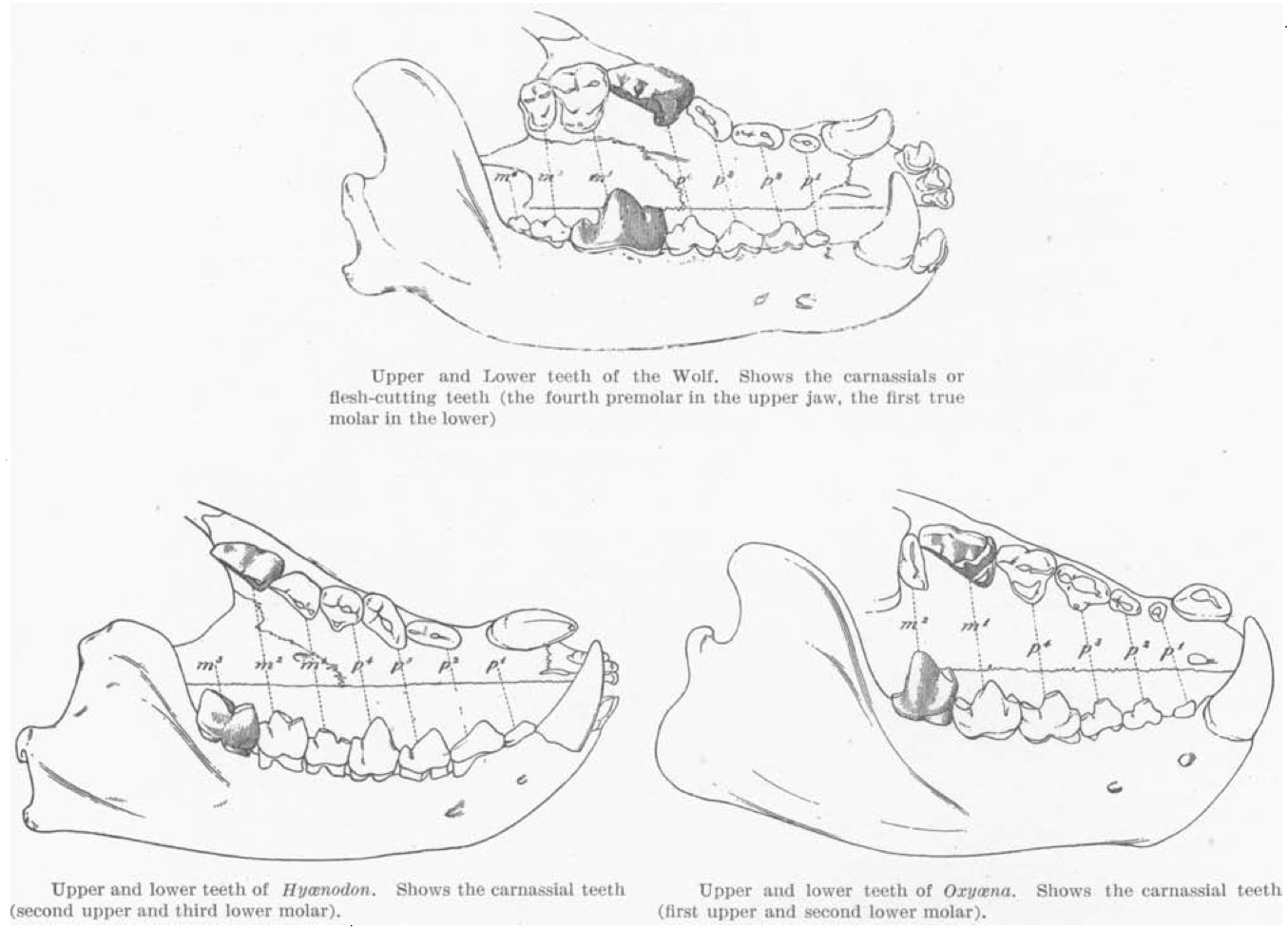
Comparison of carnassial teeth of wolf and typical hyaenodontid and oxyaenid

Creodonts had two or three pairs of carnassial teeth, but only one pair performed the cutting function: either M1/m2 or M2/m3, depending on the family. In Oxyaenidae, it is M1 and m2 that form the carnassials. Among the hyaenodontids it is M2 and m3. Unlike most modern carnivorans, in which the carnassials are the sole shearing teeth, in the creodonts other molars had a subordinate shearing function. The fact that the two lineages developed carnassials from different types of teeth has been used as evidence against the validity of Creodonta as a clade.

Modern carnivorous bats generally lack true carnassial teeth, but the extinct Necromantis had particularly convergent teeth, in particular M1 and M2, which bore expanded heels and broad stylar shelves. These were particularly suited for crushing over an exclusively slicing action.

Though not superficially similar, the triconodont teeth of some early mammals such as eutriconodonts are thought to have had a function similar to those of carnassials, sharing a similar shearing function. Eutriconodonts possess several speciations towards animalivory, and the larger forms such as Repenomamus, Gobiconodon and Jugulator probably fed on vertebrate prey. Similarly the "tooth lips" of clevosaurid sphenodontians such as Clevosaurus are described as "carnassial-like". A lineage of pycnodont fish also developed carnassials eerily convergent with those of modern carnivorans.

In modern carnivorans the carnassial teeth pairs are found on either side of the jaw and are composed of the fourth upper pre-molar and the first lower molar (P4/m1). The location these carnassial pairs is determined primarily by the masseter muscle. In this position, the carnassial teeth benefit from most of the force generated by this mastication muscle, allowing for efficient shearing and cutting of flesh, tendon and muscle.

The scissor-like motion is created by the movement between the carnassial pair when the jaw occludes. The inside of the fourth upper pre-molar closely passes by the outer surface of the first lower molar, thus allowing the sharp cusps of the carnassial teeth to slice through meat.

The length and size of the carnassial teeth vary between species, taking into account factors such as:

- the size of the carnivorous animal
- the extent to which the diet is carnivorous
- the size of the chunk of meat that can be swallowed.

Video demonstrating the shearing action of the carnassial teeth in a carnivoran jaw. Filmed at Imperial College London.

Video demonstrating the shearing action of carnassial teeth in a dog (Canis) jaw. Filmed at Imperial College London.

== Evolution of carnassial teeth ==
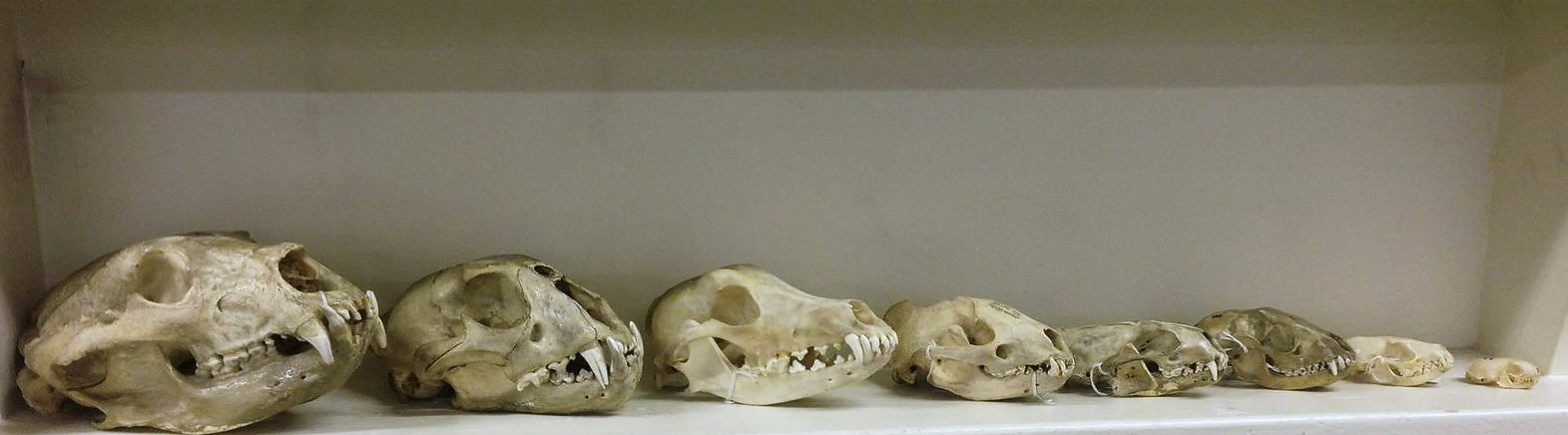
A comparison of the size and shape of carnassial teeth in: [A] bear (Ursus), [B] leopard (Panthera), [C] dog (Canis), [D] badger (Meles), [E] otter (Lutra), [F] raccoon (Procyon), [G] mongoose (Herpestes), [H] weasel (Mustela). Photo taken at Imperial College London.

The fossil record indicates the presence of carnassial teeth 50 million years ago, implying that Carnivora family members descend from a common ancestor.

The shape and size of sectorial teeth of different carnivorous animals vary depending on diet, illustrated by the comparisons of bear (Ursus) carnassials with those of a leopard (Panthera). Bears, being omnivores, have a flattened, more blunt carnassial pair than leopards. This reflects the bear's diet, as the flattened carnassials are useful both in slicing meat and grinding up vegetation, whereas the leopard's sharp carnassial pairs are more adapted for its hypercarnivorous diet. During the Late Pleistocene – early Holocene a now extinct hypercarnivorous wolf ecomorph existed that was similar in size to a large extant gray wolf but with a shorter, broader palate and with large carnassial teeth relative to its overall skull size. This adaptation allowed the megafaunal wolf to predate and scavenge on Pleistocene megafauna.

Cheetahs, Scimitar-toothed cats and Barbourofelis, have relatively elongated blade-like shape carnassials, with reduced lingual cusps. This may have been an adaptation to consume quickly the flesh of a prey before larger and stronger predators arrive to take it from them, either from other species or from their own group.

== Disease ==
Wear and cracking of the carnassial teeth in a wild carnivore (e.g. a wolf or lion) may result in the death of the individual due to starvation.

Carnassial teeth infections are common in domestic dogs. They can present as abscesses (a large swollen lump under the eye). Extraction or root canal procedure (with or without a crown) of the tooth is necessary to ensure that no further complications occur, as well as pain medication and antibiotics.
