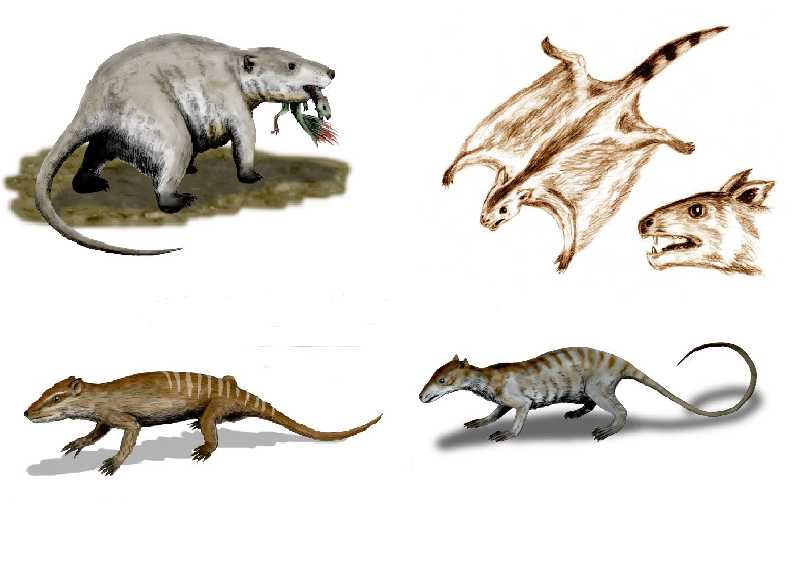
- Examples of several eutriconodonts. Clockwise: Repenomamus, Volaticotherium, Jeholodens and Yanoconodon. These occupy vastly different ecological niches: bulky semi-fossorial carnivore, glider, arboreal insectivore and terrestrial carnivore, respectively.

Scientific classification
- Kingdom: Animalia
- Phylum: Chordata
- Class: Mammalia
- Clade: Theriimorpha
- Order: †Eutriconodonta; Kermack et al., 1973

Subgroups
- †Amphidontidae; †Amphilestidae; ?†Bocaconodon; †Dongoconodon; ?†Dyskritodon; †Gobiconodontidae; †Jeholodentidae; †Klameliidae; †Liaoconodon; †Sangarotherium; ?†Taveirosaurus; †Indotriconodon; †Triconodontidae; †Volaticotherini

= Eutriconodonta =

Eutriconodonta Temporal range: Early Jurassic - Late Cretaceous, 184–66 Ma

Extinct order of mammals

Eutriconodonta is an order of early mammals. Eutriconodonts existed in Asia (including pre-contact India), Africa, Europe, North and South America during the Jurassic and the Cretaceous periods. The order was named by Kermack et al. in 1973 as a replacement name for the paraphyletic Triconodonta.

Traditionally seen as the classical Mesozoic small mammalian insectivores, discoveries over the years have shown them to be among the best examples of the diversity of mammals in this time period, including a vast variety of bodyplans, ecological niches and locomotion methods.

== Classification ==
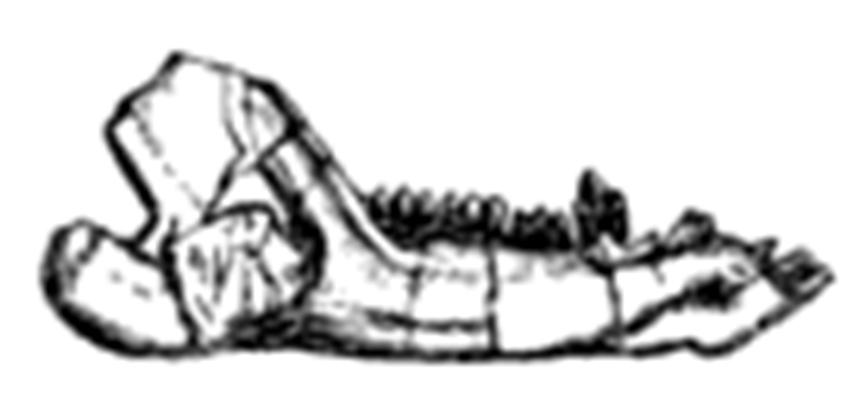
Illustration of the lower jaw of Triconodon mordax, 1861

"Triconodonta" had long been used as the name for an order of early mammals which were close relatives of the ancestors of all present-day mammals, characterized by molar teeth with three main cusps on a crown that were arranged in a row. The group originally included only the family Triconodontidae and taxa that were later assigned to the separate family Amphilestidae, but was later expanded to include other taxa such as Morganucodon or Sinoconodon. The phylogenetic analyses found that all these taxa did not form a natural group, and that some traditional "triconodonts" were more closely related to therian mammals than others. Some traditional "triconodonts" do seem to form a natural group (or "clade"), and this was given the name Eutriconodonta (or "true triconodonts").

Most analyses use only dental and mandibular characters. Gao et al. (2010) conducted a second analysis as well, using a modified version of the matrix from the analysis of Luo et al. (2007); this analysis involved a broader range of Mesozoic mammaliaforms and more characters, including postcranial ones. Both Luo et al. (2007) and the second analysis of Gao et al. (2010) recovered a more inclusive monophyletic Eutriconodonta that also contained gobiconodontids and Amphilestes; in the second analysis of Gao et al. it also contained Juchilestes (recovered as amphidontid in their first analysis, the only amphidontid included in their second analysis). However, Gao et al. (2010) stressed that jeholodentids and gobiconodontids are the only eutriconodonts with known postcranial skeletons; according to the authors, it remains uncertain whether the results of their second analysis represent true phylogeny or are merely "a by-product of long branch attraction of jeholodentids and gobiconodontids". Phylogenetic studies conducted by Zheng et al. (2013), Zhou et al. (2013) and Yuan et al. (2013) recovered monophyletic Eutriconodonta containing triconodontids, gobiconodontids, Amphilestes, Jeholodens and Yanoconodon.

The exact phylogenetic placement of eutriconodonts within Mammaliaformes is also uncertain. Zhe-Xi Luo, Zofia Kielan-Jaworowska and Richard Cifelli (2002) conducted an analysis that recovered eutriconodonts within the crown group of Mammalia, i.e. the least inclusive clade containing monotremes and therian mammals. The analysis found eutriconodonts to be more closely related to therian mammals than monotremes were, but more distantly than (paraphyletic) amphitheriids, dryolestids, spalacotheriid "symmetrodonts" and multituberculates were. This result was mostly confirmed by Luo et al. (2007), the second analysis of Gao et al. (2010), Zheng et al. (2013), Zhou et al. (2013) and Yuan et al. (2013), although in the phylogenies of Luo et al. (2007) and Yuan et al. (2013) eutriconodonts were in unresolved polytomy with multituberculates and trechnotherians. If confirmed this would make eutriconodonts one of the groups that can be classified as mammals by any definition. Several other extinct groups of Mesozoic animals that are traditionally considered to be mammals (such as Morganucodonta and Docodonta) are now placed just outside Mammalia by those who advocate a 'crown-group' definition of the word "mammal". However, Luo, Kielan-Jaworowska and Cifelli (2002) tested alternative possible phylogenies as well, and found that recovering eutriconodonts outside the crown group of Mammalia required only five additional steps compared to the most parsimonious solution. The authors stated that such placement of eutriconodonts is less likely than their placement within the mammalian crown group, but it cannot be rejected on a statistical basis.

The most recent cladogram is by Thomas Martin et al. 2015, in their description of Spinolestes. Eutriconodonts are recovered as a largely monophyletic group within Theriimorpha.

- Eutriconodonta
  - Amphilestidae
    - Phascolotherium
    - Amphilestes
  - - - Amphidontidae
        - Hakusanodon
        - Juchilestes
      - - Gobiconodontidae
          - Spinolestes
          - - Gobiconodon
            - Repenomamus
        - - Jeholodens
          - - Yanoconodon
            - - Liaoconodon
              - - Volaticotherini
                  - Volaticotherium
                  - Argentoconodon
                - Triconodontidae
                  - Trioracodon
                  - - Triconodon
                    - - Priacodon
                      - - Arundelconodon
                        - - Meiconodon
                          - - Astroconodon
                            - - Alticonodon
                              - Corviconodon

A 2020 study found them paraphyletic in regards to crown group Mammalia.

== Range ==
When eutriconodonts first appeared is unclear. The earliest remains come from the late Early Jurassic (Toarcian), but they already represent a variety of groups: the volaticotherian Argentoconodon, the alticonodontine Victoriaconodon and the gobiconodontid Huasteconodon, as well as the putative eutriconodont "Dyskritodon" indicus. They achieve their peak diversity across the Early Cretaceous, before largely disappearing from the fossil record in the early Late Cretaceous outside of North America. The Maastrichtian genus Indotriconodon is the youngest representative of the group, hailing from the intertrappean beds of India; the Campanian/Maastrichtian Austrotriconodon was originally referred to as a late surviving member of the clade, but has since been moved to Dryolestoidea.

Most eutriconodont remains occur in laurasian landmasses. The exceptions are Argentoconodon and slightly younger Condorodon from the Early Jurassic of Argentina, the putative Dyskritodon indicus from the Early Jurassic of India (Kota Formation), the Late Jurassic Tendagurodon from Tanzania (Tendaguru Formation), several Early Cretaceous north African taxa like Ichthyoconodon, Dyskritodon amazighi and Gobiconodon palaios, and Indotriconodon magnus from Late Cretaceous India. Due to the rarity of the Jurassic gondwanan fossil record the presence of eutriconodonts in southern landmasses may be of interest, due to their comparatively early age.

Eutriconodonts are among the few Mesozoic mammals present at Arctic locations; docodonts and haramiyidans (generally considered non-mammalian cynodonts) are also present, but not therians, dryolestoids and other groups considered true mammals.

== Biology ==
=== Anatomy ===
Like many other non-therian mammals, eutriconodonts retained classical mammalian synapomorphies like epipubic bones(which suggests Eutriconodonts gave birth to highly undevoloped young, like masurpials), venomous spurs and semi-sprawling limbs. However, the forelimb and shoulder anatomy of at least some species like Jeholodens are similar to those of therian mammals, though the hindlimbs remain more conservative. Eutriconodonts had a modern ear anatomy, the main difference from therians being that the ear ossicles were still somewhat connected to the jaw via the Meckel's cartilage. Uniquely among crown-group mammals, gobiconodontids replaced their molariform teeth by successors of similar complexity, while in other mammals less complex replacements are the norm.

=== Soft tissues ===
Some eutriconodonts like Spinolestes and Volaticotherium were very well preserved, showing evidence of fur, internal organs and, in the latter, of patagia. Spinolestes shows hair similar to that of modern mammals, with compound hair follicles with primary and secondary hair, even preserving traces of a pore infection. It also possesses a clear thoracic diaphragm like modern mammals, as well as spines, dermal scutes and an ossified Meckel's cartilage. Furthermore, Spinolestes may also display signs of dermatophytosis, suggesting that gobiconodontids, like modern mammals, were vulnerable to this type of fungal infection.

Triconodon itself has been the subject to cranial endocast studies, revealing a unique brain anatomy.

== Paleobiology ==
The eutriconodont triconodont dentition has no analogue among living mammals, so comparisons are difficult. There are two main types of occlusion patterns: one present in triconodontids (as well as the unrelated morganucodontan mammals), in which lower cusp "a" occludes anterior to upper cusp "A", between "A" and "B", and one present in amphilestids and gobiconodontids, in which the molars basically alternate, with the lower cusp "a" occluding further forward, near the junction between two upper molars. A study on Priacodon however, suggests that only the latter arrangement was present.

However, it is clear that most if not all eutriconodonts were primarily carnivorous, given the presence of long, sharp canines, (Note: In gobinocontids, though, the incisors are also long and fang-like; in Gobiconodon, the lower incisors outrightly replace the canines, which are vestigial.) premolars with trenchant main cusps that were well suited to grasp and pierce prey, strong development of the mandibular abductor musculature, bone crushing ability in at least some species and several other features. Eutriconodont teeth are known to have had a shearing function, allowing the animal to tear through flesh much like carnassial teeth of therian mammals. In a study about Mesozoic mammalian diets the taxa Repenomamus, Gobiconodon, Argentoconodon, Phascolotherium, Triconodon and Liaoconodon rank among carnivorous mammal species, while Volaticotherium, Liaotherium, Amphilestes and Jeholodens ranked among insectivorous mammals, while Yanoconodon, Priacodon and Trioracodon ranked somewhere in between. A study on Priacodon suggests that the jaw roll was more passive for eutriconodonts than modern therian carnivores.

Eutriconodonts displayed a broad size range from small shrew-like insectivores with body masses of as little as 2 grams (0.071 oz), comparable to the smallest known modern mammals, to large forms like Repenomamus, which is estimated to have had a body mass of 12–14 kilograms (26–31 lb), comparable to a badger. They were among the first mammals to be specialised for vertebrate prey, and likely occupied the highest trophic levels among mammals in their faunal communities. Several forms like Gobiconodon and Repenomamus show evidence of scavenging, being among the few Mesozoic mammals to have significantly exploited that. Evidence of predation on significantly larger dinosaurs is also known.

At least in carnivorous niches, eutriconodonts were probably replaced by deltatheroidean metatherians, which are the dominant carnivorous mammals in Late Cretaceous faunal assemblages. Competition between both groups is unattested, but in Asia the Early Cretaceous gobiconodontid diversity is replaced entirely by a deltatheroidean one, while in North America Nanocuris appears after the absence of Gobiconodon and other larger eutriconodonts. Given that all insectivorous and carnivorous mammals groups suffered heavy losses during the mid-Cretaceous, it seems likely these metatherians simply occupied niches left after the extinction of eutriconodonts in the northern continents.

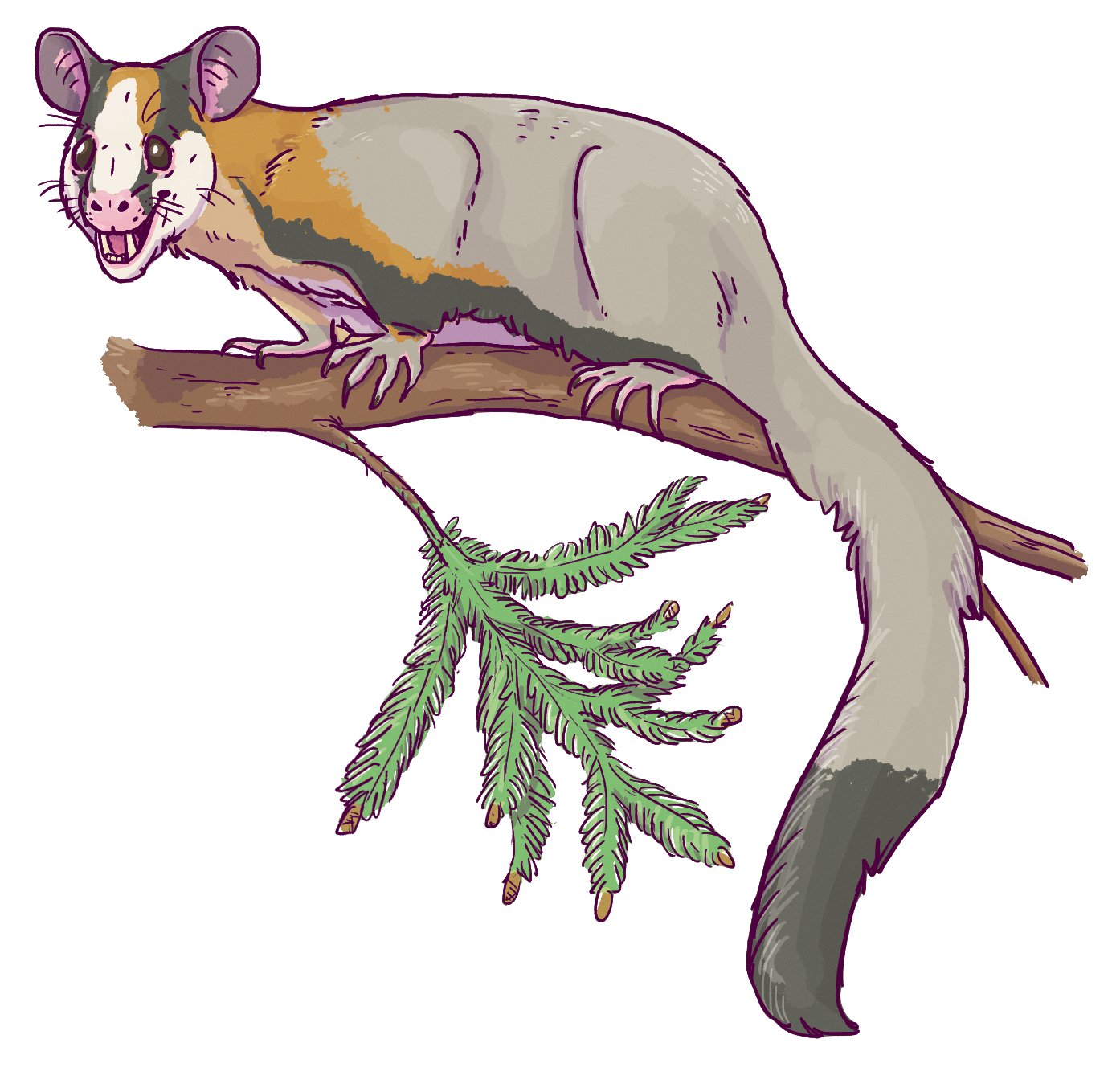
Volaticotherins, such as Volaticotherium are particularly notable for their specializations towards gliding.

Some eutriconodonts were instead among the most specialised of Mesozoic mammals. Several taxa like Astroconodon, Dyskritodon and Ichthyoconodon may show adaptations for piscivory and occur in aquatic settings with their molars being compared to those of seals and cetaceans. Caution has been advised in these comparisons, however; as many researchers like Zofia Kielan-Jaworowska have noted, eutriconodont molars are more functionally similar to those of terrestrial carnivorans than pinnipeds and cetaceans, occluding in a shearing motion instead of not-occluding and providing a grasping function. However, Dyskritodon and Ichthyoconodon's teeth shows no erosion associated with aquatic transportation, meaning that the animals died in situ or close. Studies on Liaoconodon show that it has adaptations for an aquatic lifestyle, possessing a barrel-like body and paddle-like limbs, and analysis of the postcrania of Yanoconodon shows adaptations towards multiple forms of locomotion, with traits in common with fossorial, arboreal, and semiaquatic mammals. Dongoconodon has been suggested to have been a semi-aquatic carnivore, based on its coypu-like flattened tail vertebrae and platypus-like webbed feet, with the tail probably being used only for maneuvering similar the coypu, with propulsion coming from the webbed forelimbs.

Additionally, Volaticotherium and Argentoconodon show adaptations for aerial gliding locomotion, in the case of the former including the preserved remains of a flying squirrel-like patagium membrane between the limbs. Both genera are closely related, implying a long lived lineage of gliding mammals.

At least Spinolestes had xenarthrous vertebrae and osseous scutes, convergent to those of modern xenarthrans and to a lesser extent the hero shrew. This genus may have displayed an ecological role similar to that of modern anteaters, pangolins, echidnas, aardvark, aardwolf and numbat, being the second known Mesozoic mammal after Fruitafossor to have done so.

=== Reproductive biology ===
Triconodon shows dental replacement patterns consistent with milk-drinking mammals.
