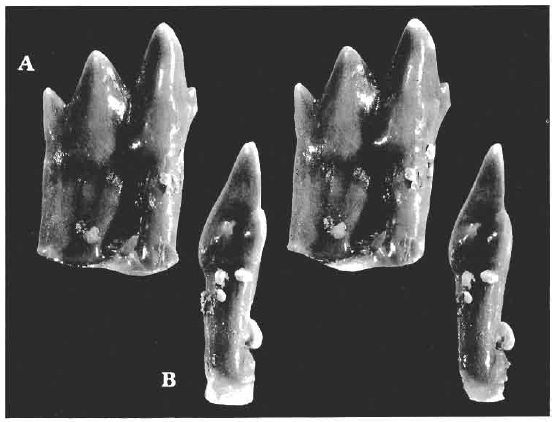
- Teeth of D. amazighi

Scientific classification
- Kingdom: Animalia
- Phylum: Chordata
- Class: Mammalia
- Order: †Eutriconodonta (?)
- Genus: †Dyskritodon; Sigogneau-Russell, 1995

Type species
- †Dyskritodon amazighi Sigogneau-Russell, 1995

Other species
- †D. indicus? Prasad & Manhas, 2002

= Dyskritodon =

Dyskritodon Temporal range: Early Cretaceous, 145–139 Ma

Extinct family of mammals

Dyskritodon ("tooth of unknown origin", from Greek δυσκρίτος, "dyskritos" (Note: The type species, D. amazighi, was named in honour of the Amazigh people, who "helped us (Denise Sigogneau-Russell & co) during the 1988 expedition".)) is a genus of extinct mammal from the Early Cretaceous of Morocco and possibly the Early Jurassic of India. Of uncertain affinities. It is tentatively described as a eutriconodont.

== Description ==
The type species, D. amazighi, is known from the Ksar Metlili Formation in the Atlas Mountains, dating to the Berriasian. It is known from several molars, about 1.85 mm long. These teeth are noted for being rather high and narrow crowned, bearing three main cusps that decrease in height posteriorly, as well as two minuscule mesial cusps.

D. indicus is known from a single lower molar tooth from the Kota Formation, dating to the Hettangian-Pliensbachian. It is very similar to D. amazighi, differing in being smaller (1.24 mm), having a shorter posterior root and some differences in the cusps. However, compared to D. amazighi molars, it is "drastically less complete".

== Classification ==
Sigogneau-Russell referred the genus to Eutriconodonta on the basis of its basic triconodont shape. However, she considered it aberrant enough to warrant a separate family within the clade. Further studies have similarly found it rather distinct from other eutriconodonts, and it is listed as an incertae sedis taxon. It is nonetheless more "advanced" than morganucodontids and other basal Mammaliformes.

Due to the large temporal distance between both species, different environments and general incompleteness of the Indian material, there is also doubt as to whereas D. indicus is closely related to D. amazighi. For now, its relationship to it is, too, provisory.

== Biology ==
As it was found in relative abundance in marine deposits, D. amazighi, like the contemporary Ichthyoconodon, has been suggested to be an aquatic piscivore. Similarities between its molars and those of mammals such as seals and cetaceans have corroborated this hypothesis. Posterior analysis have shown a lack of precise equivalency between eutriconodont molars and those of therian mammals, rending this assessment as a fish-eater cautious, but the high state of preservation of the animal's teeth indicates that it died in situ or nearby, in open waters.

D. indicus, by contrast, appears in a terrestrial environment.
