= Indotriconodon =

Indotriconodon Temporal range: 66 Ma

Scientific classification
- Kingdom: Animalia
- Phylum: Chordata
- Class: Mammalia
- Order: †Eutriconodonta
- Genus: †Indotriconodon; Bajpai et al., 2024
- Species: †I. magnus

Binomial name
- †Indotriconodon magnus Bajpai et al., 2024

Extinct species of mammal

Indotriconodon magnus is an extinct mammal from the Late Cretaceous of India. A eutriconodont, it represents the geologically youngest of the group dating to the Maastrichtian just a few thousand years before the K-Pg event (a record previously held by Alticonodon lindoei from the Campanian of Canada), as well as a relatively large sized Mesozoic mammal.

== Description ==
Indotriconodon magnus is known only from a single lower molar. It is about 20% smaller than that of Repenomamus giganticus but larger than that of other eutriconodonts, making it a badger-sized mammal.

== Phylogeny ==
In its 2024 description it nests deeply within Eutriconodonta, being sister taxa to Volaticotherini.

== Palaeoceology ==
Indotriconodon type locality in Anjar pit BG1, Kachchh, Gujarat, India

Found in the Intertrappean Beds, it co-existed with at least other ten mammal genera as well various squamates, turtles and dinosaurs. In this time, India was isolated from other landmasses, and had a unique island biota.
