= Condorodon =

Condorodon Temporal range: Middle Toarcian ~179.17–178.07 Ma

Scientific classification
- Kingdom: Animalia
- Phylum: Chordata
- Class: Mammalia
- Order: †Eutriconodonta
- Superfamily: †Amphilestheria
- Genus: †Condorodon; Gaetano & Rougier 2012

Species
- C. spanios Gaetano & Rougier 2012

Extinct genus of mammals

Condorodon is a genus of extinct mammals from the Lower Jurassic Cañadón Asfalto Formation of the Cañadón Asfalto Basin in Patagonia, Argentina. The type species is C. spanios, described by Gaetano and Rougier in 2012.

== Classification ==
One of the only two known South American eutriconodonts, Condorodon differs from the somewhat older Argentoconodon, a relative of Volaticotherium, in the morphology of the molariform teeth. It is closely related to the Late Jurassic amphilesthere Tendagurodon from the Tendaguru Formation of Tanzania, Africa.
