= Yanoconodon =

Yanoconodon Temporal range: Early Cretaceous, 122 Ma
- Fossil skeleton, Chaoyang Paleontological Museum

Scientific classification
- Kingdom: Animalia
- Phylum: Chordata
- Class: Mammalia
- Order: †Eutriconodonta
- Family: †Jeholodentidae
- Genus: †Yanoconodon; Chen, Chen, Li & Luo, 2007

Type species
- †Yanoconodon allini Chen, Chen, Li & Luo, 2007

Extinct family of mammals

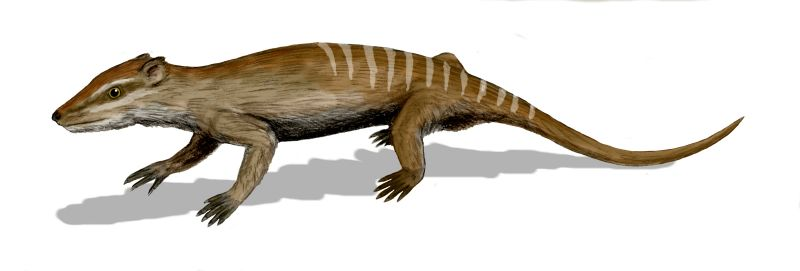
Life restoration

Yanoconodon is a monotypic genus of extinct early mammal whose representative species Yanoconodon allini lived during the Mesozoic in what is now China. The holotype fossil of Yanoconodon was excavated in the Yan Mountains about 300 kilometres from Beijing in the Qiaotou member of the Huajiying Formation (which the original authors considered part of the Yixian Formation) of Hebei Province, China, and is therefore of uncertain age. The Qiaotou Member may correlate with the more well-known Early Cretaceous Yixian Formation, and so probably dates to around 122 Ma ago.

Yanoconodon was a eutriconodont, a group composing most taxa once classified as "triconodonts" which lived during the time of the dinosaurs. These were a highly ecologically diverse group, including large sized taxa such as Repenomamus that were able to eat small dinosaurs, the arboreal Jeholodens, the aerial volaticotherines and the spined Spinolestes. Yanoconodon is inferred to be a generalized terrestrial mammal, capable of multiple forms of locomotion.

Yanoconodon's name is composed of two elements: 'Yan' is taken from the Yan Mountains in the north of the Hebei Province near where the holotype of Yanoconodon was found; 'Conodon' is an often used as a mammalian taxonomic suffix meaning 'cuspate tooth'. Its species name, "allini," is derived from mammalian researcher Edgar Allin, who was notable for his research on the mammalian middle ear.

== Description ==
Yanoconodon was a small mammal, barely 5 inches (13 centimetres) long. It had a semi-sprawling posture, and although previously inferred to be semi-aquatic, direct study of its postcrania indicates that Yanoconodon was likely a terrestrial mammal, and that it has features in common with digging, arboreal, and semiaquatic mammals. Yanocodon had lumbar ribs, a feature not seen in modern mammals. The closely related eutriconodont Jeholodens lacks these lumbar ribs, and it has been suggested that this morphological difference is due to changes in the Hox genes, specifically in the Hox10 group. In mice, a triple mutation knocking out all Hox10 genes leads to the presence of lumbar ribs, supporting the theory that these genes have evolved the ability to repress the ancestral lumbar morphology seen in the Eutriconodonts.

The Yanoconodon holotype is so well preserved that scientists were able to examine tiny bones of the middle ear. These are of particular interest because of their "transitional" state: Yanoconodon has fundamentally modern middle ear bones, but these are still attached to the jaw by an ossified Meckel's cartilage. This is a feature retained from earlier stem mammals, and illustrates the transition from a basal tetrapod jaw and ear, to a mammalian one in which the middle ear bones are fully separate from the jaw. Despite this feature Yanoconodon is a true mammal. It is thought that the feature was retained during early embryo development, whereas it is lost in most other mammal groups. The intermediate anatomy of the middle ear of Yanocodon is said to be a "Rosetta Stone" of mammalian middle ear evolution.
