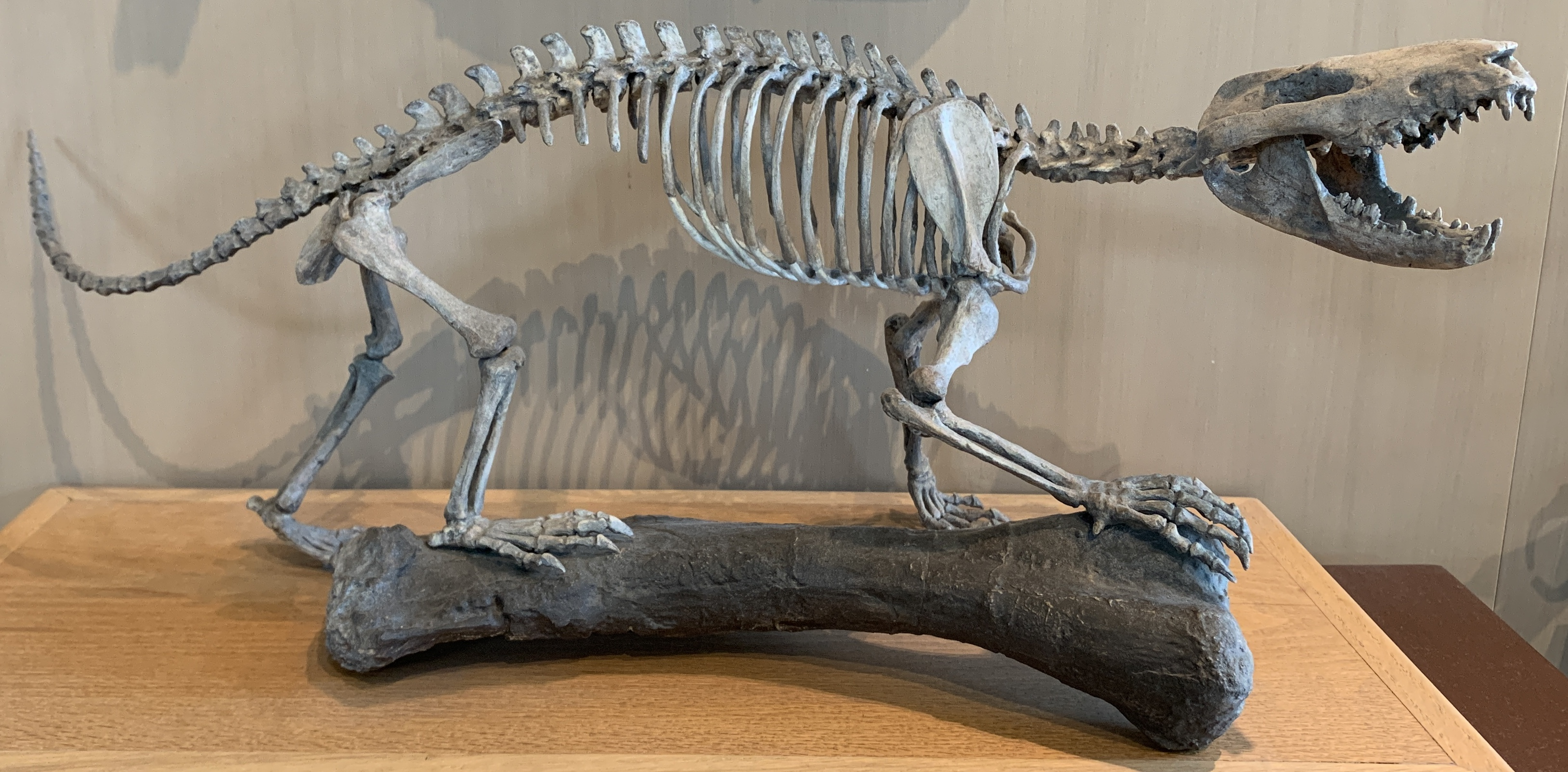
- Gobiconodon ostromi cast of a specimen from Crow Indian Reservation, Montana. At the AMNH.

Scientific classification
- Kingdom: Animalia
- Phylum: Chordata
- Class: Mammalia
- Order: †Eutriconodonta (?)
- Family: †Gobiconodontidae
- Genus: †Gobiconodon; Trofimov, 1978

Species
- G. bathoniensis? Sigogneau-Russell, 2016; G. borissiaki Trofimov, 1978 (type); G. gongzhulingensis Wu et al., 2026; G. haizhouensis Kusuhashi et al., 2015; G. hoburensis (Trofimov, 1978); G. hopsoni Rougier et al., 2001; G. luoianus? Yuan et al., 2009; G. ostromi Jenkins Jr. & Schaff, 1988; G. palaios? Sigogneau-Russell, 2003; G. tomidai Kusuhashi et al., 2015; G. zofiae Li et al., 2003

Synonyms
- Guchinodon Trofimov, 1978; Neoconodon (nomen nudum)

= Gobiconodon =

Gobiconodon Temporal range: Berriasian–Turonian Possible Bathonian record

Extinct genus of mammals

Gobiconodon is an extinct genus of carnivorous mammals (or possibly non-mammalian mammaliaforms) belonging to the family Gobiconodontidae. Undisputed records of Gobiconodon are restricted to the Early Cretaceous of Asia and North America, but isolated teeth attributed to the genus have also been described from formations in England and Morocco dating as far back as the Middle Jurassic. Species of Gobiconodon varied considerably in size, with G. ostromi, one of the larger species, being around the size of a modern Virginia opossum. Like other gobiconodontids, it possessed several speciations towards carnivory, such as shearing molariform teeth, large canine-like incisors and powerful jaw and forelimb musculature, indicating that it probably fed on vertebrate prey. Unusually among predatory mammals and other eutriconodonts, the lower canines were vestigial, with the first lower incisor pair having become massive and canine-like. Like the larger Repenomamus there might be some evidence of scavenging.

== Discovery and naming ==
In 1978, the species Gobiconodon borissiaki and Guchinodon hoburensis were described by the Soviet palaeontologist B. A. Trofimov, based on remains from the Khoboor beds (Dzunbain Formation) of the Mongolian Gobi Desert, which date to the Aptian to Albian ages of the Early Cretaceous. The specimens were found during a 1969–1973 Soviet-Mongolian palaeontological expedition to the area. The Gobiconodon borissiaki material consisted of the holotype, a partial right dentary bone, and fragments of eight other dentaries and two maxillae. Guchinodon hoburensis was represented only by its holotype, a single partial right dentary. Later expeditions to the area have found several more jaw fragments of both species. In 1998, Guchinodon hoburensis was reassigned to Gobiconodon by Kielan-Jaworowska and Dashzeveg, making Guchinodon a junior synonym of that genus.

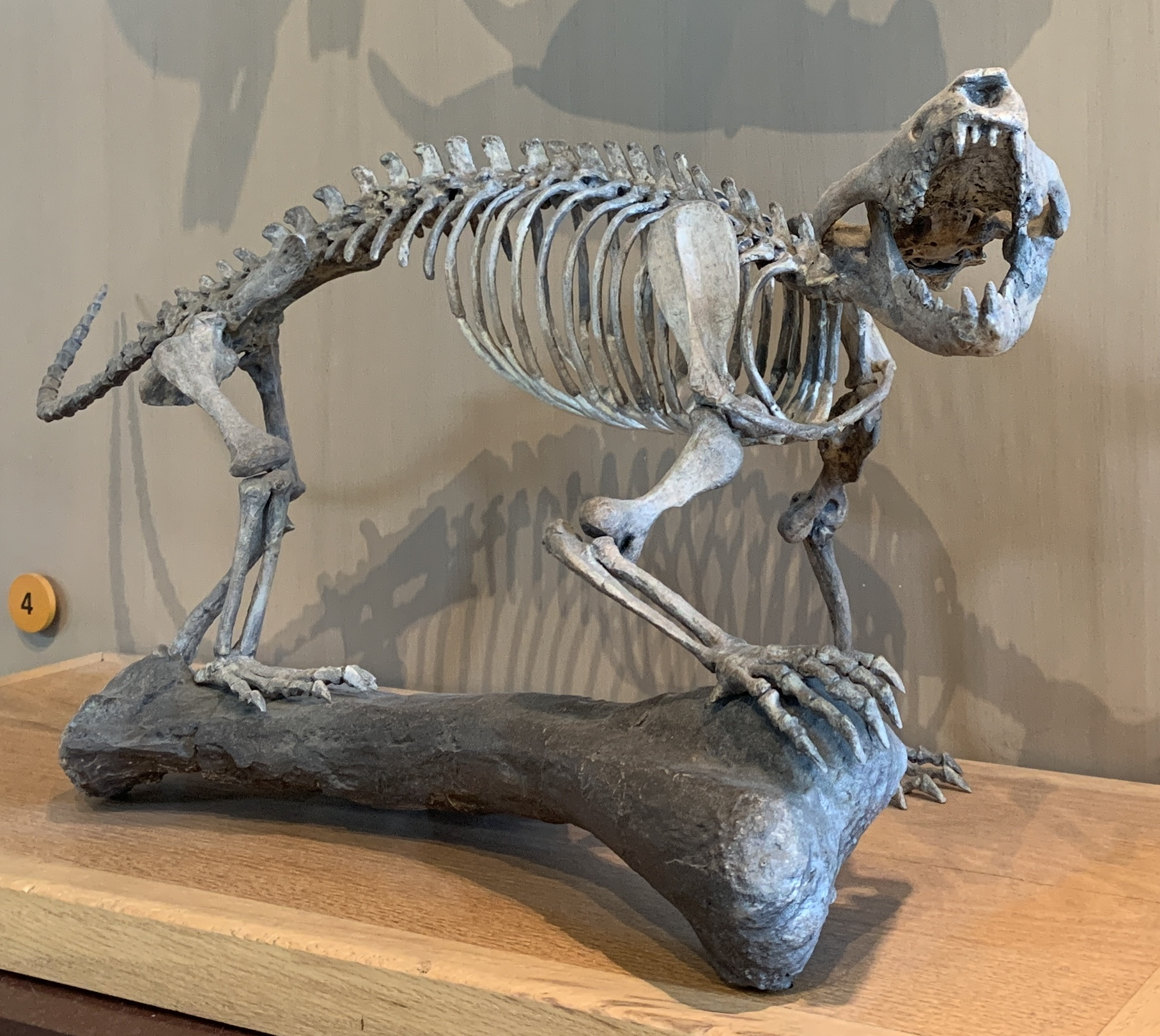
G. ostromi cast, at the AMNH.

G. ostromi

Gobiconodon ostromi, from the Aptian–Albian Cloverly Formation of the US state of Montana, was described in 1988 by Farish A. Jenkins and Charles R. Schaff. It is represented by two partial skeletons preserving both cranial and postcranial elements. The holotype, MCZ 19965, consists of both sides of the dentary, as well as several postcranial bones. The referred specimen MCZ 19860 contains both sides of the dentary and parts of the upper jaw, cranium, vertebrae, ribs, shoulders, pelvis and limbs. The specific epithet honours the American palaeontologist John Ostrom for his studies on the Cloverly Formation.

G. hopsoni

Gobiconodon hopsoni, from the Early Cretaceous (Berriasian–Barremian) Öösh Formation of Mongolia, was described in 2001 by Guillermo W. Rougier, Michael J. Novacek, Malcolm McKenna and John R. Wible. The holotype, PSS-MAE 140, consists of a partial right maxilla preserving the fourth molariform and parts of the second and third molariforms. The referred specimen PSS-MAE 139 consists of a part of the right dentary bone preserving an unerupted molariform and sockets for two other teeth. Two additional specimens from the same locality, both represented by dentary fragments, were at first described merely as Gobiconodon sp., but not assigned to any species. The specimens were eventually assigned to G. hopsoni in a 2015 paper by Alexey Lopatin and Alexander Averianov. The species is named after the palaeontologist James A. Hopson.

G. palaios

Gobiconodon palaios, from the Early Cretaceous (possibly Berriasian) of Morocco, was described in 2003 by Denise Sigogneau-Russell. It is based on isolated upper molariforms and possible premolariforms. The molariforms were assigned to the genus Gobiconodon due to their slightly triangulated cusp arrangement. According to Lopatin & Averianov (2015), this feature is not unique to this genus, but is also found in other genera like Repenomamus and the "amphilestid" Juchilestes. According to these authors, G. palaios may be synonymous with Kryptotherium polysphenos, another species found at the same locality, which is known only from lower teeth.

G. zofiae

Gobiconodon zofiae was described in 2003 by Li Chuankui, Wang Yuanqing, Hu Yaoming and Meng Jin. The holotype, IVPP V12585, is based on a single skull and lower jaw found near the village of Lujiatun in the province of Liaoning in Northeast China. The rocks in which the species was found belong to the basal member of the Yixian Formation, and have been dated to the Barremian age of the Early Cretaceous. The species is named after the Polish palaeontologist Zofia Kielan-Jaworowska. According to Lopatin & Averianov (2015), G. zofiae possesses no features clearly distinguishing it from G. hopsoni of Mongolia, but they provisionally retained it as a valid taxon until more material of the two species is discovered.

G. luoianus

Gobiconodon luoianus was described in 2009 by Yuan Chongxi, Xu Li, Zhang Xingliao, Xi Yunhong, Wu Yanhua and Ji Qiang based on material found near Lujiatun, in the same member of the Yixian Formation that yielded G. zofiae. It is known from a single specimen, 41H III-0320, consisting of a nearly complete skull with well-preserved upper and lower teeth. The species is named after the Chinese palaeontologist Zhe-Xi Luo. Lopatin & Averianov (2015) disputed the validity of this species, suggesting that it represents a junior synonym of G. zofiae.

G. haizhouensis and G. tomidai

Gobiconodon haizhouensis and Gobiconodon tomidai were described in 2015 by Nao Kusuhashi, Wang Yuanqing, Li Chuankui and Jin Xun. Both species are from the Early Cretaceous (Aptian to Albian) of the Liaoning province of China. G. haizhouensis is known from a single specimen (IVPP V14509) from the Fuxin Formation, consisting of a nearly complete right dentary. The species is named after Haizhou, an old name for the town of Fuxin where the type specimen was found. Lopatin (2017) commented that G. haizhouensis has no valid characteristics distinguishing it from the Mongolian species G. hoburensis, but did not formally synonymise the two.

G. tomidai is known from one specimen (IVPP V14510) from the Shahai Formation, consisting of an incomplete right dentary. The species is named after the Japanese palaeontologist Yukimitsu Tomida.

G. bathoniensis

Gobiconodon bathoniensis was described in 2016 by Percy M. Butler and Denise Sigogneau-Russell based on materials found in the Forest Marble Formation of England, which is dated to the Bathonian age of the Late Jurassic. The holotype (NHMUK PV M 46527) consists of an upper right molariform from the Old Cement Works Quarry of Kirtlington, Oxfordshire. Other specimens include two upper left molariforms from Kirtlington and a possible upper right molariform from Swyre, Dorset. As with G. palaios, the attribution of G. bathoniensis to the genus Gobiconodon is based mainly on the triangulated cusps of the teeth. A 2020 paper by Kusuhashi et al. therefore recommended that its attribution to Gobiconodon should be reexamined.

Other material assigned to Gobiconodon

In 2005, two new species of Gobiconodon were described based on material from the Bol'shoi Kemchug 3 locality in the Krasnoyarsk Krai of Russia, which belongs to the Early Cretaceous Ilek Formation. Both species are based on isolated teeth and/or jaw fragments, and were described in open nomenclature as Gobiconodon sp. A and B. Two indeterminate species of the genus of distinct size have also been reported from the Early Cretaceous Batylykh Formation in Yakutia, Russia, which represents the northernmost record of the genus.

In 2006, an isolated premolariform tooth from Barremian-aged strata of the Wessex Formation of England was described as possibly belonging to Gobiconodon. The tooth has a mostly symmetrical crown with three cusps, and a single, strongly curved root. Lopatin & Averianov (2015) disputed the assignment of this tooth to Gobiconodon, as it differs markedly from typical Gobiconodon premolariforms. Teeth from the Early Cretaceous Angeac-Charente bonebed in France have also been referred to the genus, though like the British specimens, their placement in the genus has been questioned because they lack tricuspid premolars.

== Description ==
Different species of Gobiconodon ranged from small to medium-sized. G. ostromi, one of the largest and most well-preserved species of Gobiconodon, had a skull length of around 10 centimetres (3.9 in) and an estimated presacral body length of around 35 centimetres (14 in), making it comparable to a modern Virginia opossum. Size may not be a reliable way of distinguishing between species of Gobiconodon, as the animal is thought to have had a long, protracted growth period compared to extant mammals.

=== Skull ===
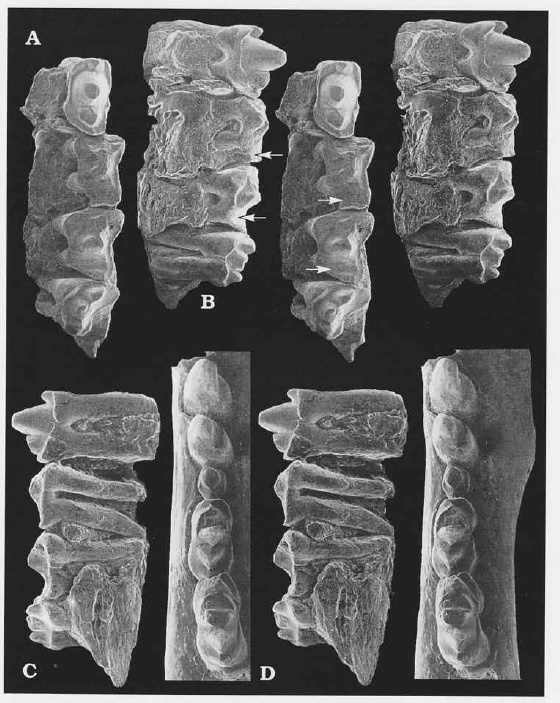
Jaw bones and teeth of G. borissiaki

Most Gobiconodon species are known from highly incomplete skull material, usually only preserving parts of the jaws. The species G. zofiae and its possible synonym G. luoianus are known from more complete skulls. Material from those species shows that Gobiconodon had a somewhat narrow skull roof with a flat upper surface. The suture between the frontal and parietal bones was V-shaped. The sagittal crest was short and low. At the rear end of the skull, the lambdoidal crest was turned forwards, rendering the occiput visible from above. Unusually, part of the lower border of the eye socket appears to have been formed by the maxilla, as there was seemingly no connection between the lacrimal and jugal bones in this region. The zygomatic arches are badly preserved in most specimens, but are complete in the holotype of G. luoianus. In this specimen, the zygomatic arch was mostly straight, and had a protuberance near the front end. On the palate, there was a set of large depressions located next to the upper molariforms, and a smaller one next to the final premolariform. These depressions would have housed the teeth of the lower jaw when the mouth was closed. On the braincase, the anterior lamina of the petrosal bone bore a large foramen (hole), which may have served as a common exit for the maxillary (V2) and mandibular (V3) branches of the trigeminal nerve.

The lower jaw was formed mostly by the dentary bone. The mandibular symphysis (the joint between the two halves of the dentary) was unfused. The coronoid process was tall and backwards-pointing. The masseteric fossa was large and rather deep. Jenkins & Schaff (1988) identified a facet for the coronoid bone in G. ostromi, but this seems to be absent in some of the other species. Unlike in more basal cynodonts, the middle ear bones were not attached directly to the dentary, and a postdentary trough for the attachment of these bones was therefore absent. Unlike in modern therians and monotremes, there was however still an indirect connection between the middle ear and the jaw, formed by an ossified (bony) Meckel's cartilage. Meckel's cartilage was housed in a Meckelian groove which ran along the inner surface of the dentary. Like other eutriconodonts, Gobiconodon lacked an angular process at the rear end of the dentary.

=== Dentition ===
Gobiconodon and other gobiconodontids can be distinguished from their relatives by their specialised anterior (front) dentition. The incisors, canines and anterior premolariforms were all rather simple, conical teeth; accordingly, it is debated how many teeth of each type were present. For consistency, the interpretation by Lopatin & Averianov (2015) is followed here; these authors interpreted Gobiconodon as having 3 incisors, 1 canine and 2 premolariforms in both the upper and lower jaws.

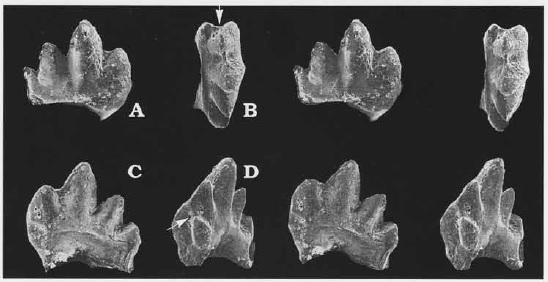
Lower molariform of G. hoburensis

As most Gobiconodon specimens consist of dentary fragments, the lower dentition is better known than the upper. The incisors and canine were all single-rooted. The first lower incisor (i1) was large and strongly procumbent (forwards-pointing). The second incisor (i2) was also procumbent, but was smaller than the first one. The third incisor (i3) and canine (c) were smaller and less procumbent than the first two incisors. The first premolariform (p1) was rather similar to the last incisor and canine, being dominated by a large main cusp. In some specimens, there was a second relatively large cusp located distally to (behind) the main cusp, but in other specimens this cusp was much smaller. The premolariforms with prominent distal cusps may represent deciduous teeth and be labelled as dp1. The first premolariform was single-rooted in most species, but double-rooted in G. tomidai. The second premolariform was more complex than p1, bearing three well-developed cusps. This tooth was possibly not replaced in Gobiconodon, and in some specimens the tooth is missing and the socket is filled with bone. As a result, the second premolariform may be considered a deciduous tooth and labelled as dp2. The second premolariform was double-rooted in some species, like G. hoburensis, but single-rooted in others like G. borissiaki.

Unlike the anterior dentition, the molariforms of Gobiconodon were relatively unspecialised. There were 5 molariforms in both the upper and lower jaws. The lower molariforms had a typical "triconodont" shape quite similar to that of the "amphilestids", with three large main cusps arranged in a straight line. The middle cusp (cusp a) was the largest, while the front cusp (cusp b) and rear cusp (cusp c) were smaller. Cusps b and c were similar in size, but one of the cusps was often slightly bigger than the other. The size ratio between the main cusps varied depending on species and tooth generation. The lower molariforms bore a cingulum on the lingual (inner) side, which could either be continuous or be divided into two parts in the middle. On the cingulum, there was a small cusp d behind cusp c. In front of cusp b there were two cingular cusps e and f, which often were reduced to small ridges, though cusp e could be more prominent in some of the teeth. The molariforms had an interlocking mechanism in which cusp d of one tooth fit into a groove formed by cusps e and f of the tooth behind it. The upper molariforms were similar to the lower ones in overall shape, having a central cusp A flanked by smaller cusps B and C. Unlike the lower teeth, the upper molariforms had a continuous cingulum fully encircling the tooth. The cusps of the first two upper molariforms (M1–M2) were lineally arranged like in the lower teeth, but M3–M5 differed in that the three main cusps were slightly triangulated, with the central cusp A being located more lingually than the side cusps B and C. The occlusion between the upper and lower molariforms is thought to have been similar to that of other eutriconodonts, with the central cusp (A/a) fitting between two of the opposing molariforms.

== Classification ==
Before their formal description, the remains of the type species Gobiconodon borissiaki were interpreted as belonging to the family Triconodontidae, but they were assigned to Amphilestidae in the describing paper. In 1984, the subfamily Gobiconodontinae was erected within Amphilestidae, in which the genera Gobiconodon, Guchinodon and Klamelia were included. In 1988, Gobiconodontinae was raised to family rank as Gobiconodontidae. In later decades, multiple new genera have been assigned to Gobiconodontidae, including Fuxinoconodon, Hangjinia, Meemannodon and Repenomamus from China, and Spinolestes from Spain. Huasteconodon, from the Early Jurassic of Mexico, was also assigned to Gobiconodontidae when first described, but its inclusion within the family has been disputed.

Along with other gobiconodontids, Gobiconodon has often been placed within Eutriconodonta, a group characterised by their "triconodont" molariforms with cusps placed in a straight line. Phylogenetic analyses have often found eutriconodonts to be closer to therians (the group containing marsupials and placentals) than to monotremes, but they are sometimes alternatively placed outside the mammalian crown group (the clade formed by monotremes and therians), within the larger clade Mammaliaformes. Some analyses have found Eutriconodonta to be a monophyletic group containing all descendants of their common ancestor, while others recover it as a paraphyletic grade ancestral to Trechnotheria and other more derived groups.

== Palaeobiology ==
=== Tooth replacement ===
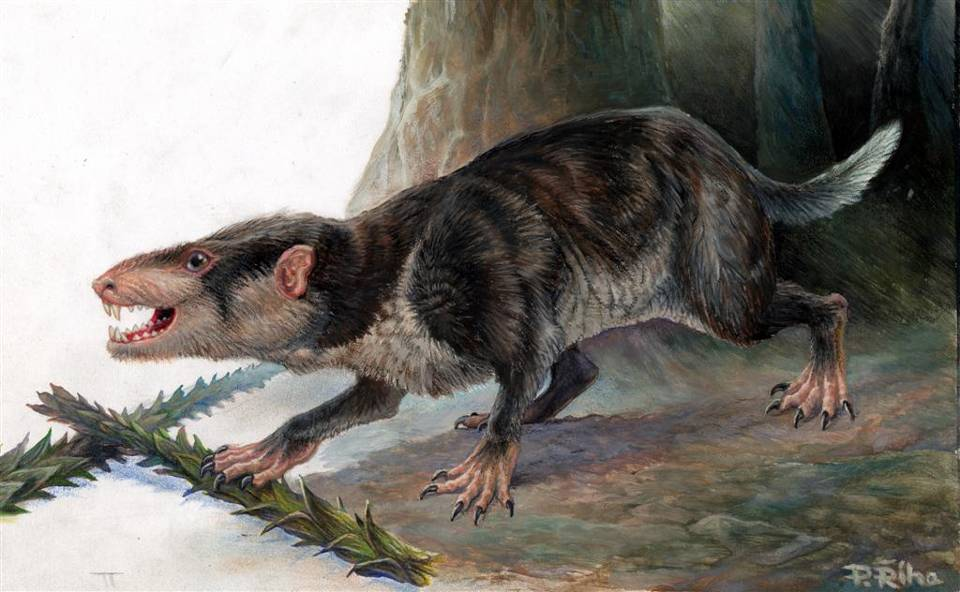
Life restoration

The postcanines (teeth behind the canine) of Gobiconodon can be divided into two types depending on their shape. The ones in front were relatively simple, and are classified as premolariforms. The ones further back were more complex, and are known as molariforms. The terms premolariform and molariform should not be confused with the terms premolar and molar, which are based on tooth replacement rather than shape. Premolars are generally replaced once, while molar teeth by definition are not replaced at all. In Gobiconodon, however, most or all of the molariforms were replaced, technically making them premolars rather than molars by that definition. Molariform replacement was first observed in G. ostromi, which preserves molariforms of one generation in the process of replacing molariforms of the previous generation, and has been determined in other Gobiconodon species through indirect evidence such as tooth wear patterns. In 2022, direct evidence of molariform replacement was also described in a specimen of G. borissiaki. Some species of Gobiconodon have been inferred to have replaced some of their molariforms twice, with G. borissiaki replacing the first two and G. ostromi replacing the first three. Replacement of a tooth position more than one time is known as polyphyodonty and is rare in extant mammals. The extensive replacement of molariforms may be related to the animal's relatively large size, with larger species like G. ostromi replacing their teeth more times than smaller species like G. hoburensis. Molariform replacement has also been observed in the other gobiconodontids Repenomamus and Spinolestes, indicating that it may be a general feature of the group.
