= Postdentary trough =

The postdentary trough is a skeletal feature seen in Mesozoic mammals. It is found on the inside of the lower jaw (dentary), at the back behind the molar teeth. It is the hollow in which the postdentary bones and Meckel's cartilage sit. These bones form the middle ear in later mammal groups (see Evolution of mammalian auditory ossicles); they include the incus (quadrate), malleus (articular), ectotympanic (angular) and prearticular.

In Mesozoic mammals these bones gradually change position and size until they are incorporated in the middle ear.
