= Amphilestidae =

Amphilestidae Temporal range: 168–93 Ma

Scientific classification
- Domain: Eukaryota
- Kingdom: Animalia
- Phylum: Chordata
- Class: Mammalia
- Order: †Eutriconodonta
- Family: †Amphilestidae; Osborn, 1888

Genera
- Amphilestes Owen, 1871; Kemchugia; Kryptotherium; Liaotherium; Phascolotherium Owen, 1838

Extinct family of mammals

Amphilestidae is a family of Mesozoic mammals, generally regarded as eutriconodonts. They may form a paraphyletic or polyphyletic assemblage, though they share with gobiconodontids their similar tooth occlusion patterns and may be especially closely related to them. They occur from the Middle Jurassic to Cenomanian, and have a distribution across Laurasia.

The putative amphilestid Tendagurodon is considered a non-amphilestid member of Amphilestheria along with the newly described Condorodon by Gaetano and Rougier (2012).
