= Meiconodon =

Meiconodon Temporal range: Lower Cretaceous

Scientific classification
- Domain: Eukaryota
- Kingdom: Animalia
- Phylum: Chordata
- Class: Mammalia
- Order: †Eutriconodonta
- Family: †Triconodontidae
- Subfamily: †Alticonodontinae
- Genus: †Meiconodon; Kusuhashi, Hu, Wang, Hirasawa and Matsuoka, 2009

Species
- M. lii Kusuhashi et al., 2009; M. setoguchii Kusuhashi et al., 2009

Extinct genus of mammals

Meiconodon is an extinct genus of alticonodontine triconodontid which existed in China during the early Cretaceous period (Aptian/Albian age). It was described by Nao Kusuhashi, Yaoming Hu, Yuanqing Wang, Satoshi Hirasawa and Hiroshige Matsuoka in 2009 and the type species is Meiconodon lii.
