= Astroconodon =

Astroconodon Temporal range: 112–94 Ma

Scientific classification
- Kingdom: Animalia
- Phylum: Chordata
- Class: Mammalia
- Order: †Eutriconodonta
- Family: †Triconodontidae
- Subfamily: †Alticonodontinae
- Genus: †Astroconodon; Patterson, 1951

Type species
- †Astroconodon denisoni Patterson, 1951

Species
- †A. delicatus; †A. denisoni

Extinct family of mammals

Astroconodon is an extinct genus of mammal from the Cretaceous of North America. Part of Eutriconodonta, it was a small sized predator, either a terrestrial insectivore and carnivore, or a semi-aquatic piscivore.

It is the first Cretaceous eutriconodont found.

== Description ==
The type species is A. denisoni. Known from the Antlers Formation, its type specimen, FMNH PM 542, was first described by Bryan Patterson in 1951. It is a generally rather common species, known from a large quantity of isolated teeth, exhibiting a high degree of variability. Its molars are on average 0.59 to 2 millimeters long, and the distal ones see a marked increase in crown height.

A second species, A. delicatus, was later found in the Cedar Mountain Formation. Its type locality is Mussentuchit (OMNH V239). It is smaller than A. denisoni by approximately 80%, and it differs from it, and most North American triconodontids, by lacking a lingual cingulid on the lower molars and premolars.

A third species, currently unnamed, is known from the Twin Mountains Formation. Not much has been said about it.

== Phylogeny ==
Always identified as a "triconodont" mammal, recent studies have recovered it as a triconodontid eutriconodont, as most closely related to Alticonodon and Corviconodon (these are in turn each other's sister taxa).

== Biology ==
Because of its abundance on lake and estuary deposits and particular association with fish-rich areas, it has been suggested that Astroconodon was an aquatic piscivore, an assertion reinforced by a perceived functional similarity between its molars and those of cetaceans and pinnipeds. Other researchers like Zofia Kielan-Jaworowska, however, were not convinced, noting that eutriconodont dentition cannot be easily compared to placental dentation, and that they generally have a shearing function as opposed to the non-occluding, grasping teeth of marine mammals. The prevalence on aquatic deposits, per her own words, "may well be real, but its significance is not clear", as like many other species found in fluvial deposits it may have simply been a terrestrial species whose remains were carried over by the waters, though she does cite Goldberg 2000 and recognises that there are stratifications of aquatic and terrestrial species to be noted.

Terrestrial or aquatic, Astroconodon, like most eutriconodonts, was almost certainly a predator. Like in most eutriconodonts, its triconodont molars were adapted for shearing, much ike the carnassials of therian carnivores.

== Palaeoecology ==
Astroconodon occurs in several fossil formations, most depicting wetland and delta environments. In both the Antlers Formation and the Cedar Mountain Formation it occurs alongside iconic dinosaurs such as Tenontosaurus and Deinonychus, and in former it co-exists with a wide variety of other mammals including two other eutriconodonts, the considerably larger Jugulator amplissimus and closely related Corviconodon utahensis, as well as many multituberculates and therians.
