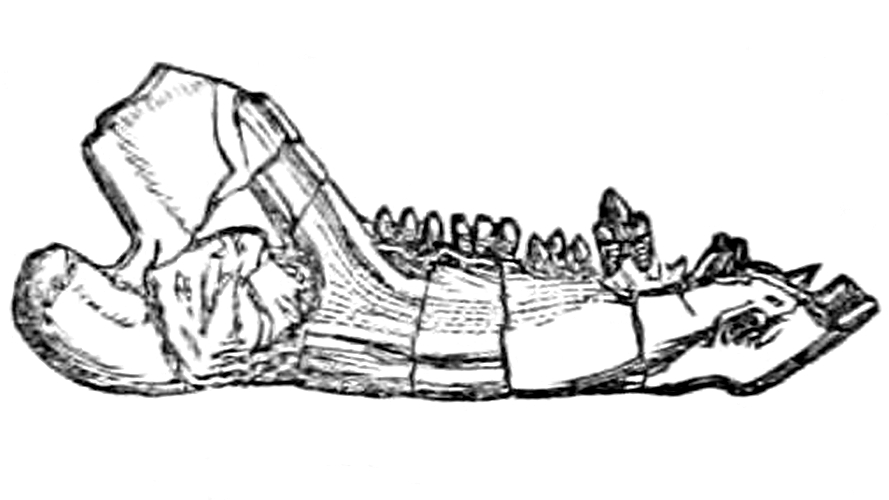
- Triconodon mordax jaw, Richard Owen 1861

Scientific classification
- Kingdom: Animalia
- Phylum: Chordata
- Class: Mammalia
- Order: †Eutriconodonta
- Family: †Triconodontidae; Marsh, 1887

Subgroups
- †Eotriconodon; †Indotriconodon?; †Priacodon; †Triconodon (type); †Trioracodon; †Victoriaconodon; †Alticonodontinae; †Alticonodon; †Arundelconodon; †Astroconodon; †Corviconodon; †Jugulator; †Meiconodon; †Volaticotherini?

= Triconodontidae =

Triconodontidae Temporal range: Middle Jurassic - Late Cretaceous, 190–66 Ma

Extinct family of mammals

Triconodontidae is an extinct family of small, carnivorous mammals belonging to the order Eutriconodonta, living in what would become Asia, Europe, North America and probably also Africa and South America during the Jurassic through Cretaceous periods at least from 190–66 mya.

Triconodontids can be distinguished from other eutriconodonts by the shape of their molars, which bore three main cusps of roughly equal size. During occlusion, the upper and lower molars interlocked tightly, producing a self-sharpening cutting edge. Historically, the triconodontids were thought to have a different occlusion pattern than other eutriconodonts, with the middle cusp of the lower molar (cusp a) fitting between the middle cusp (cusp A) and the front cusp (cusp B) of the upper molar, as in the basal mammaliaform Morganucodon. However, a 2020 study on Priacodon suggests that triconodontids occluded their molars in the same manner as other eutriconodonts (so-called "embrasure occlusion"), with the middle cusp (cusp A/a) fitting between two opposing molars.

== Taxonomy ==
Triconodontidae was named by Marsh (1887). It was assigned to Polyprotodontia by Cope (1889); to Triconodonta by Rasmussen and Callison (1981), Bonaparte (1986), Carroll (1988) and Engelmann and Callison (1998); and to Mammalia by Marsh (1887) and Luo et al. (2001).

Sometimes Volaticotheria is recovered as a part of this group. However, other phylogenetic studies group it outside of Triconodontidae.

== Phylogeny ==
Cladogram after Gaetano & Rougier, 2011:

- Triconodontidae
  - Priacodon
  - - Triconodon
    - - Trioracodon
      - Alticonodontinae
        - Arundelconodon
        - - - Meiconodon
            - - Astroconodon
              - - Alticonodon
                - Corviconodon
          - - Jugulator
            - Volaticotherini
              - Ichthyoconodon
              - - Argentoconodon
                - Volaticotherium
