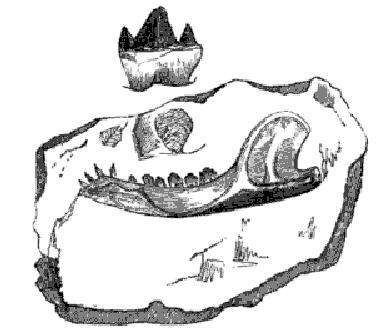
- Fossil jaw and teeth

Scientific classification
- Kingdom: Animalia
- Phylum: Chordata
- Class: Mammalia
- Order: †Eutriconodonta
- Family: †Amphilestidae
- Genus: †Phascolotherium; Owen, 1838

Type species
- †Didelphys bucklandi Broderip, 1828

Species
- †P. bucklandi (Broderip, 1828); †P. simpsoni Butler & Sigogneau-Russell, 2016

= Phascolotherium =

Phascolotherium Temporal range: Bathonian ~167–165 Ma

Extinct family of mammals

Phascolotherium is a genus of extinct eutriconodont mammal from the Middle Jurassic of the United Kingdom. Found in the Stonesfield Slate, it was one of the first Mesozoic mammals ever found and described, although like the other mammal jaws found at the same time, it was mistakenly thought at first to be a marsupial.

== Discovery ==
Phascolotherium was one of the first mammals described from Mesozoic-aged rocks. It is only known from single lower jaws and some isolated teeth.

Buckland showed the fossil jaws of Stonesfield to the exceptional comparative anatomist, Georges Cuvier, who incorrectly identified them as marsupials, based on the similarity of the bones to modern marsupials. Blainville also attributed the fossil to his newly erected genus, Amphitherium. More than one specimen was given to Buckland, and one of these lower jaws was lost, but found again in 1827 by William Broderip, and thought by Charles Lyell to be evidence that mammals dated from the earliest times without having changed.

However, British comparative anatomist Richard Owen later recognized the Stonesfield fossils as being distinct from opossums and from another mammal found in the same rocks, named Amphitherium. The new genus Phascolotherium was given to "D." bucklandi. A second species, P. simpsoni was named from specimens from the Kirtlington mammal bed and Watton Cliff, both of the Forest Marble Formation in 2016.

== Description ==
The body mass of P. simpsoni has been estimated to have been between 1.46 g and 9.00 g, close to the lower size limit of endotherm body mass.
