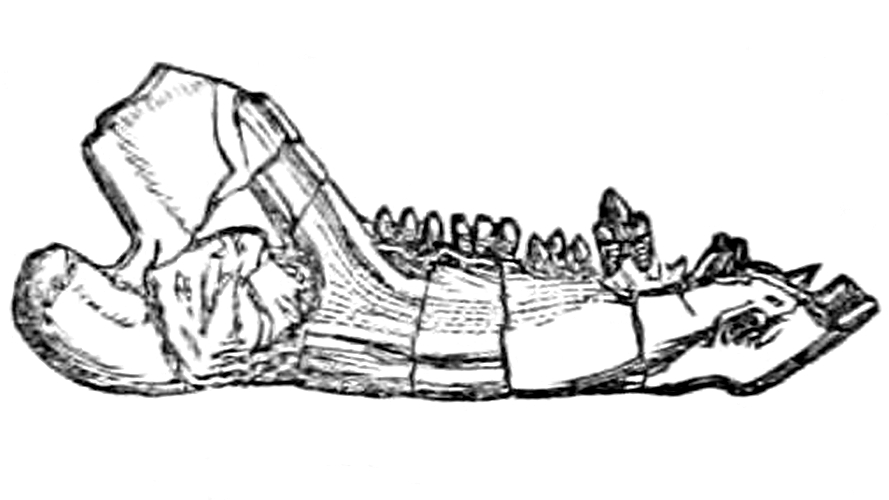
- Triconodon mordax jaw, Richard Owen 1861

Scientific classification
- Kingdom: Animalia
- Phylum: Chordata
- Class: Mammalia
- Order: †Eutriconodonta
- Family: †Triconodontidae
- Genus: †Triconodon; Owen, 1859

Type species
- †Triconodon mordax Owen, 1859

Other species
- †T. averianovi Jäger, Cifelli & Martin, 2020

Synonyms
- Triacanthodon Owen, 1871

= Triconodon =

Triconodon Temporal range: Berriasian ~145–140 Ma

Extinct family of mammals

Triconodon ("three-coned tooth") is a genus of extinct mammal from the Early Cretaceous of England and France with two known species: T. mordax and T. averianovi. First described in 1859 by Richard Owen, it is the type genus for the order Triconodonta, a group of mammals characterised by their three-cusped (triconodont) molar teeth. Since then, this "simplistic" type of dentition has been understood to be either ancestral for mammals or else to have evolved multiple times, rendering "triconodonts" a paraphyletic or polyphyletic assemblage respectively, but several lineages of "triconodont" mammals do form a natural, monophyletic group, known as Eutriconodonta, of which Triconodon is indeed part of.

Triconodon, therefore, is significant in the understanding of the evolution of mammals by originating the understanding of the "triconodont" grade and eutriconodont clade. Further discoveries on its skeletal anatomy also offer further insights on the palaeobiology of Mesozoic mammals.

== Discovery ==
The type specimen of Triconodon is BMNH 47764, a single mandible found in the Purbeck Group, England, pertaining to the type species (T. mordax). Since then, several other specimens have been found in this region, mostly represented by skulls and jaws, making it the most common mammal fossils in this area of Britain. These deposits date to the earliest Cretaceous, to the Berriasian at around 145-140 million years of age. The second species, T. averianovi, was named in 2020 based on fossils found in the Berriasian-aged Lulworth Formation, England.

A single specimen has also been found in the Champblanc Quarry in France, dating to roughly the same age. It is unclear if it belongs to the same species as the British form, though given the close temporal and geographical proximity it seems likely.

== Classification ==
Triconodon is known from two species, represented only by T. averianovi and T. mordax (though see above). Besides being the type genus and species for Eutriconodonta as seen above, it is also the type genus and species for Triconodontidae, erected in 1887 by Charles Marsh. Within this group it is usually recovered in a basal position, sometimes as sister taxa to Trioracodon, or closer to the group containing the rest of the clade, rendering Trioracodon in the basalmost position.

== Biology ==
Like most eutriconodonts, Triconodon was probably a carnivore, its triconodont teeth being well adapted for shearing, and possessing other speciations such as long canines and powerful jaw musculature. It was about as large as a modern cat, suggesting that it hunted vertebrate prey such as other mammals or small dinosaurs. A study detailing Mesozoic mammal diets ranks it among carnivorous taxa.

=== Tooth replacement ===
Triconodon is one of the few Mesozoic mammals with direct evidence of tooth eruption, thanks to a broad ontogenetic range presented by the specimens. Through several juvenile specimens we can document the replacement of its lower fourth premolar, erupting and coming into use when at least three out of its four molars were already fully erupted.

=== Brain ===
One of the earliest fossil brain endocast studies has been performed for Triconodon. The olfactory lobe is large, with a teardrop-shaped outline, suggesting a well developed sense of smell.

The cerebral hemisphere is long, oval and flat, lacking the inflated appearance present in monotremes, multituberculates and therians. The cerebrum is neither expanded anteriorly to overlap the posterior part of the olfactory lobe, nor is it hemispherical. It is similar to that of multituberculates in that it has a large, roughly triangular bulge, now thought to be the superior cistern. The midbrain was apparently exposed to the dorsal side of the brain as with many other non-therian mammals.

What this indicates about the animal's intelligence is currently unclear, though its overall brain proportions are somewhat smaller than those of more derived mammals like multituberculates and therians.

Triconodon EQ — 0.28, which is close to that of an opossum (0.284).
