= Amphilestes =

Amphilestes Temporal range: Bathonian ~168–166 Ma

Scientific classification
- Kingdom: Animalia
- Phylum: Chordata
- Class: Mammalia
- Order: †Eutriconodonta
- Family: †Amphilestidae
- Genus: †Amphilestes; Owen, 1859
- Species: †A. broderipii

Binomial name
- †Amphilestes broderipii (Owen, 1845)

Synonyms
- Amphitherium broderipii Owen, 1845

Extinct family of mammals

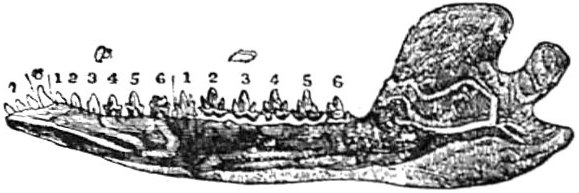
Lower jaw and teeth of Amphilestes broderipi

Amphilestes is a genus of extinct eutriconodont mammal from the Middle Jurassic of the United Kingdom. It was one of the first Mesozoic mammals discovered and described.

== Discovery ==
The first specimen of Amphilestes was discovered along with several other mammal jaws in the Stonesfield Slate Quarry, Oxfordshire before 1764. However, it was not until 1812 that William Broderip bought the jaws, and he and his mentor - the famous palaeontologist Revd William Buckland - recognised that they were of mammal origin. Amphilestes broderipii was originally Amphitherium broderipii, until it was recognised as a distinct and new species in 1871.

== Description ==
Amphilestes is known from various dental and mandibular remains. The dental formula of the mandible is 4:1:4:5. The premolars are symmetrical and the crowns look like tricusped molars, with the central cusp being largest in premolars and molars, though the size difference is less great in the premolars. George Gaylord Simpson (1928, p. 71) noted that the teeth of Amphilestes are diagnosable in having “molar cusps high and slender, molar cingulum rising below the main cusp, molar enamel not pitted."
