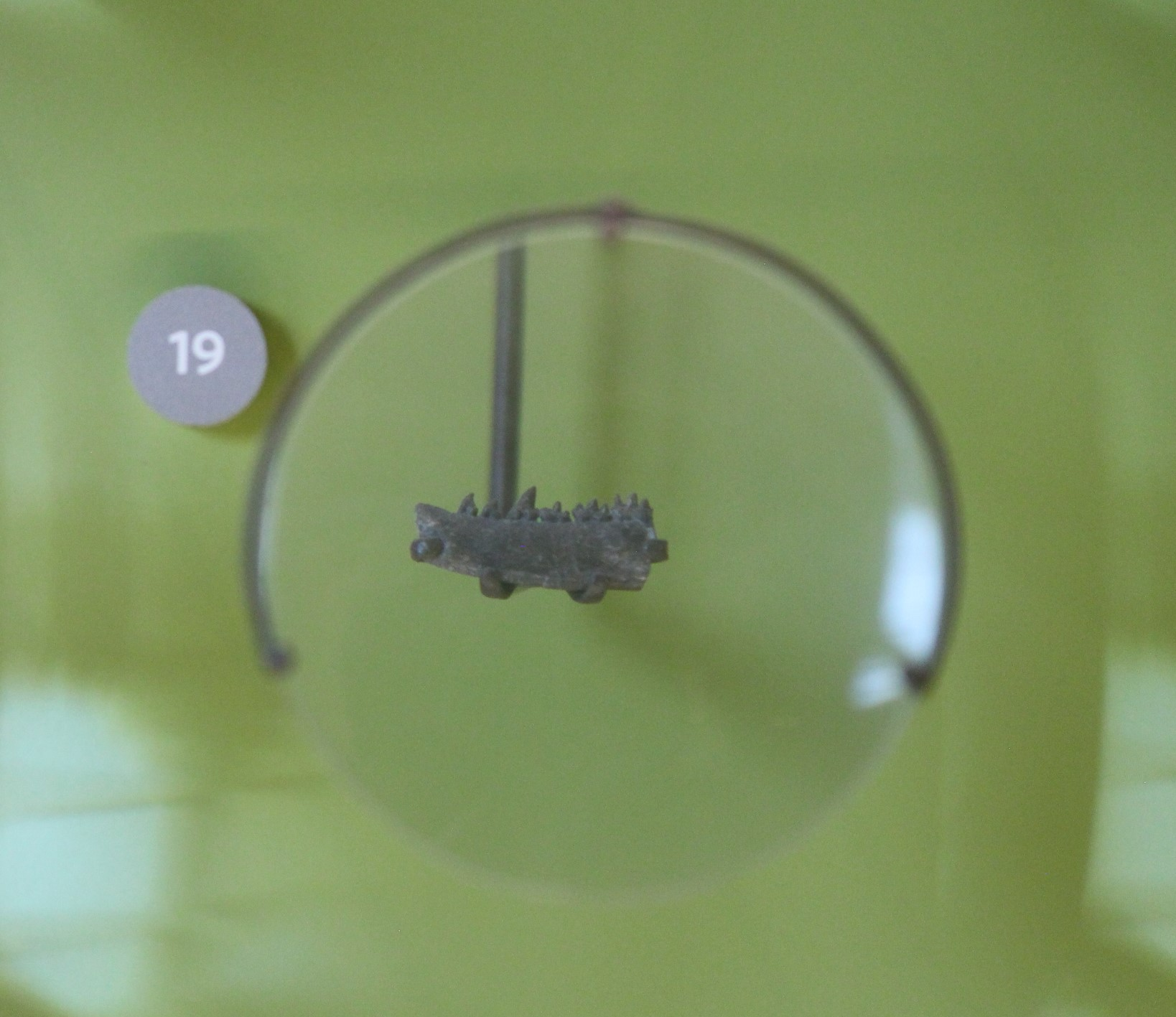
- Lower jaw (LACM 135530) of P. fruitaensis, Natural History Museum of Los Angeles County

Scientific classification
- Domain: Eukaryota
- Kingdom: Animalia
- Phylum: Chordata
- Class: Mammalia
- Order: †Eutriconodonta
- Family: †Triconodontidae
- Genus: †Priacodon; Marsh, 1887

Type species
- †Priacodon ferox Marsh, 1880

= Priacodon =

Priacodon Temporal range: Late Jurassic

Extinct family of mammals

Priacodon is an extinct genus of Late Jurassic eutriconodont mammal from the Alcobaça Formation of Portugal and the Morrison Formation of the midwestern United States. It is present in stratigraphic zones 4–6 of the latter. The genus contains four known species: Priacodon ferox, Priacodon fruitaensis, Priacodon lulli and Priacodon robustus.

== Jaw and teeth ==
A study on the jaw and teeth of Priacodon suggests that eutriconodonts, while specialised towards carnivory, had a more passive jaw roll than modern therian carnivores. It also demonstrates that embrasure occlusion was present in all eutriconodonts, as opposed to one-to-one patterns as previously assumed for the family Triconodontidae.

== See also ==
- Paleobiota of the Morrison Formation
