= Trioracodon =

Trioracodon Temporal range: Tithonian-Berriasian ~146–140 Ma

Scientific classification
- Kingdom: Animalia
- Phylum: Chordata
- Class: Mammalia
- Order: †Eutriconodonta
- Family: †Triconodontidae
- Genus: †Trioracodon; Simpson, 1928

Species
- T. bisulcus; T. ferox (= Triconodon ferox Owen 1871, the type); T. major; T. oweni

Extinct family of mammals

Trioracodon is an extinct genus of Late Jurassic to Early Cretaceous eutriconodont mammal found in North America and the British Isles. It was named in 1928.

T. bisulcus is known from the Morrison Formation, where it is present in stratigraphic zone 5, and three other species from the Purbeck Group in Dorset.

== See also ==
- List of prehistoric mammals
- Paleobiota of the Morrison Formation
