= Alticonodon =

Alticonodon Temporal range: Santonian-Campanian, 84.5–83.5 Ma

Scientific classification
- Kingdom: Animalia
- Phylum: Chordata
- Class: Mammalia
- Order: †Eutriconodonta
- Family: †Triconodontidae
- Subfamily: †Alticonodontinae
- Genus: †Alticonodon; Fox, 1969
- Species: †A. lindoei

Binomial name
- †Alticonodon lindoei Fox, 1969

Extinct family of mammals

Alticonodon is a genus of extinct mammal from the Late Cretaceous of North America. It is one of the geologically youngest known eutriconodonts, and is a fairly more specialised animal than earlier representatives of this clade.

== Description ==
Alticonodon is currently a monotypic genus, represented exclusively by A. lindoei. It is known from the Milk River Formation deposits of the early Campanian of Alberta, Canada. It is known from two specimens: a dentary fragment bearing two molars, and an isolated lower last molar.

== Classification ==
Alticonodon was named by Richard C. Fox in 1969 in the Upper Milk River Formation. It is only known from dentary fragments and the rest of the skeleton has not been found yet.

Its name is derived from the Latin word "altus" (meaning "high"), and the suffix "conodon". Therefore, giving it the name Alticonodon.

Alticonodon has been consistently recovered as a triconodontid, and more specifically as an alticonodontine, though the latter term may be redundant in relation to the rest of Triconodontidae.

== Biology ==
Compared to earlier eutriconodonts, Alticonodon has molars better specialised for shearing. As eutriconodonts as a group had shearing molars due to their carnivorous habits, it can be inferred that Alticonodon was hypercarnivorous.

This ecological specialisation might have come due to competition with other mammals in the region, such as the various metatherians.

== Ecology ==
The Milk River Formation is a rich fossil environment that covered near-shore and terrestrial deposits. It included a few dinosaur species like Saurornitholestes and Acrotholus, as well as a variety of other vertebrate such as the crocodilian Gilchristosuchus, various turtles and fish.

The mammalian fauna was primarily dominated by metatherians and multituberculates, as usual for Late Cretaceous mammaliafaunas, but a variety of older taxa remained; besides Alticonodon, there was also the symmetrodont Symmetrodontoides, and Potamotelses and picopsids. These were the last non-therian mammals (other than the highly successful multituberculates) in North America, suggesting a relictual element to the region's fauna.
