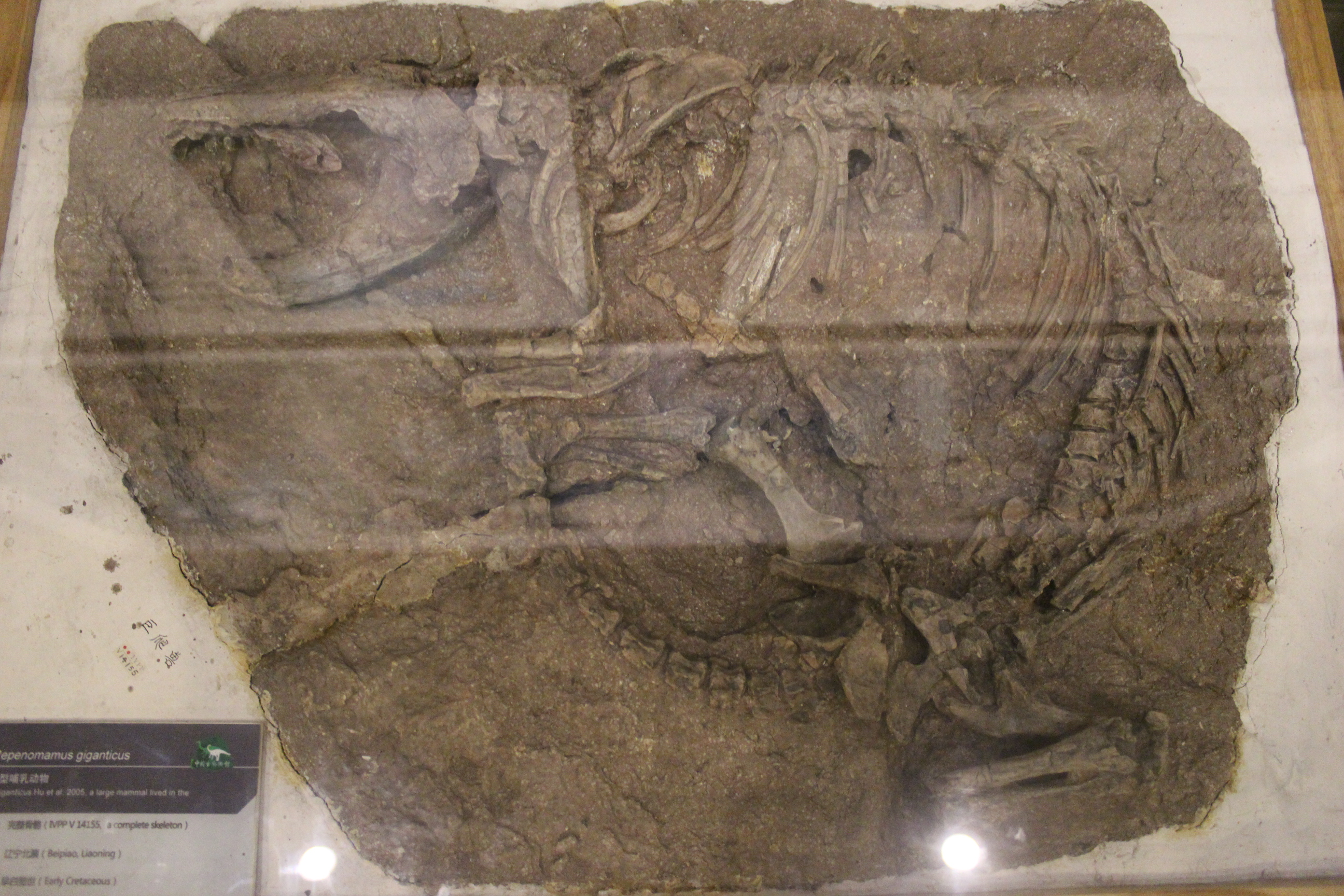
- Type of R. giganticus, Paleozoological Museum of China

Scientific classification
- Kingdom: Animalia
- Phylum: Chordata
- Class: Mammalia
- Order: †Eutriconodonta (?)
- Family: †Gobiconodontidae
- Genus: †Repenomamus; Li et al., 2001

Type species
- †Repenomamus robustus Li et al., 2001

Species
- †Repenomamus robustus Li et al., 2000 †Repenomamus giganticus Hu et al., 2005

= Repenomamus =

Repenomamus Temporal range: Early Cretaceous, 125–123.2 Ma

Extinct genus of mammals

Repenomamus (Latin: "reptile" (reptilis), "mammal" (mammalis)) is a genus of opossum- to badger-sized gobiconodontid mammal containing two species, Repenomamus robustus and Repenomamus giganticus. Both species are known from fossils found in China that date to the early Cretaceous period, about 125-123.2 million years ago. R. robustus is one of several Mesozoic mammals (Note: Other eutriconodonts and deltatheroidean metatherians have adaptations towards specialised carnivory) for which there is good evidence that it fed on vertebrates, including dinosaurs. Though it is not entirely clear whether these animals primarily hunted live dinosaurs or scavenged dead ones, evidence for the former is present in fossilized remains showcasing the results of what was most likely a predation attempt by R. robustus directed at a specimen of the dinosaur Psittacosaurus lujiatunensis. R. giganticus is among the largest mammals known from the Mesozoic era, only surpassed by Patagomaia.

== Classification and discovery ==
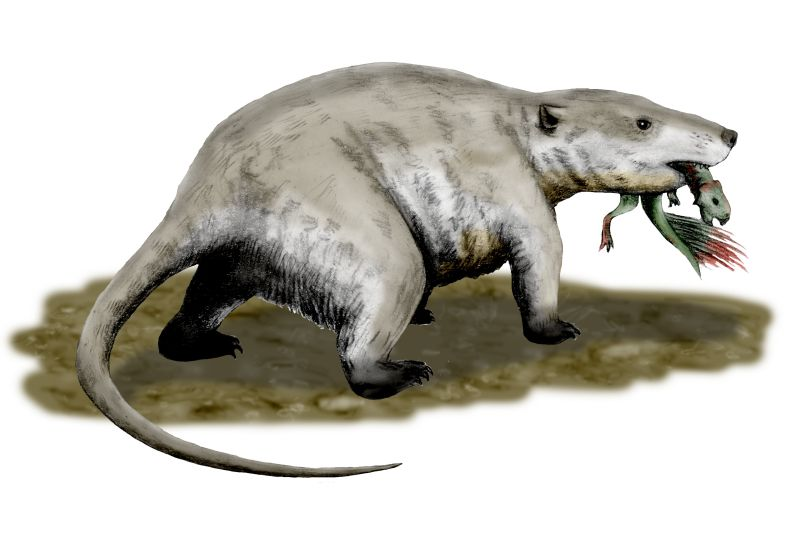
An R. robustus feeding on a Psittacosaurus hatchling.

The fossils were recovered from the lagerstätte of the Yixian Formation in the Liaoning province of China, which is renowned for its extraordinarily well-preserved fossils of feathered dinosaurs. They have been specifically dated to 125–123.2 million years ago, during the Early Cretaceous period.

Repenomamus is a genus of eutriconodonts, a group of early mammals with no modern relatives. R. robustus was described by Li, Wang, Wang and Li in 2001, and R. giganticus was described by Hu, Meng, Wang and Li in 2005. The two known species are the sole members of the family Repenomamidae, which was also described in the same paper in 2001. It is sometimes alternatively listed as a member of the family Gobiconodontidae; although this assignment is controversial, a close relationship to this family is well-founded.

== Description ==
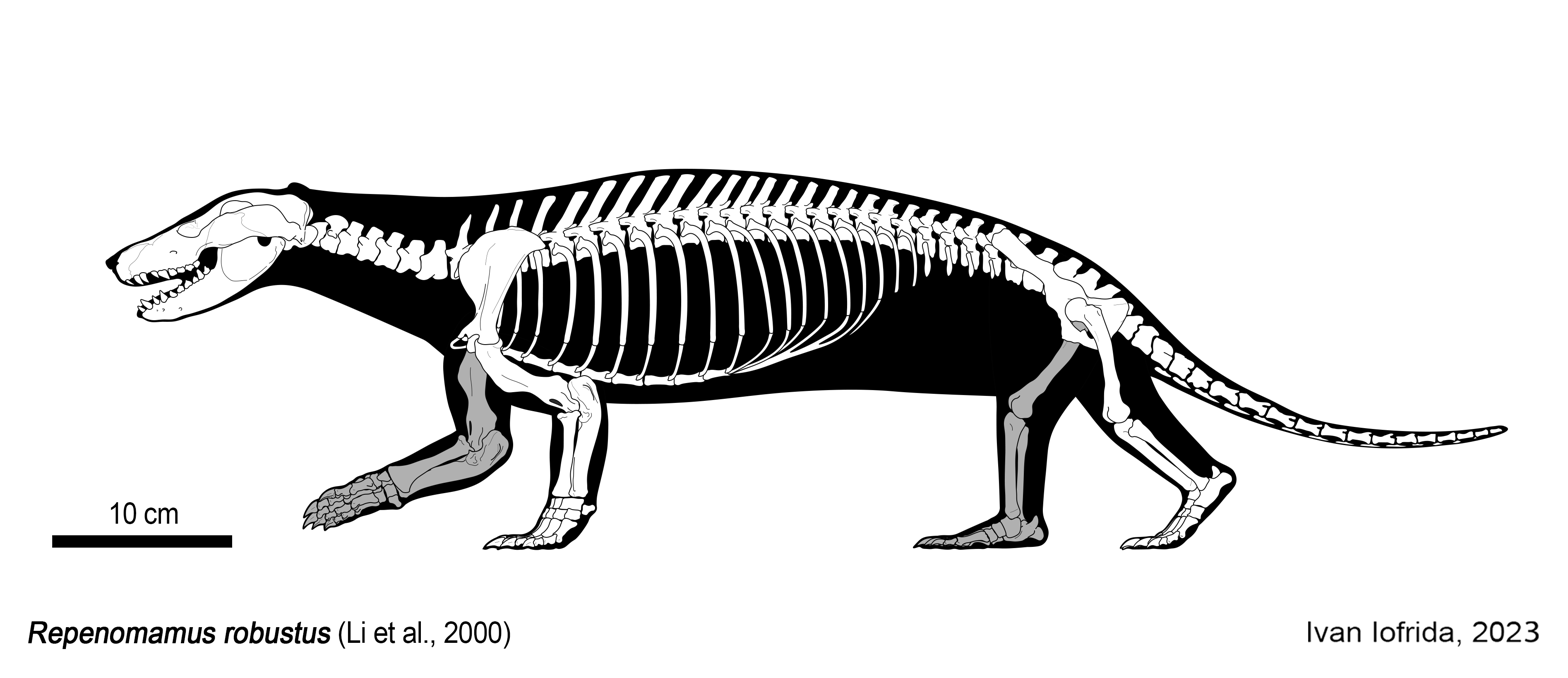
R. robustus skeletal diagram.

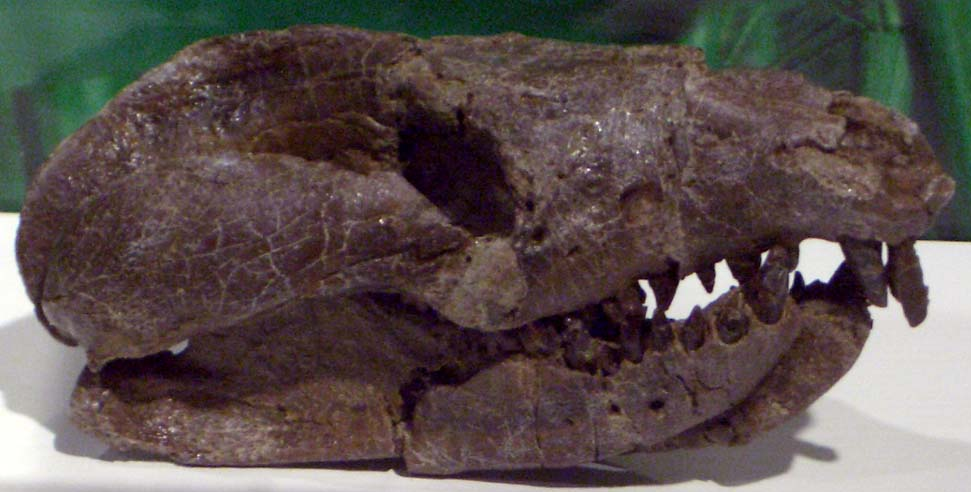
Fossil skull of R. giganticus

Individuals of the known species in Repenomamus are some of the largest known Mesozoic mammals represented by reasonably complete fossils (though Kollikodon and Patagomaia may be larger, and Schowalteria, Oxlestes, Khuduklestes and Bubodens reached similar if not larger sizes). Adults of R. robustus were the size of a Virginia opossum. It had body length without tail of 41.2 cm (16 in) for complete specimen with estimated skull length of 10.6 cm (4.2 in), although there is more partial specimen that had 11.2 cm (4.4 in) skull. Estimated mass of R. robustus is 4–6 kg (8.8–13 lb).

The known adult of R. giganticus was about 50% larger than R. robustus, with a body length of 68.2 cm (27 in) and total length over 1 m (3 ft 3 in) (skull reaching 16 cm (6.3 in), trunk of 52.2 cm (21 in) and preserved tail 36.4 cm (14 in) in length) and an estimated mass of 12–14 kg (26–31 lb). These finds extend considerably the known body size range of Mesozoic mammals. In fact, Repenomamus was larger than several small sympatric dromaeosaurid dinosaurs like Graciliraptor. Features of its shoulder and legs bones indicate a sprawling posture as in most of small to medium sized living therian mammals, with plantigrade feet. Unlike therian mammals, Repenomamus had a proportionally longer body with shorter limbs.

The dental formula was originally interpreted as 3.1.2.42.1.2.5, though a more recent study indicates instead that it was 3.1.1.52.1.2.5.

== Paleobiology ==
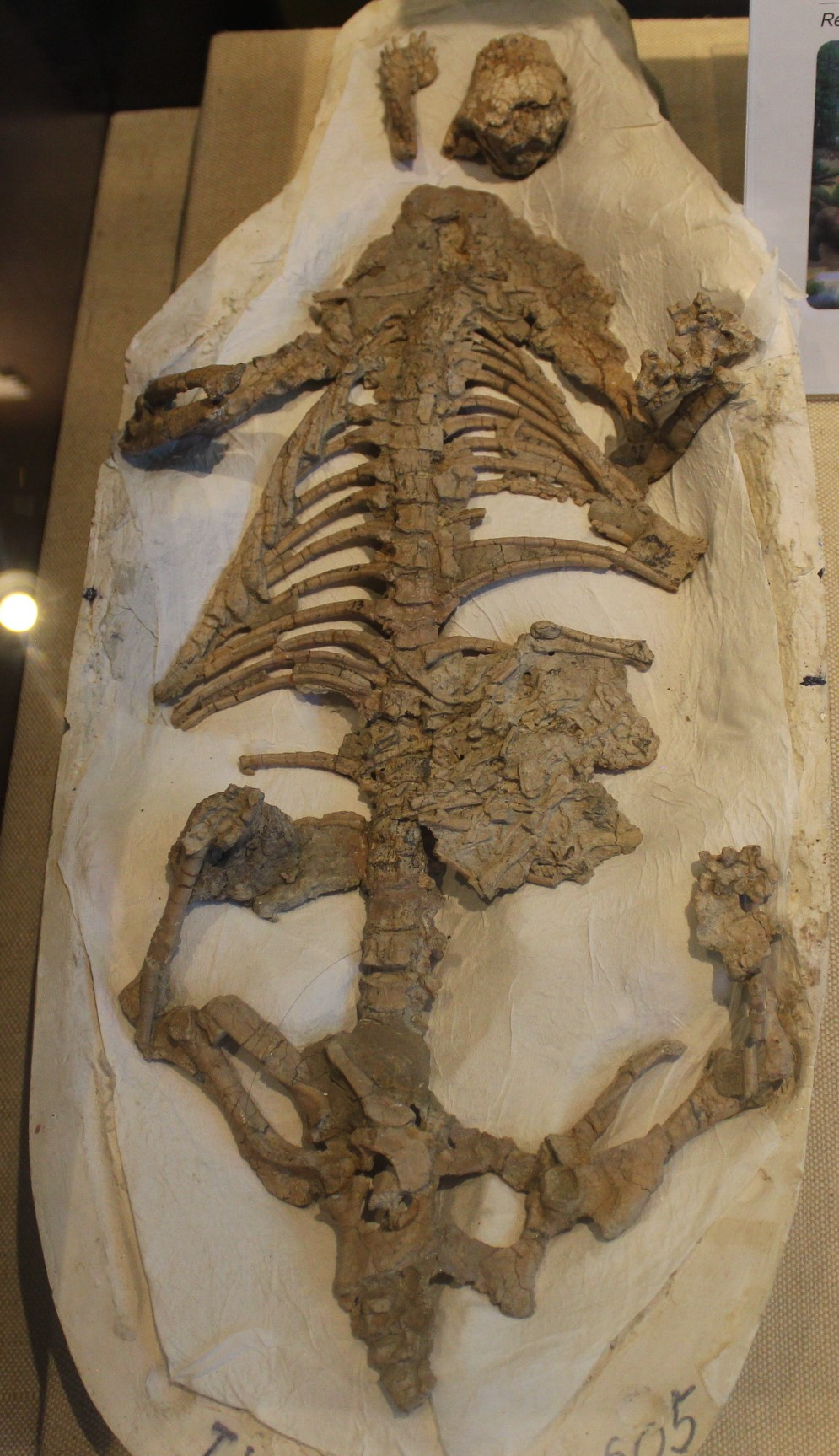
R. robustus specimen with Psittacosaurus remains in its stomach, Paleozoological Museum of China.

Features of the teeth and jaw suggest that Repenomamus were carnivorous and a specimen of R. robustus discovered with the fragmentary skeleton of a juvenile Psittacosaurus preserved in its stomach represents the second direct evidence that at least some Mesozoic mammals were carnivorous and fed on other vertebrates, including dinosaurs; a recorded attack on an Archaeornithoides by a Deltatheridium predates its description.

More evidence suggesting Repenomamus was suited to a predatory lifestyle was later revealed when a specimen of R. robustus was uncovered alongside an adult Psittacosaurus. The intertwined nature of the fossil, similar to the Fighting Dinosaurs fossil of Mongolia, was likely a byproduct of an altercation between the two animals in which the mammal was most likely the instigator of an ongoing predation attempt. This was posited on the basis that the Repenomamus involved was noted to have been latching on to the Psittacosaurus with its arms and legs while biting the dinosaur. Speciations towards carnivory are known in eutriconodonts as a whole, and similarly large sized species like Gobiconodon, Jugulator and even Triconodon itself are thought to have tackled proportionally large prey as well; evidence of scavenging is even assigned to the former.

Like most other non-placental mammals, Repenomamus had epipubic bones, implying that it gave birth to undeveloped young like modern marsupials, or laid eggs like modern monotremes.

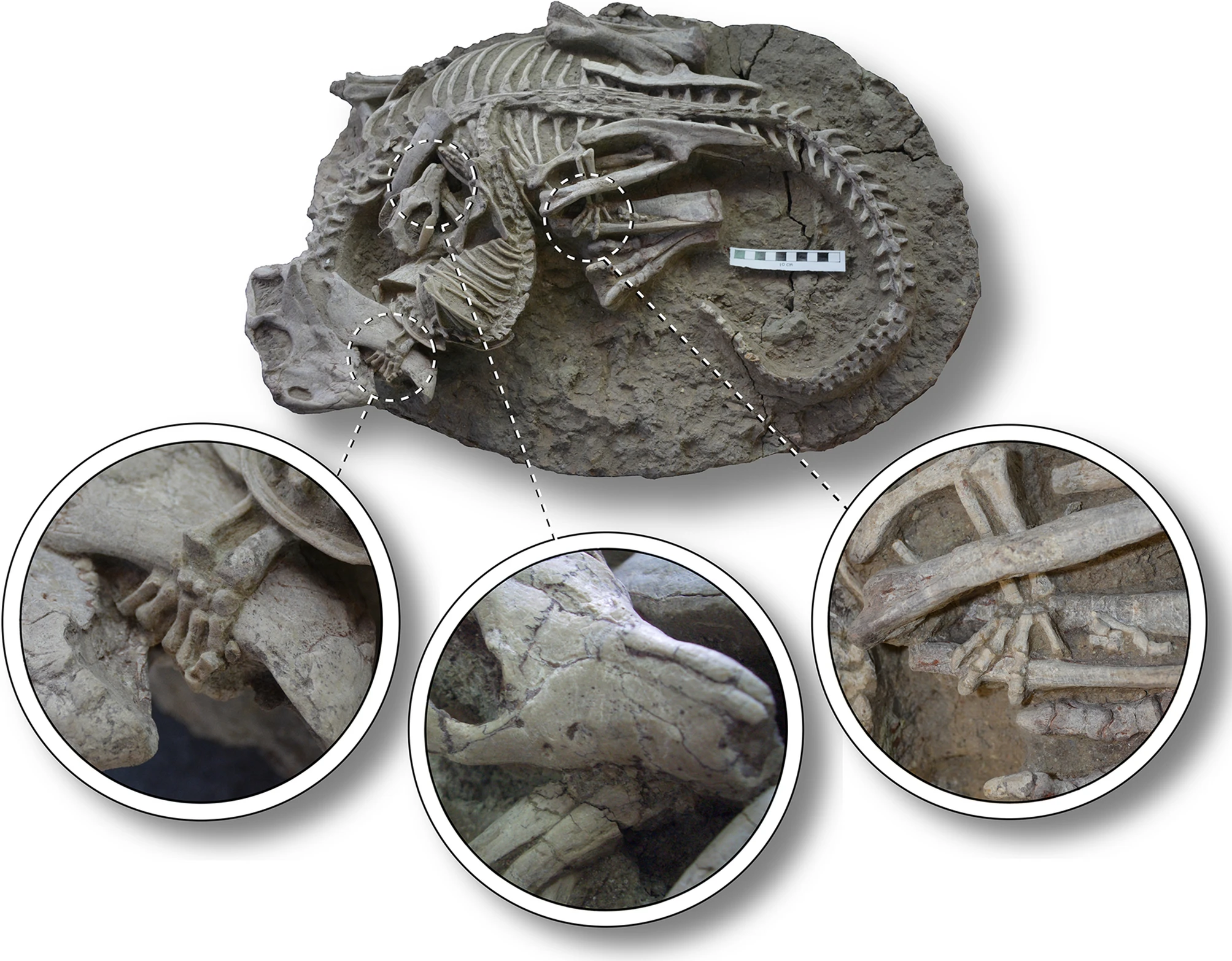
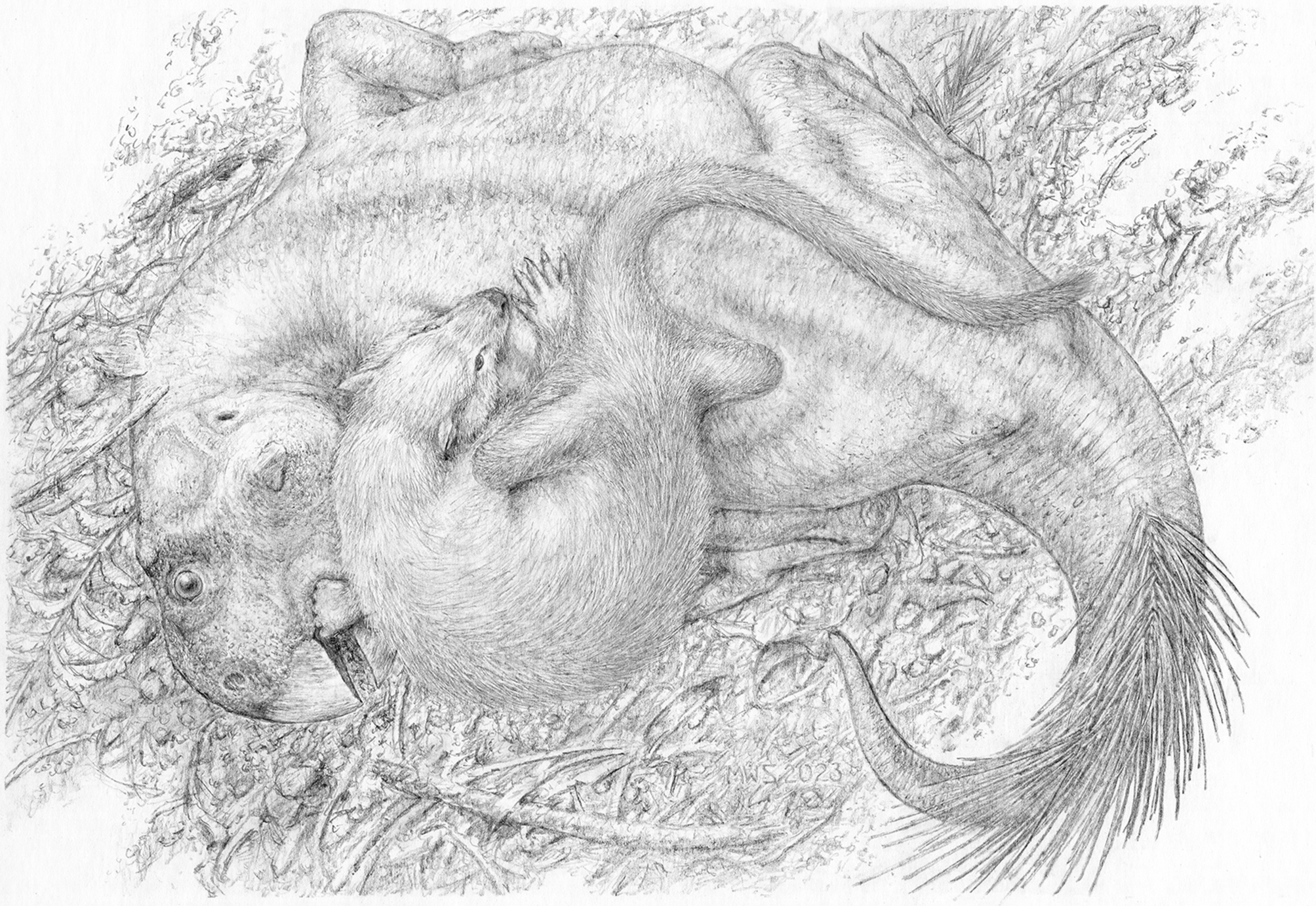
R. robustus, locked in combat with Psittacosaurus lujiatunensis.

== See also ==
- Mammaliaformes
- Cynodonts
- Cynognathus
- Evolution of mammals
