= List of the Mesozoic life of Maryland =

This list of the Mesozoic life of Maryland contains the various prehistoric life-forms whose fossilized remains have been reported from within the US state of Maryland and are between 252.17 and 66 million years of age.

== A ==
- Acirsa
  - †Acirsa americana – or unidentified related form
  - †Acirsa clathrata
  - †Acirsa flexicostata
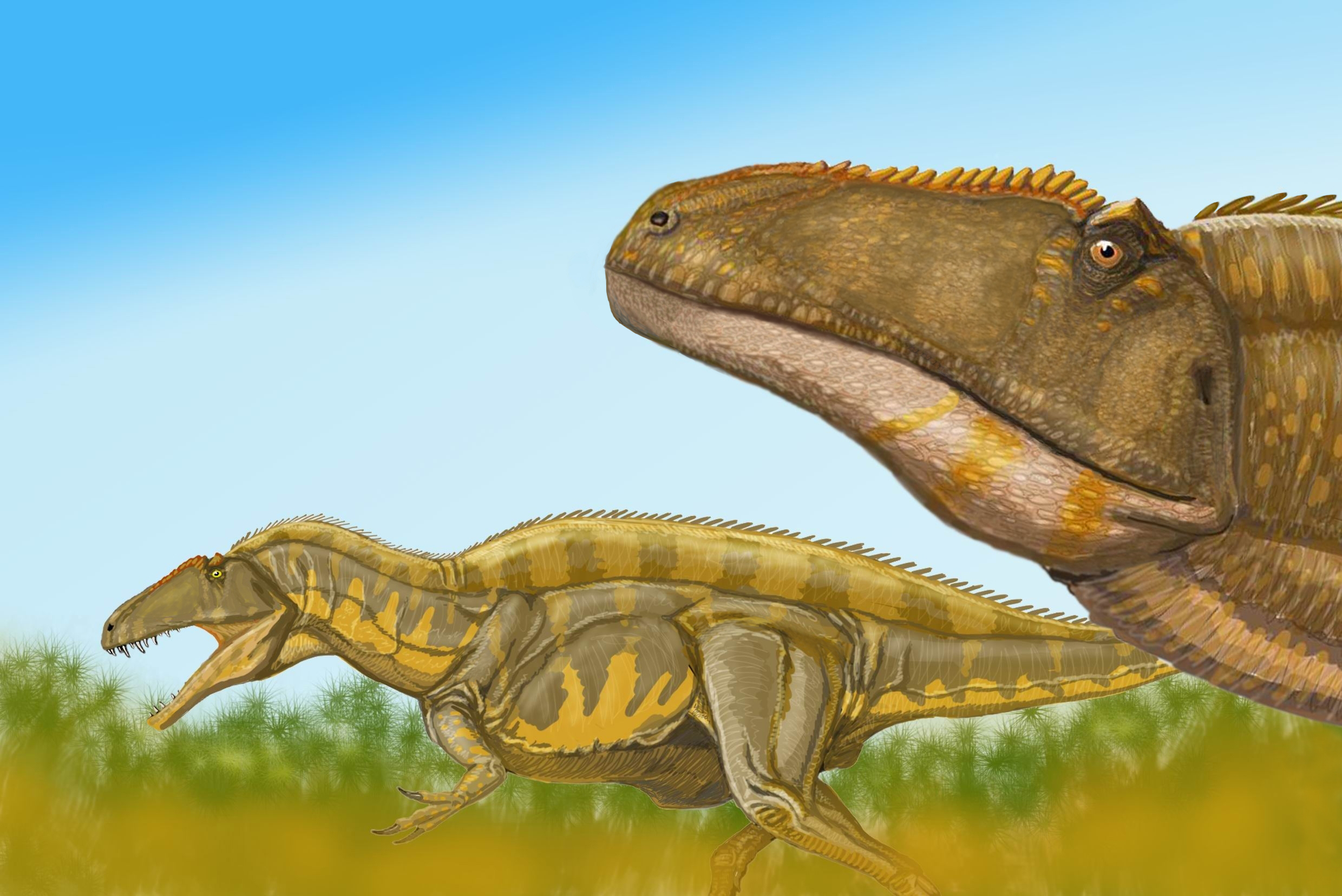
- Life restoration of the Early Cretaceous theropod dinosaur Acrocanthosaurus
  †Acrocanthosaurus – or unidentified comparable form
- †Acteon
  - †Acteon cicatricosus
- †Acutostrea
  - †Acutostrea plumosa
- †Aenona
  - †Aenona eufaulensis
  - †Aenona georgiana
- †Agerostrea
  - †Agerostrea mesenterica
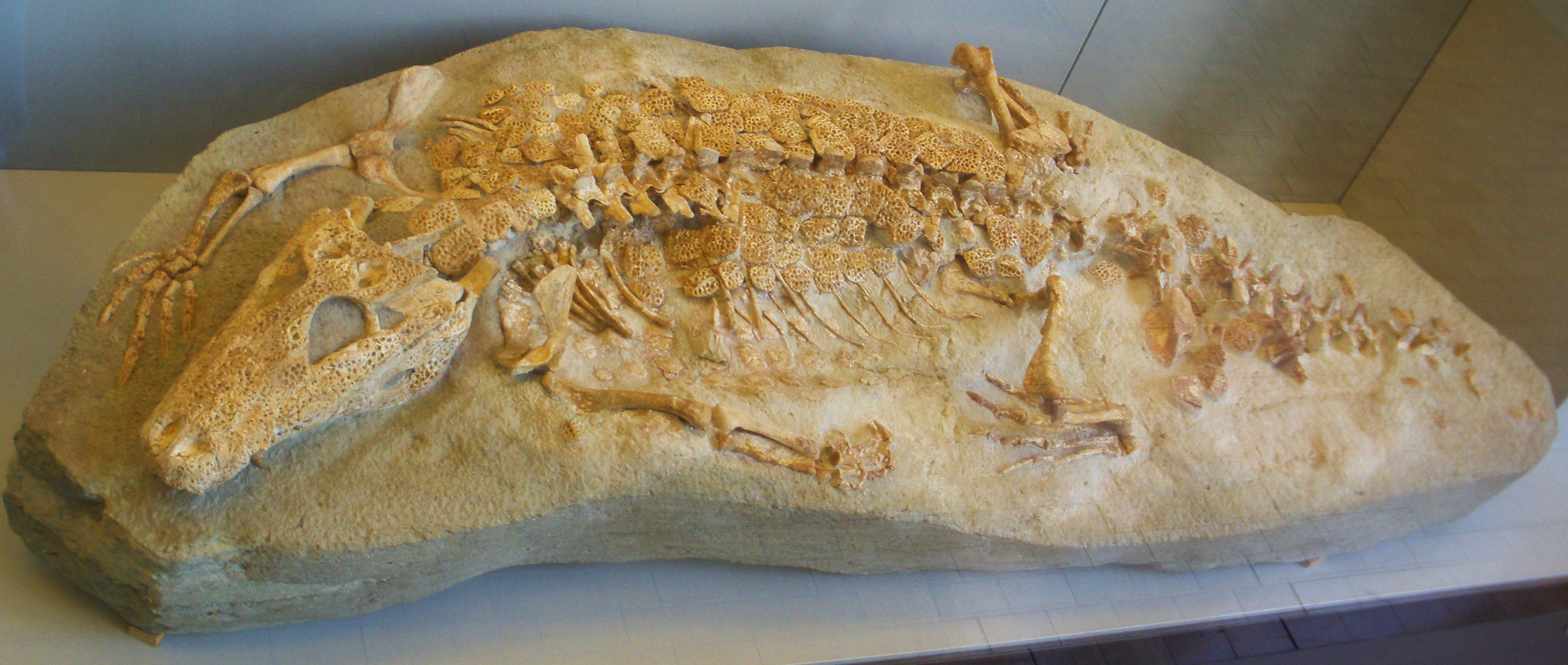
- Fossilized skeleton of the Late Cretaceous-Oligocene Alligator relative Allognathosuchus
  †Allognathosuchus – or unidentified comparable form
- †Allosaurus
  - †Allosaurus medius – type locality for species
- †Ambigostrea
  - †Ambigostrea tecticosta
- Amuletum
  - †Amuletum dumasensis
  - †Amuletum fasciolatum – or unidentified comparable form
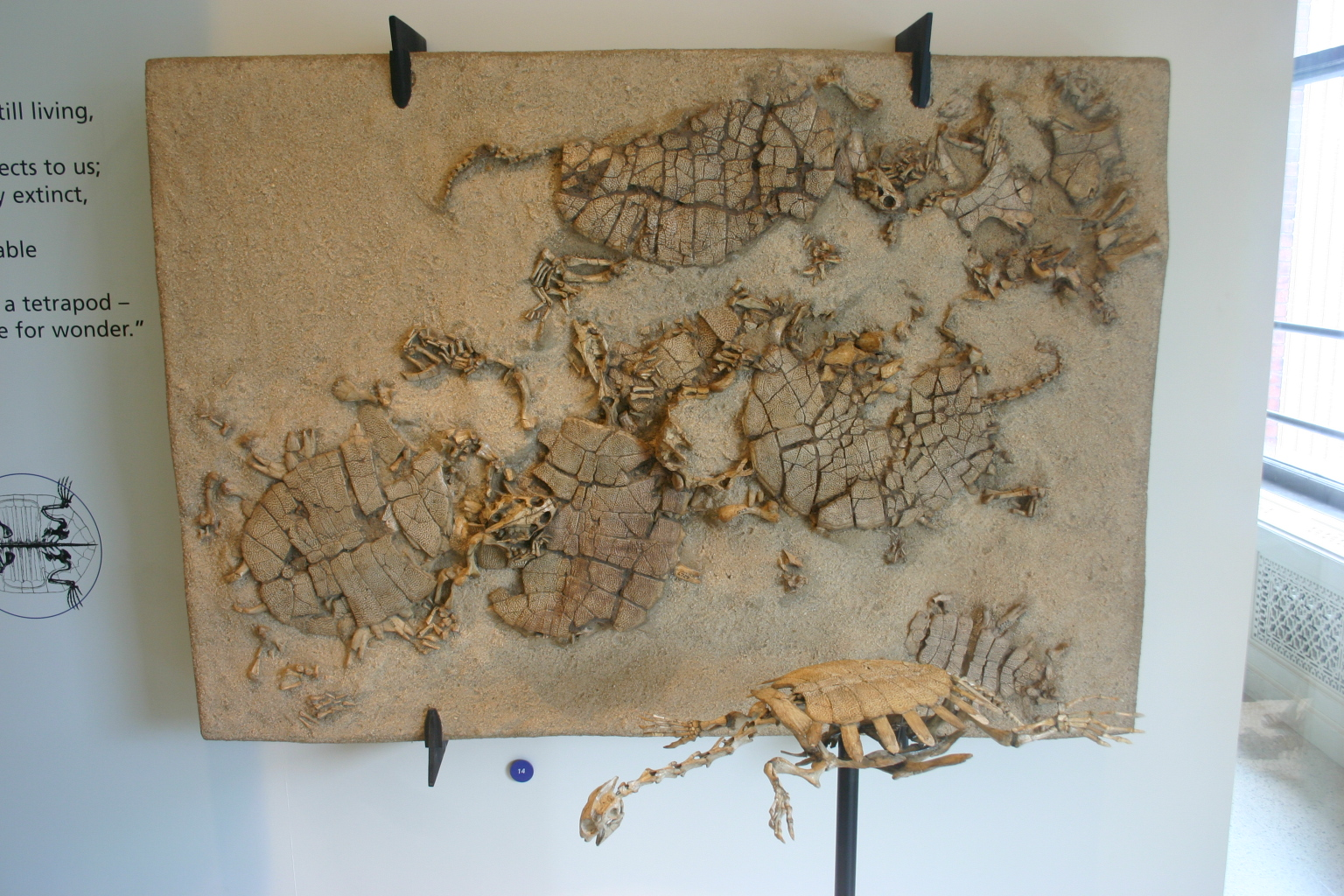
- Assemblage of fossilized skeletons of the softshell turtle Amyda
  †Amyda
  - †Amyda prisca
- †Anatimya
  - †Anatimya anteradiata
- †Ancilla
  - †Ancilla acutula
- †Anomalofusus
  - †Anomalofusus lemniscatus
- †Anomia
  - †Anomia argentaria
  - †Anomia ornata
- †Anomoeodus
  - †Anomoeodus latidens
  - †Anomoeodus phaseolus
- †Anteglossia
- †Aphrodina
  - †Aphrodina tippana
- †Araloselachus
  - †Araloselachus cuspidata
- †Arctostrea
  - †Arctostrea falacata
- †Argillomys – type locality for genus
  - †Argillomys marylandensis – type locality for species
- †Ariadnaesporites
  - †Ariadnaesporites intermedius – type locality for species
- Arrhoges
- †Arundelconodon – type locality for genus
  - †Arundelconodon hottoni – type locality for species
- †Arundelemys – type locality for genus
  - †Arundelemys dardeni – type locality for species
- Astarte
  - †Astarte culebrensis
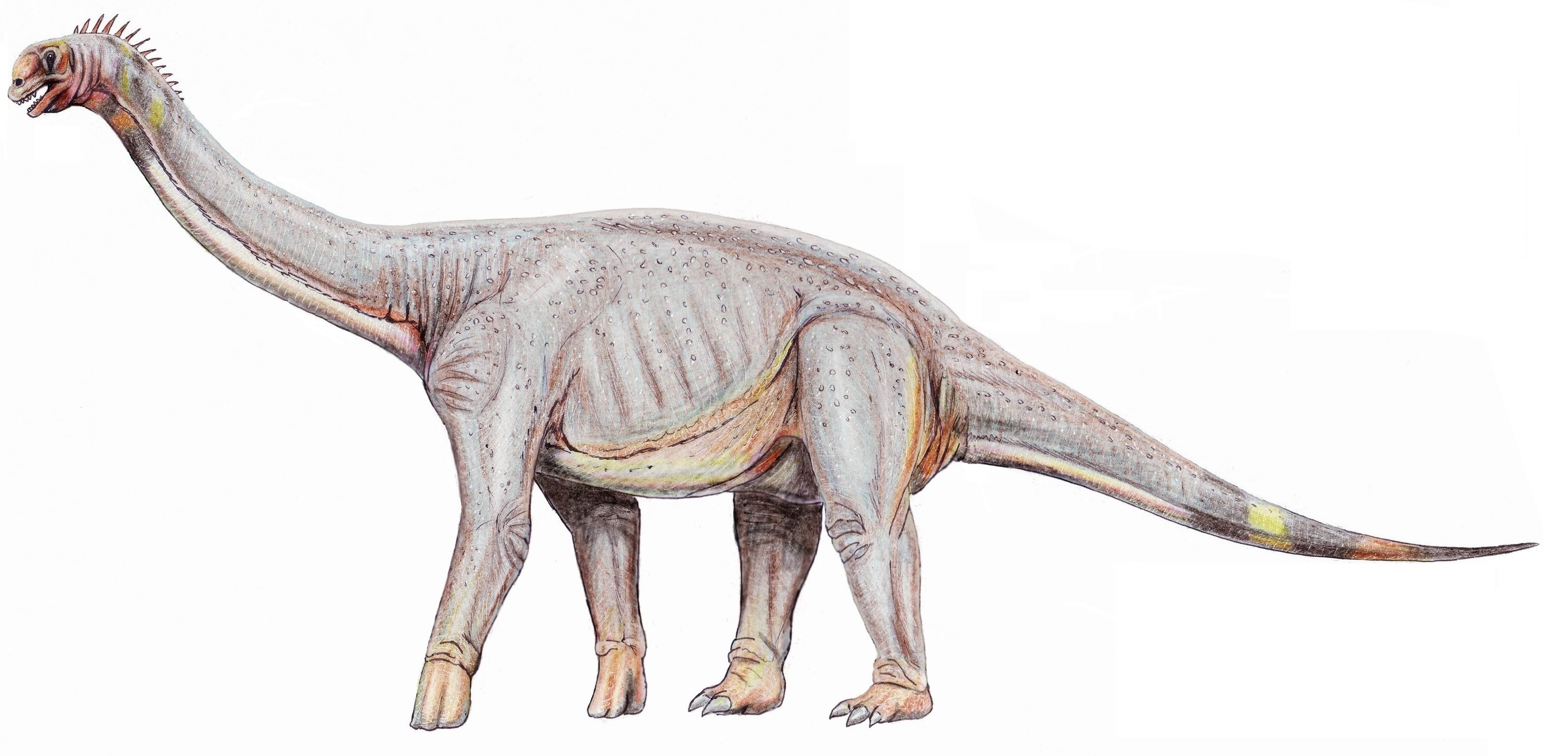
- Life restoration of the Early Cretaceous sauropod dinosaur Astrodon
  †Astrodon
  - †Astrodon johnstoni – type locality for species

== B ==
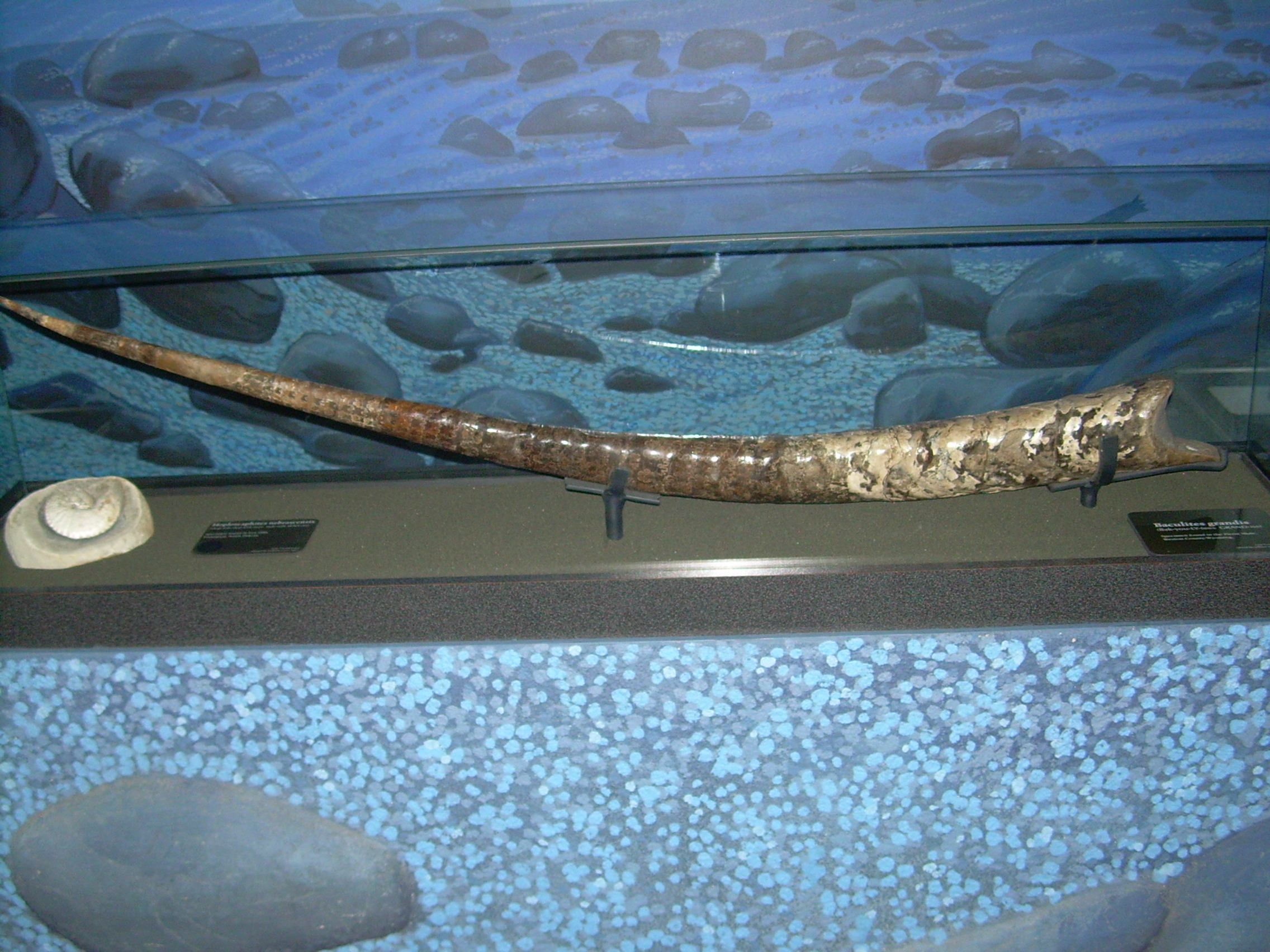
- Fossilized shell of the Late Cretaceous ammonoid cephalopod Baculites
  †Baculites
  - †Baculites baculus
  - †Baculites elisasi
  - †Baculites vertebralis
- †Bathytormus
  - †Bathytormus pteropsis
- †Bellifusus
  - †Bellifusus curvicostatus
- †Belliscala
- †Beretra
  - †Beretra gracilis – or unidentified comparable form
  - †Beretra ripleyana
  - †Beretra speciosa
- †Bottosaurus
  - †Bottosaurus harlani
- Botula
  - †Botula conchafodentis
  - †Botula lingua
  - †Botula ripleyana
- †Buccinopsis
  - †Buccinopsis crassicostata

== C ==
- Cadulus
  - †Cadulus obnutus
- Caestocorbula
  - †Caestocorbula crassaplica
  - †Caestocorbula crassiplica
  - †Caestocorbula percompressa
  - †Caestocorbula terramaria
- †Camptonectes
  - †Camptonectes bubonis
- Carcharias
  - †Carcharias holmdelensis
  - †Carcharias samhammeri
- †Cardiaster
  - †Cardiaster marylandicus
- Cardium
- †Caveola
  - †Caveola acuta
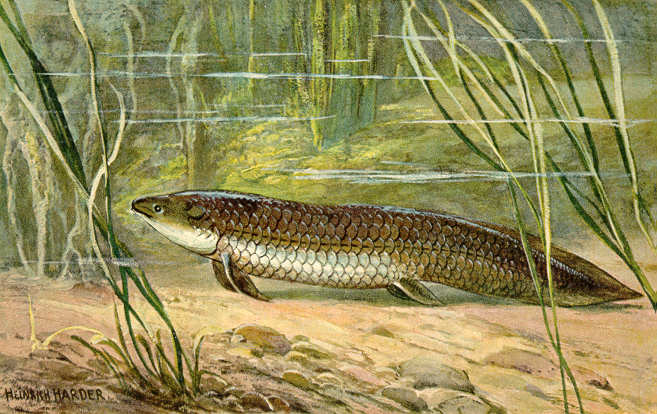
- Life restoration of the Late Triassic-Eocene lungfish Ceratodus
  †Ceratodus
  - †Ceratodus kranzi – type locality for species
- Cerithium
  - †Cerithium weeksi – or unidentified related form
- Chiloscyllium
  - †Chiloscyllium greeni
- †Cimoliasaurus
  - †Cimoliasaurus magnus
- †Clavatipollenites
- †Clavipholas
  - †Clavipholas pectorosa
  - †Clavipholas pectrosa
- †Coelosaurus
  - †Coelosaurus affinis
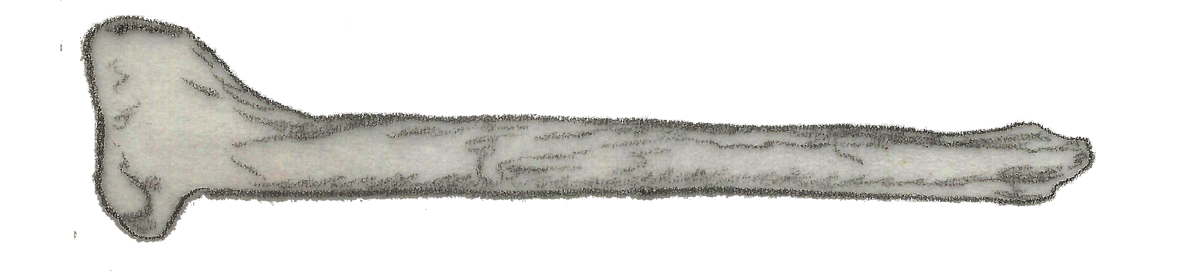
  - Illustration of a fossilized tibia of the Late Cretaceous theropod dinosaur Coelosaurus antiquus
    †Coelosaurus antiquus
- †Coelurus
  - †Coelurus gracilis – type locality for species
- †Corax
  - †Corax pristiodontus
- Corbula
  - †Corbula subradiata
- †Corymya – or unidentified comparable form
  - †Corymya tennis
- †Couperites
  - †Couperites mauldinensis
- Crassatella
  - †Crassatella vadosa
- †Crenella
  - †Crenella elegantula
  - †Crenella serica
- †Creonella
  - †Creonella subangulata – or unidentified comparable form
  - †Creonella triplicata
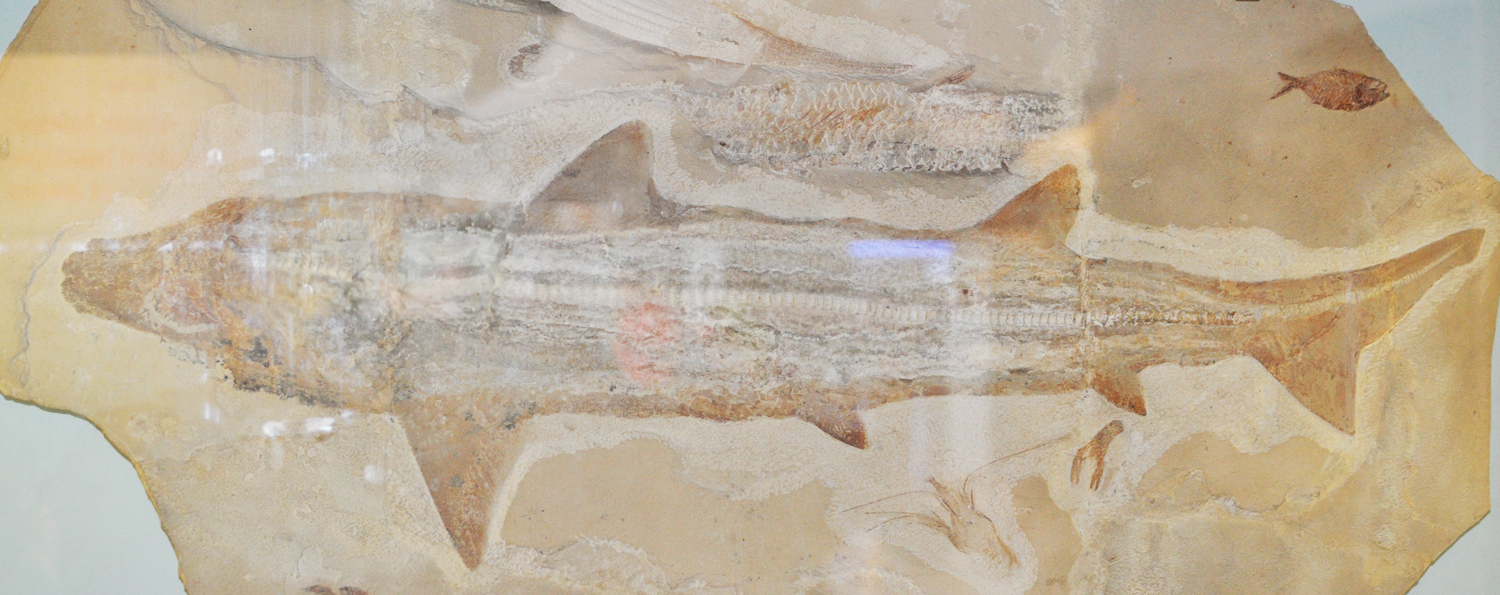
- Fossil of the Early Cretaceous-Eocene shark Cretolamna
  †Cretolamna
  - †Cretolamna appendiculata
  - †Cretolamna serrata – or unidentified comparable form
- Cucullaea
  - †Cucullaea capax
- †Cuna
  - †Cuna texana
- †Cuneolus
  - †Cuneolus pectrosa
  - †Cuneolus tippana
- Cuspidaria
  - †Cuspidaria ampulla
- †Cyclorisma
  - †Cyclorisma parva
- Cylichna
  - †Cylichna diversilirata
  - †Cylichna incisa
- †Cylindracanthus
- †Cymbophora
  - †Cymbophora appressa
  - †Cymbophora berryi
  - †Cymbophora wordeni
- †Cymella
  - †Cymella bella
- †Cyprimeria
  - †Cyprimeria alta
  - †Cyprimeria depressa
  - †Cyprimeria major

== D ==
- Dasyatis
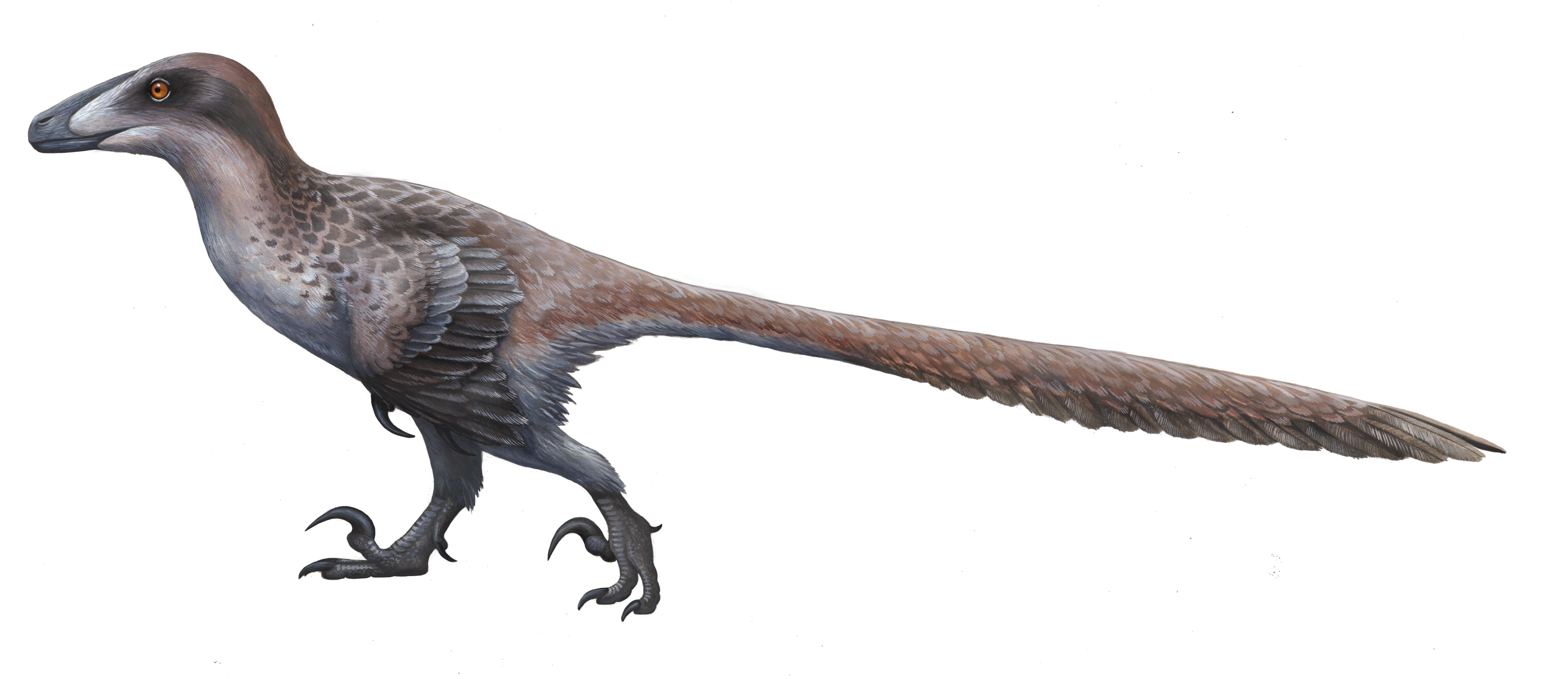
- Life restoration of the Early Cretaceous dromaeosaur ("raptor") Deinonychus
  †Deinonychus
  - †Deinonychus antirrhopus
- †Deinosuchus
  - †Deinosuchus rugosus
- †Dentalium
  - †Dentalium leve
- †Deussenia
  - †Deussenia bellalirata
  - †Deussenia ripleyana
- †Discoscaphites
  - †Discoscaphites abyssinius
  - †Discoscaphites conradi
  - †Discoscaphites gulosus
  - †Discoscaphites iris
- †Drilluta
  - †Drilluta buboanus
  - †Drilluta distans
  - †Drilluta marylandicus

== E ==
- †Egertonia
- †Ellipsoscapha
  - †Ellipsoscapha cylindrica
  - †Ellipsoscapha mortoni
  - †Ellipsoscapha occidentalis – or unidentified comparable form
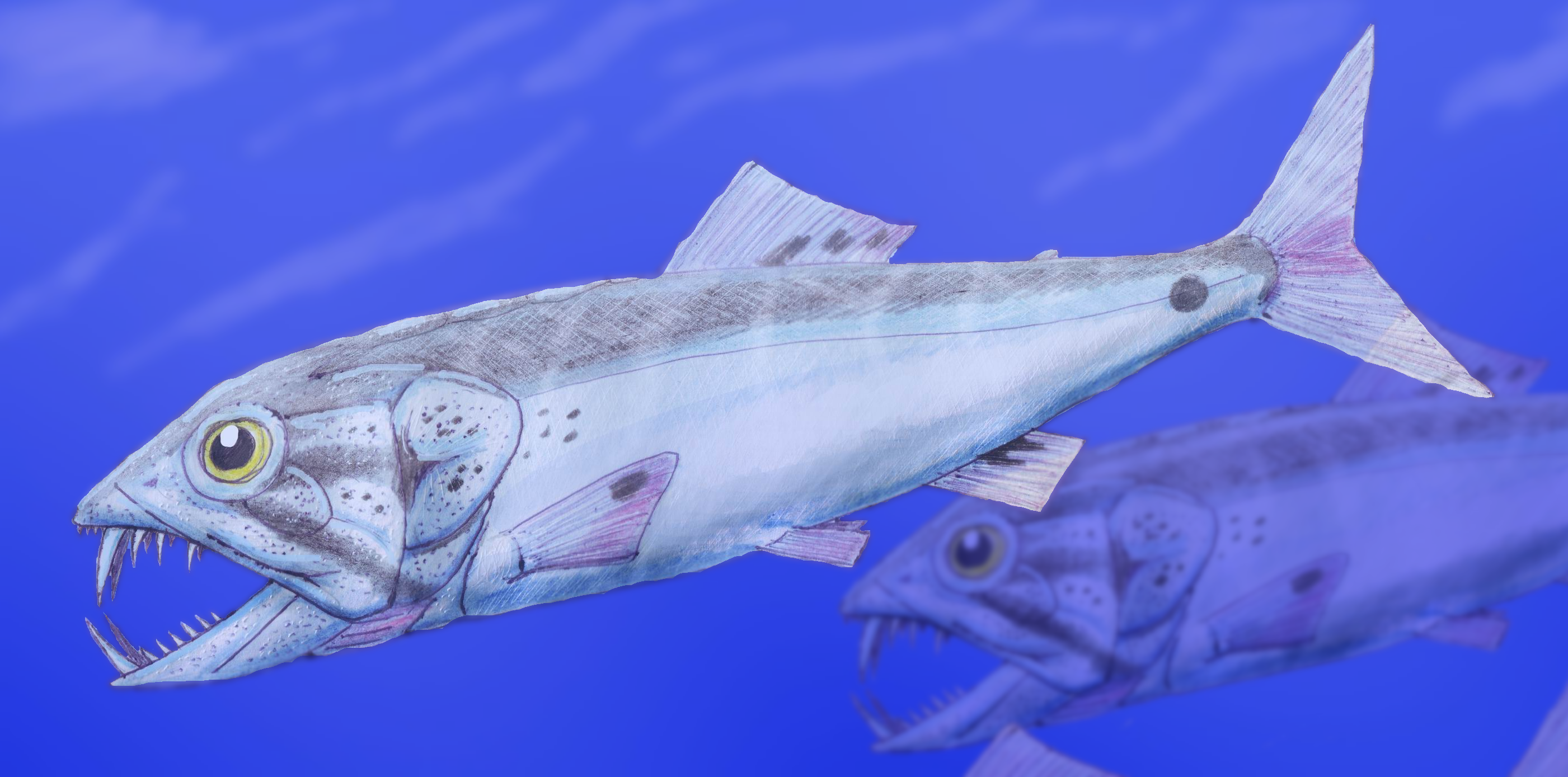
- Restoration of the Early Cretaceous-Eocene bony fish Enchodus, or the "saber-toothed herring"
  †Enchodus
  - †Enchodus dirus
  - †Enchodus ferox
  - †Enchodus feroz
- †Endoptygma
  - †Endoptygma leprosa
- †Eoacteon
  - †Eoacteon linteus
- †Etea
  - †Etea carolinensis
- †Eubaculites
  - †Eubaculites carinatus
  - †Eubaculites latecarinatus
- †Eufistulana
- †Eufistulina
- †Eulima
  - †Eulima clara
  - †Eulima monmouthensis
- †Euspira
  - †Euspira rectilabrum
  - †Euspira reetilabrum
- †Eutrephoceras
  - †Eutrephoceras dekayi
- †Ewingia
  - †Ewingia problematica
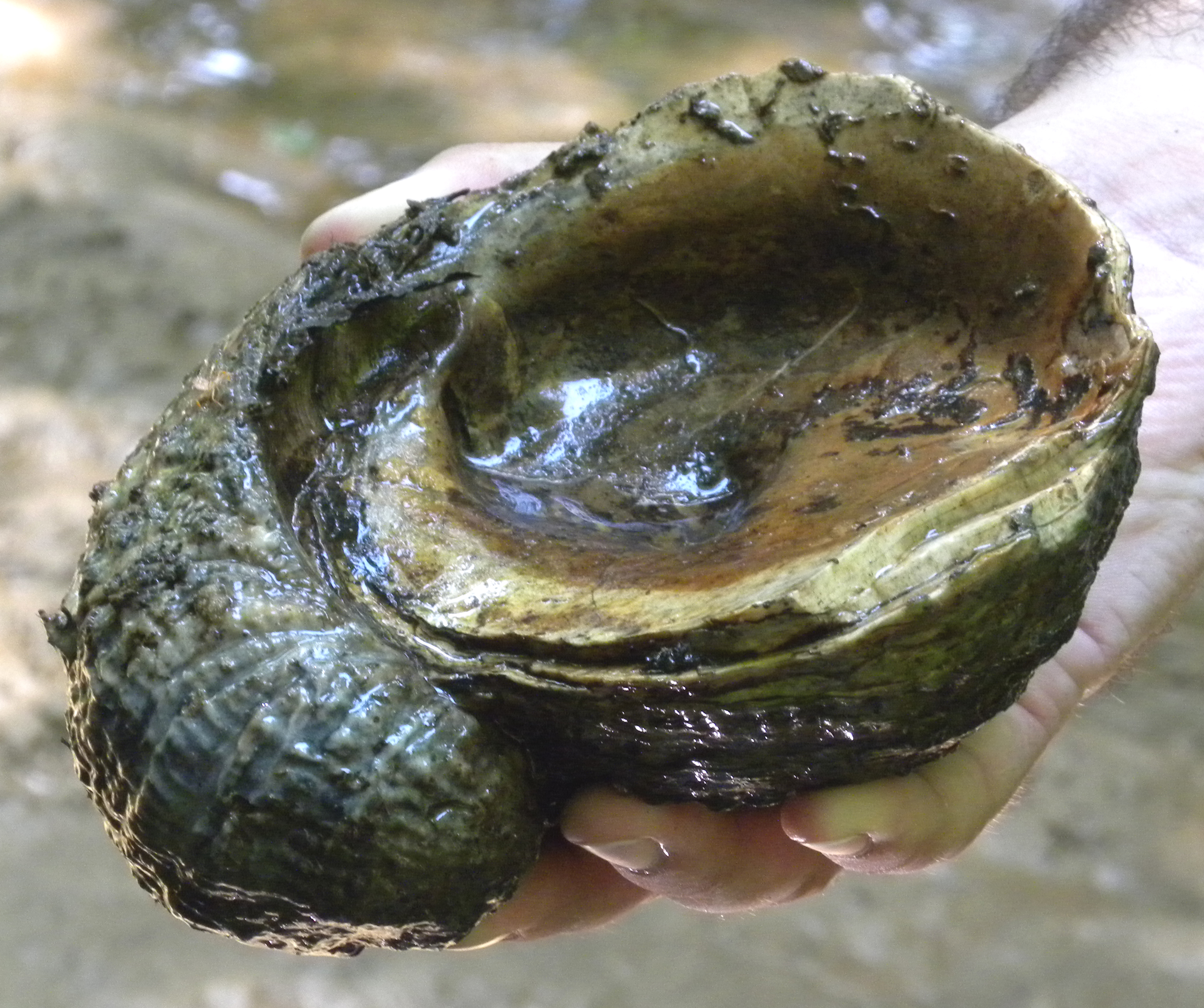
- Interior of a fossilized shell of the Jurassic-Cretaceous foam oyster Exogyra
  †Exogyra
  - †Exogyra costata

== F ==
- †Flabellosmilia
  - †Flabellosmilia vaughani
- †Fulgerca
  - †Fulgerca attenuata – or unidentified related form
- †Fusimilis
  - †Fusimilis kummeli
  - †Fusimilis novemcostatus
  - †Fusimilis tippanus

== G ==
- Galeorhinus
  - †Galeorhinus giradoti
- Ginglymostoma
- Glossus
- Glycimeris
  - †Glycimeris mortoni
- Glycymeris
  - †Glycymeris rotundata
- †Glyptops
  - †Glyptops caelatus – type locality for species
- †Goniochasma
- †Goniopholis
  - †Goniopholis affinis – type locality for species
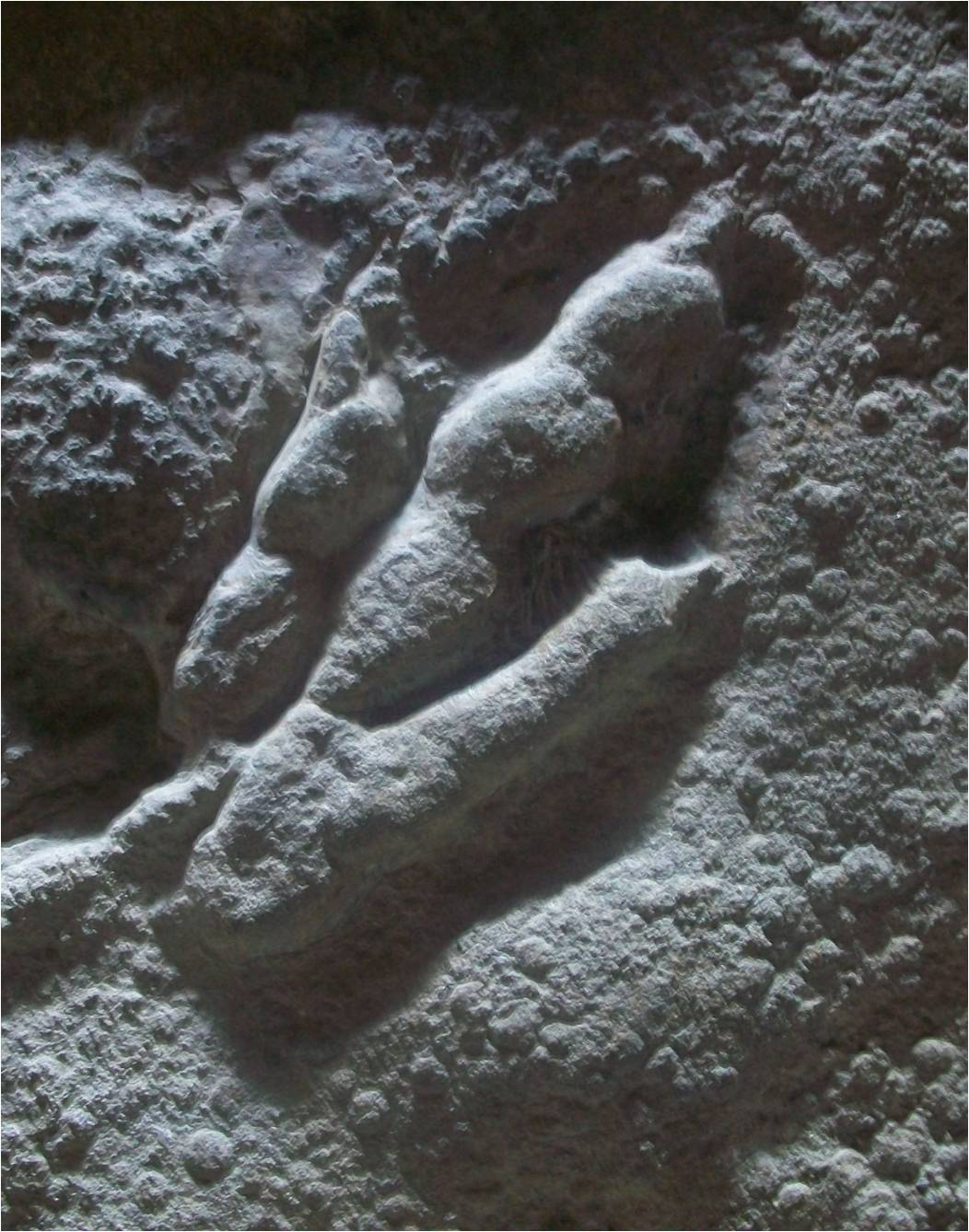
- Fossil negative with skin impressions of the theropod dinosaur footprint ichnogenus Grallator
  †Grallator – or unidentified comparable form
- †Granocardium
  - †Granocardium dumosum
  - †Granocardium eufalense
  - †Granocardium kuemmeli
  - †Granocardium kummeli
  - †Granocardium lowei
- †Graphidula
  - †Graphidula multicostata
  - †Graphidula terebriformis
- †Gryphaeostrea
  - †Gryphaeostrea vomer
- Gyrodes
  - †Gyrodes americanus
  - †Gyrodes spillmani
  - †Gyrodes subcarinatus
  - †Gyrodes supraplicatus

== H ==
- †Hadrodus
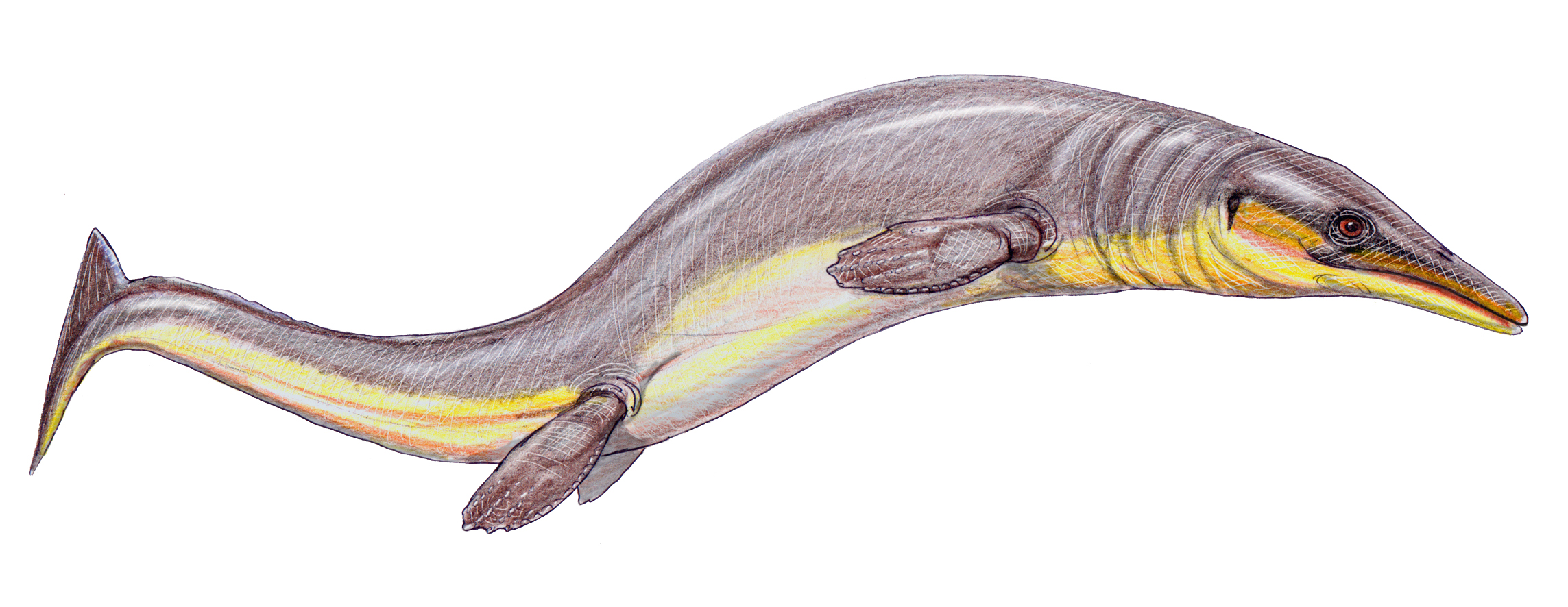
- Life restoration of the Late Cretaceous mosasaur Halisaurus
  †Halisaurus
  - †Halisaurus platyspondylus
- †Hamatia – type locality for genus
  - †Hamatia elkneckensis – type locality for species
- †Hamulus
  - †Hamulus falcatus
  - †Hamulus huntensis – tentative report
  - †Hamulus onyx
  - †Hamulus squamosus
- †Hercorhynchus
  - †Hercorhynchus trililatus
- †Hercorhyncus
  - †Hercorhyncus pagodaformis
  - †Hercorhyncus tippanus
- Heterodontus
- †Heteromorpha
  - †Heteromorpha ammonite
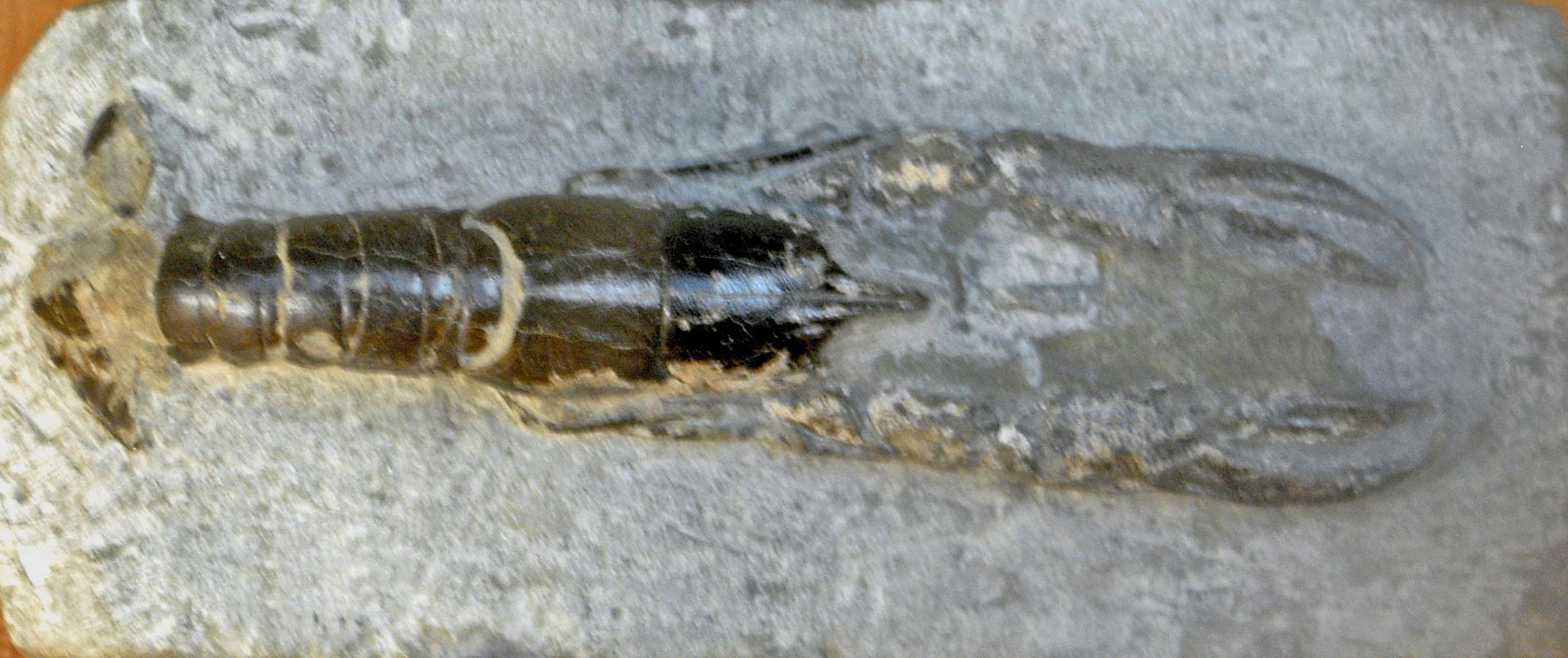
- Fossil of the Jurassic-Paleogene lobster Hoploparia
  †Hoploparia
  - †Hoploparia gladiator
- †Hybodus
- †Hydrotribulus
  - †Hydrotribulus asper
- †Hyposaurus
  - †Hyposaurus rogersii
- †Hypotodus
- †Hypsiloichnus – type locality for genus
  - †Hypsiloichnus marylandicus – type locality for species

== I ==
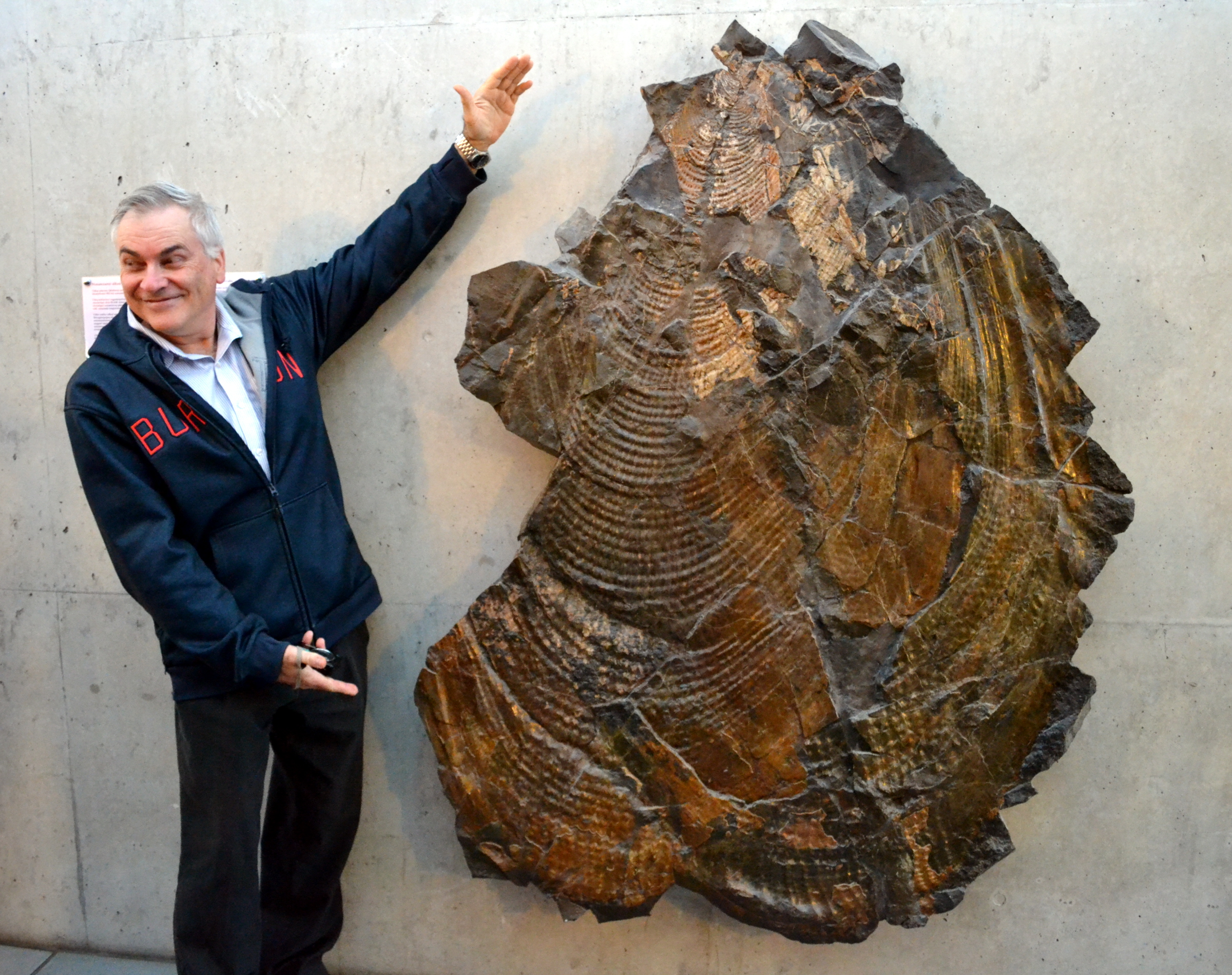
- Fossilized shell of the Early Jurassic-Late Cretaceous marine bivalve Inoceramus with a human indicating its size
  †Inoceramus
- †Ischyodus
- †Ischyrhiza
  - †Ischyrhiza avonicola – or unidentified comparable form
  - †Ischyrhiza mira

== J ==
- †Jeletzkytes
  - †Jeletzkytes criptonodosus
  - †Jeletzkytes nebrascensis
- Juliacorbula
  - †Juliacorbula monmouthensis

== L ==
- Laternula
  - †Laternula robusta
- †Latiala
  - †Latiala lobata – or unidentified comparable form
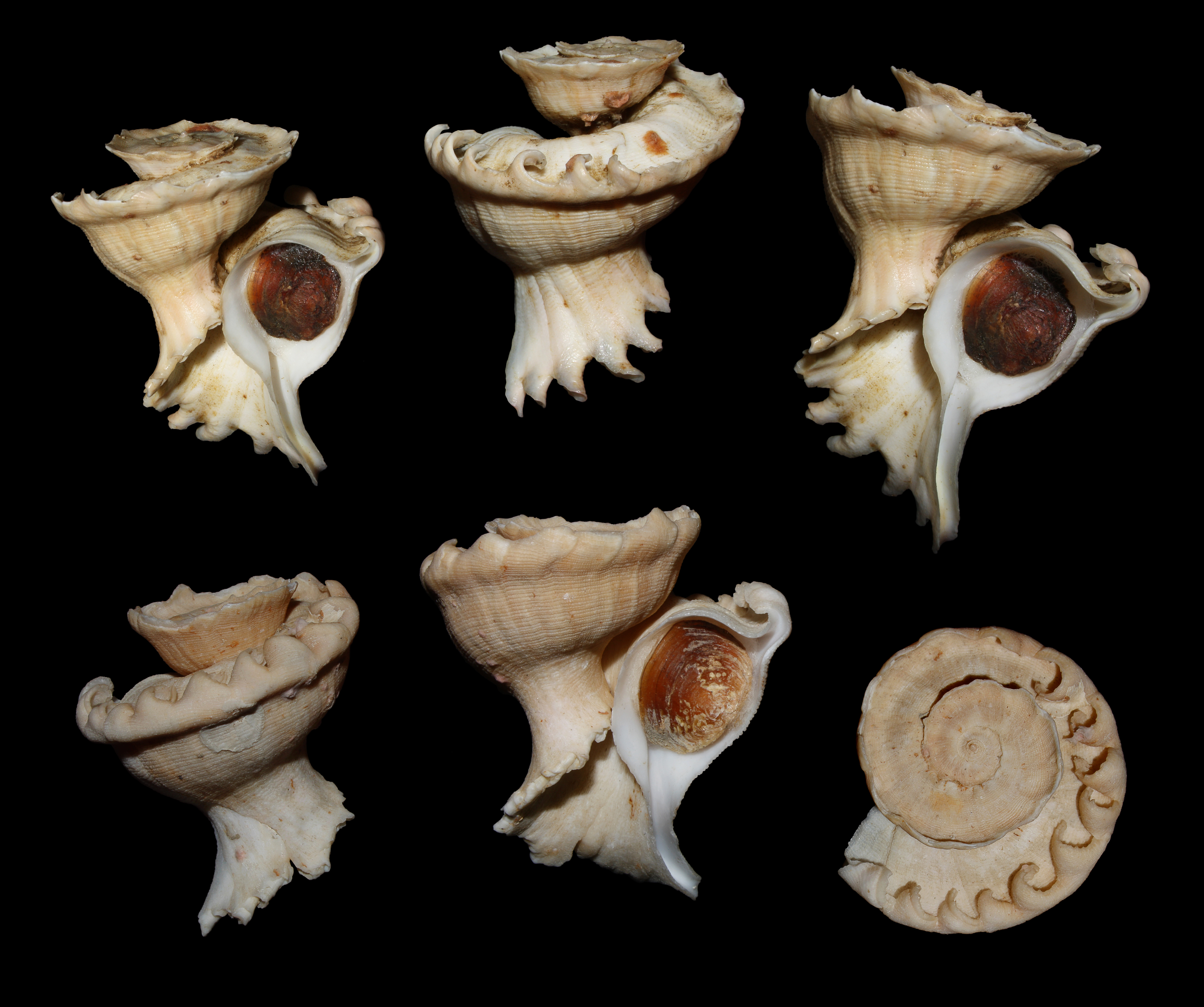
- Shells in multiple views of Latiaxis coral sea snails
  Latiaxis
- †Legumen
  - †Legumen ellipticum
  - †Legumen planulatum
- Lepisosteus
- †Leptosolen
  - †Leptosolen biplicata
  - †Leptosolen elongata
- Lima
  - †Lima pelagica
- Limatula
  - †Limatula acutilineata
- †Linearia
  - †Linearia crebelli
- †Linearis
  - †Linearis metastriata
- †Liopeplum
  - †Liopeplum canalis
  - †Liopeplum coronatum
  - †Liopeplum cretaceum
- †Liopistha
  - †Liopistha prolexta
  - †Liopistha protexta
- Lithophaga
  - †Lithophaga carolinensis
  - †Lithophaga julia
- †Longitubus
  - †Longitubus lineatus
- †Longoconcha
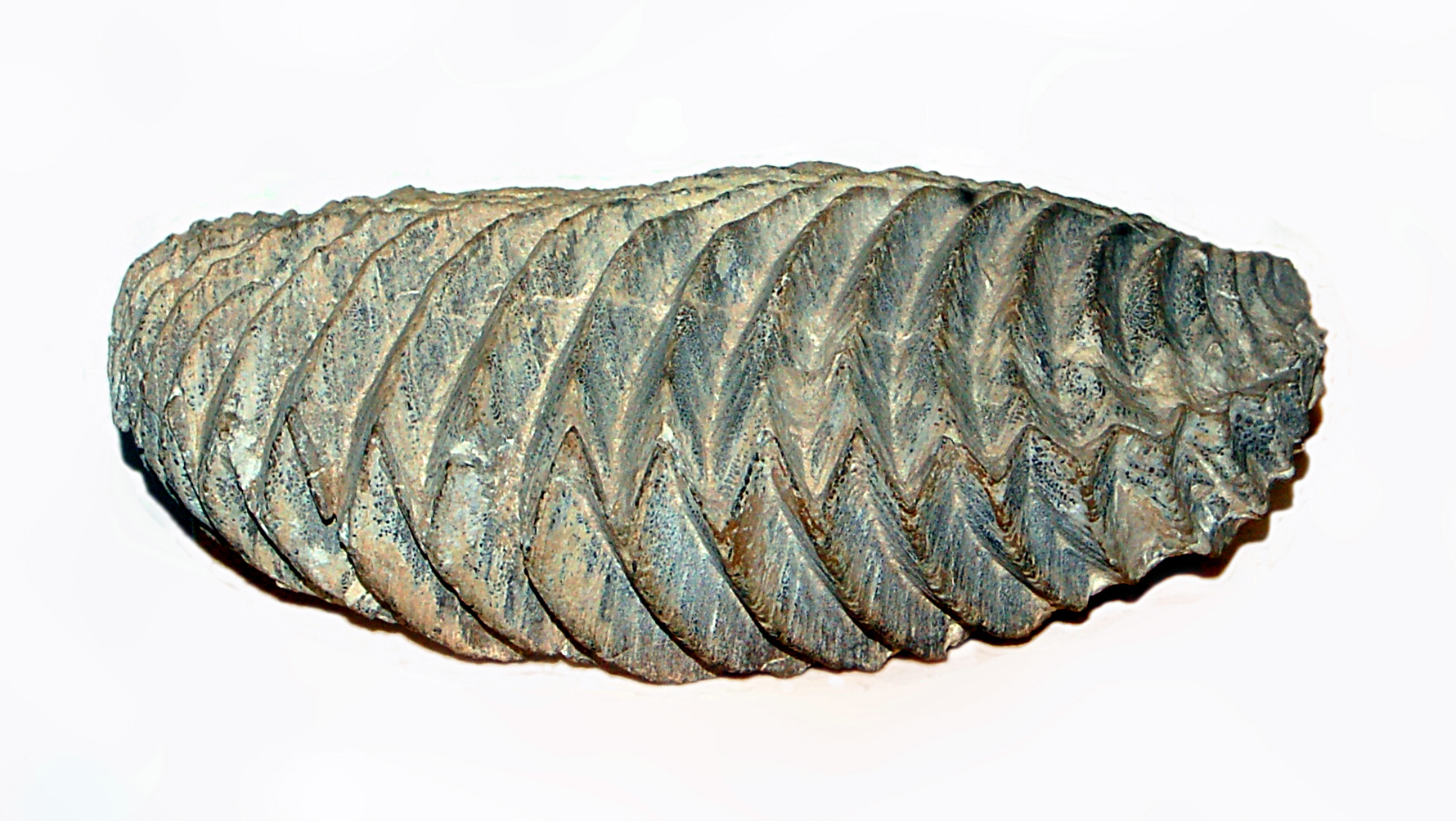
- Fossilized shell of the Triassic-modern marine bivalve Lopha
  Lopha
  - †Lopha falcata
  - †Lopha mesenterica
- †Lowenstamia
  - †Lowenstamia cucullata
- †Loxsomopteris – type locality for genus
  - †Loxsomopteris anasilla – type locality for species
- †Lupira
- †Lycettia
  - †Lycettia tippana
  - †Lycettia tippanus
- †Lyriochlamys
  - †Lyriochlamys cretosa
  - †Lyriochlamys cretosus

== M ==
- Malletia
  - †Malletia littlei
  - †Malletia longfrons
  - †Malletia longifrons
  - †Malletia stephensoni
- †Mathilda
  - †Mathilda cedarensis – or unidentified comparable form
  - †Mathilda corona
- †Mauldinia – type locality for genus
  - †Mauldinia mirabilis – type locality for species
- †Menabites
  - †Menabites delawarensis
  - †Menabites vanuxemi
- †Mesostoma
- †Micrabacia
  - †Micrabacia marylandica
  - †Micrabacia radiata
- †Modiolus
  - †Modiolus sedesclaris
  - †Modiolus sedesclarus
  - †Modiolus trigonus
- †Morea
  - †Morea cancellaria
  - †Morea marylandica
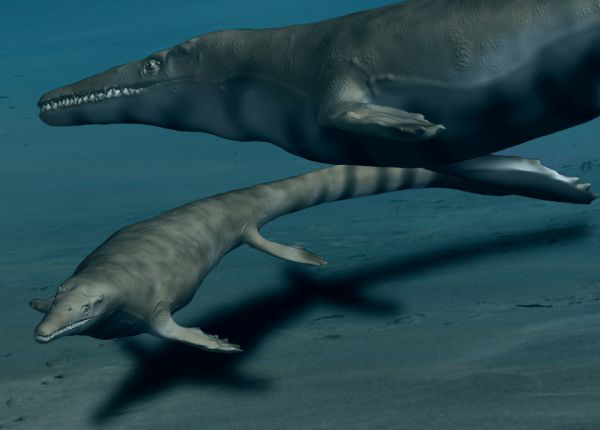
- Life restoration of two of the Late Cretaceous Mosasaurus
  †Mosasaurus
  - †Mosasaurus conodon
  - †Mosasaurus dekayi
  - †Mosasaurus maximus
- Myliobatis
  - †Myliobatis obesus
- †Myobarbum
  - †Myobarbum monmouthensis – tentative report
- Myrtea
  - †Myrtea stephensoni
- †Mytilus – tentative report

== N ==
- †Napulus
  - †Napulus octoliratus
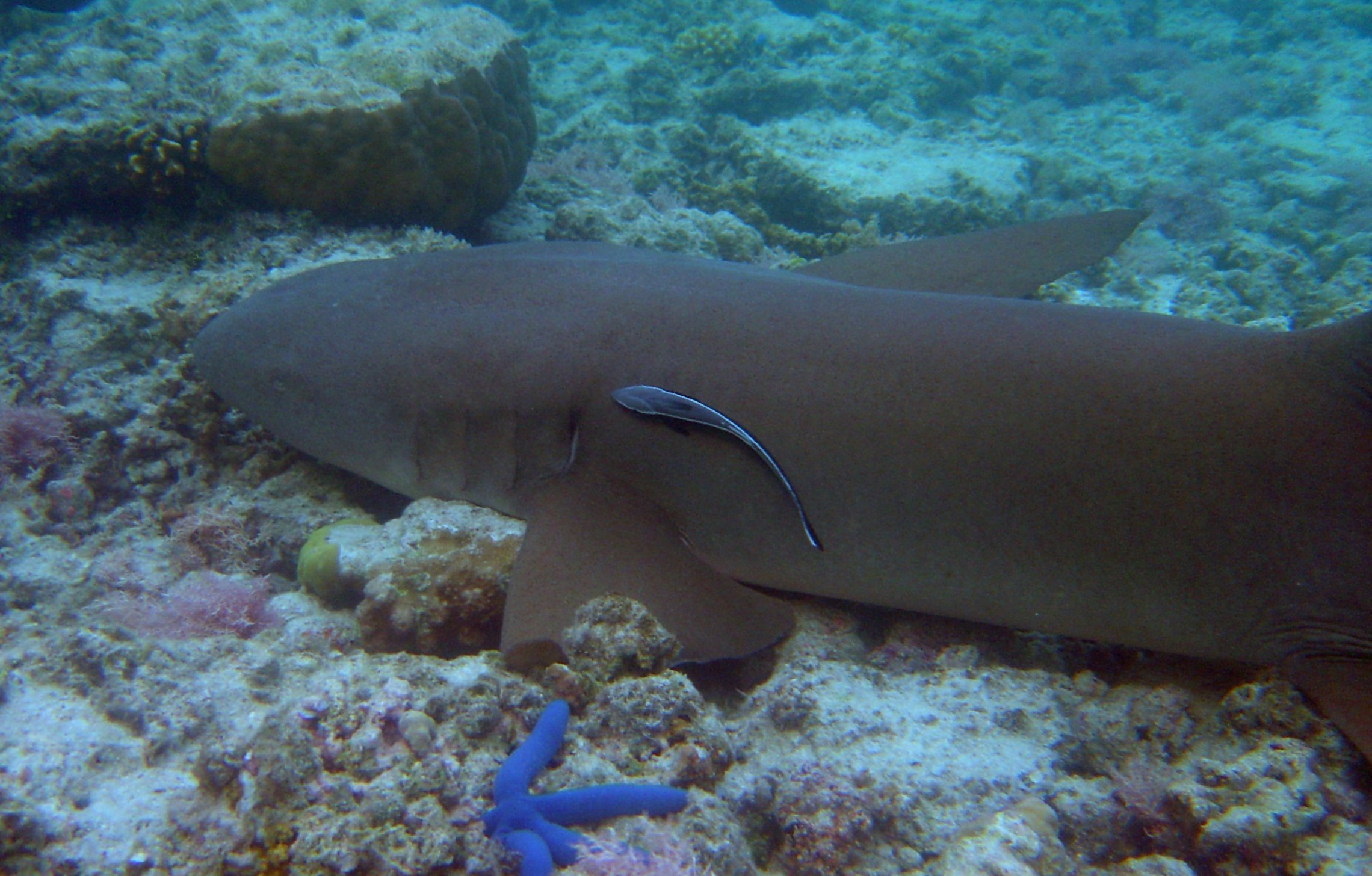
- Close-up portrait of a living Nebrius nurse shark
  Nebrius
- †Nemodon
  - †Nemodon eufalensis
  - †Nemodon eufaulensis
  - †Nemodon stantoni
- †Nonactaeonina
  - †Nonactaeonina graphoides – or unidentified comparable form
- Nucula
  - †Nucula camia
  - †Nucula cuneifrons
  - †Nucula percrassa
  - †Nucula perequalis
  - †Nucula severnensis
  - †Nucula slackiana
- Nuculana
  - †Nuculana rostratruncata
  - †Nuculana whitfieldi
- †Nymphalucina
  - †Nymphalucina linearia

== O ==
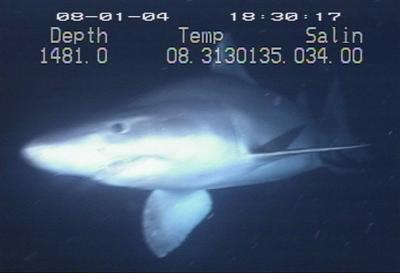
- A living Odontaspis sand shark
  Odontaspis
  - †Odontaspis aculeatus
  - †Odontaspis macrota
- †Odontobasis
  - †Odontobasis sulcata – or unidentified comparable form
- †Oligoptycha
- †Opertochasma
- †Osteopygis
  - †Osteopygis emarginatus

== P ==
- †Paladmete
  - †Paladmete cancellaria
  - †Paladmete laevis
- †Paleopsephaea
  - †Paleopsephaea tenuilirata
- Panopea
  - †Panopea decisa
  - †Panopea monmouthensis
- †Paralbula
  - †Paralbula casei
- †Parmicorbula
  - †Parmicorbula percompressa
  - †Parmicorbula terramaria
- †Pelletixia
  - †Pelletixia amelguita – type locality for species
- †Periplomya
- †Peritresius
  - †Peritresius ornatus
- †Perrisonota
  - †Perrisonota littlei
  - †Perrisonota protexta
- †Phelopteria
  - †Phelopteria linguaeformis
  - †Phelopteria linguiformis
- Pholas
- †Pinna
  - †Pinna laqueata
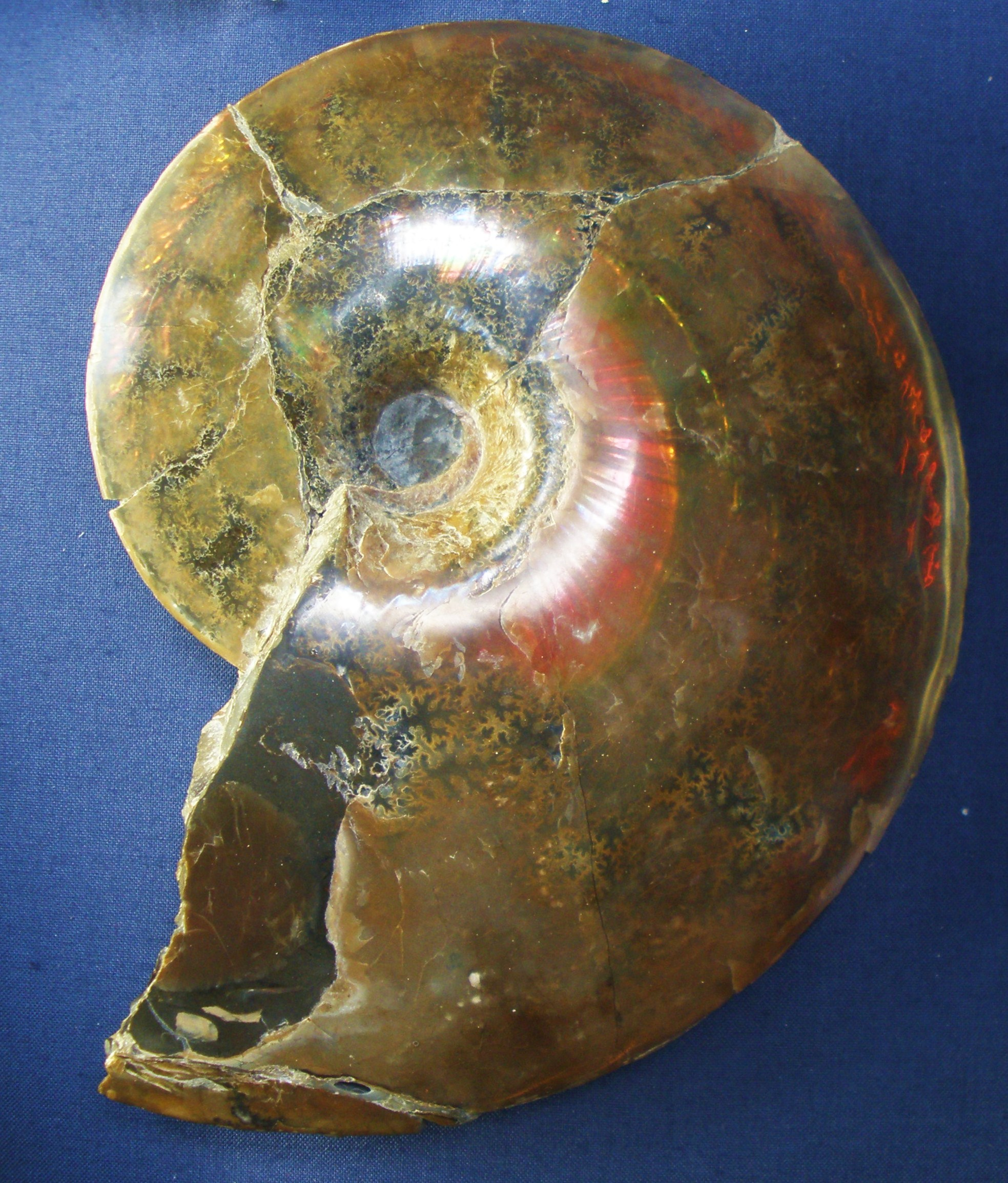
- Fossilized shell of the Late Cretaceous ammonoid cephalopod Placenticeras
  †Placenticeras
  - †Placenticeras placenta
  - †Placenticeras syrtale
- †Platananthus
  - †Platananthus potomacensis – type locality for species
- †Platanocarpus – type locality for genus
  - †Platanocarpus elkneckensis – type locality for species
  - †Platanocarpus marylandensis – type locality for species
- †Pleuriocardia
  - †Pleuriocardia eufalensis
- †Pleurocoelus – type locality for genus
  - †Pleurocoelus altus – type locality for species
  - †Pleurocoelus nanus – type locality for species
- †Plicatoscyllium
  - †Plicatoscyllium antiquum
  - †Plicatoscyllium derameei
- Polinices
  - †Polinices kummeli
- †Postligata
  - †Postligata wordeni
- †Praeleda
  - †Praeleda compar
- †Priconodon – type locality for genus
  - †Priconodon crassus – type locality for species
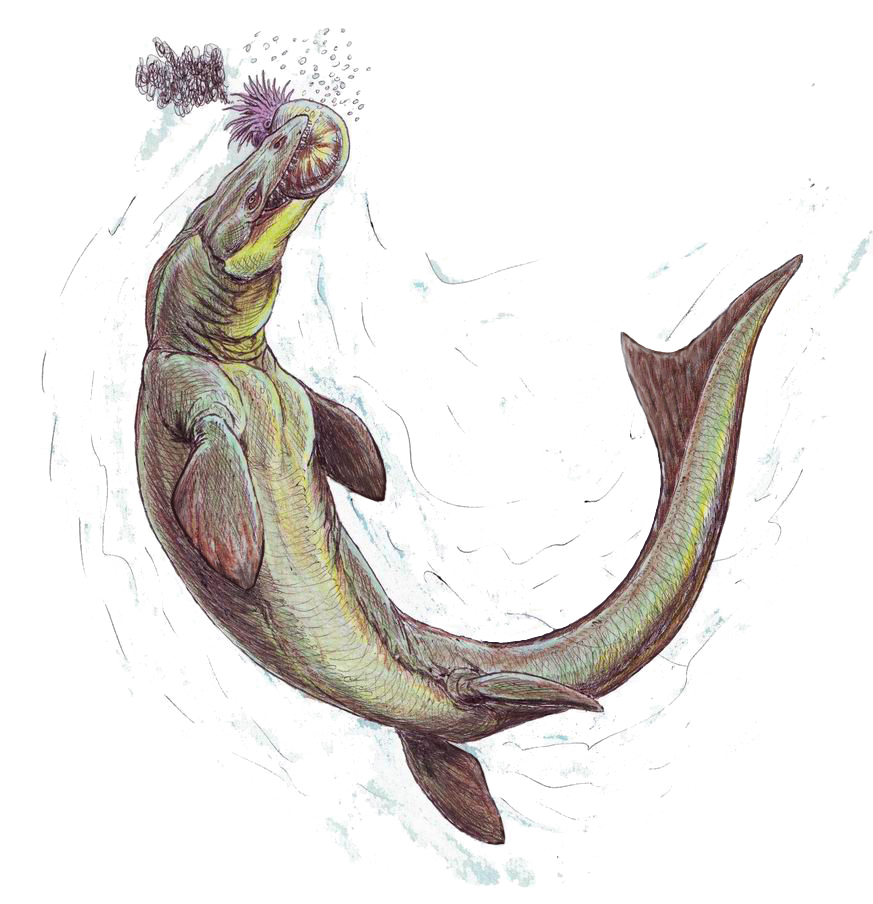
- Life restoration of the Late Cretaceous mosasaur Prognathodon preying upon an ammonoid cephalopod
  †Prognathodon
  - †Prognathodon rapax
- †Promathildia
  - †Promathildia parvula – or unidentified comparable form
- †Propanoplosaurus – type locality for genus
  - †Propanoplosaurus marylandicus – type locality for species
- †Protocallianassa
  - †Protocallianassa mortoni
- †Protocardia
  - †Protocardia spillmani
- †Pseudohypolophus
  - †Pseudohypolophus menultyi
- †Pseudolimea
  - †Pseudolimea reticulata
  - †Pseudolimea serrata
- Pseudomalaxis
  - †Pseudomalaxis pateriformis
  - †Pseudomalaxis pilsbryi
  - †Pseudomalaxis stantoni
- †Pteria
  - †Pteria rhombica
- †Pterocerella
  - †Pterocerella tippana
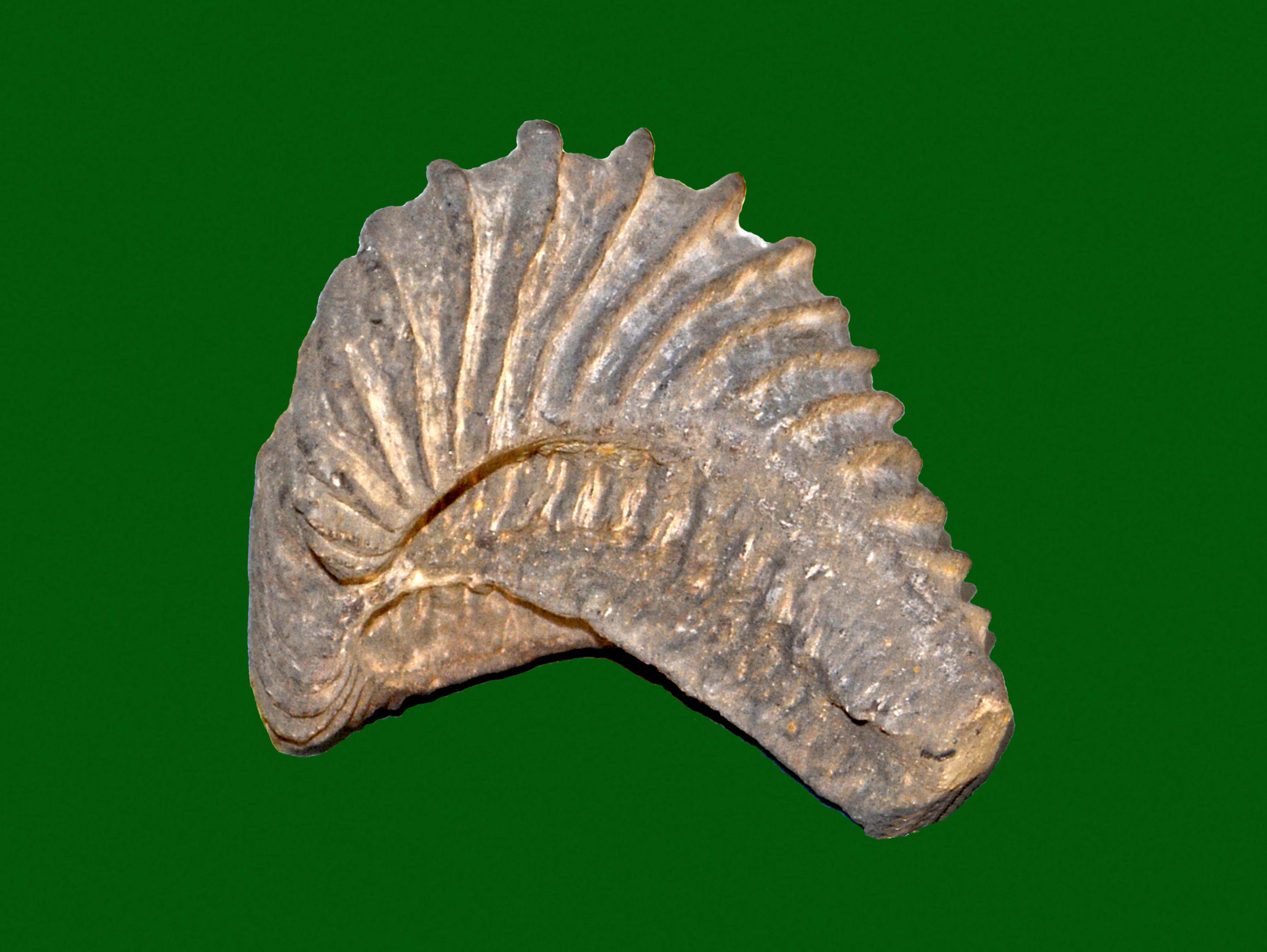
- Fossilized shell of the Jurassic-Cretaceous marine bivalve Pterotrigonia
  †Pterotrigonia
  - †Pterotrigonia eufalensis
  - †Pterotrigonia eufaulensis
  - †Pterotrigonia thoracica
- †Ptychotrygon
  - †Ptychotrygon vermiculata
- †Pugnellus
  - †Pugnellus densatus
- Pycnodonte
  - †Pycnodonte vesicularis
- †Pyrifusus
  - †Pyrifusus crassus
  - †Pyrifusus subdensatus
- †Pyropsis
  - †Pyropsis perlata
  - †Pyropsis prolixa

== R ==
- Raja
  - †Raja farishi
- †Remera
  - †Remera cretacea – or unidentified comparable form
  - †Remera flexicostata
  - †Remera juncea
- †Remnita
  - †Remnita anomalocostata
  - †Remnita biacuminata – or unidentified comparable form
  - †Remnita hastata
- Rhinobatos
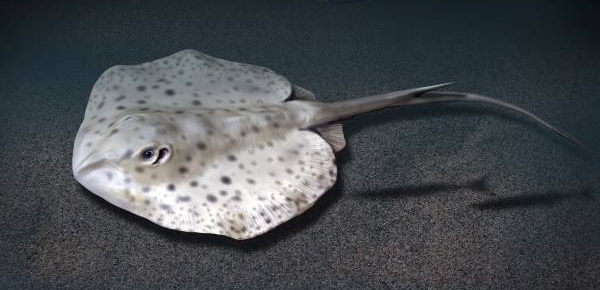
- Restoration of the Late Cretaceous-Paleocene ray Rhombodus
  †Rhombodus
  - †Rhombodus binkhorsti
- †Rhombopsis
- Ringicula
  - †Ringicula clarki
  - †Ringicula pulchella
- Rissoina
  - †Rissoina tennesseensis

== S ==
- †Sargana
  - †Sargana stantoni
- †Scambula
  - †Scambula perplana
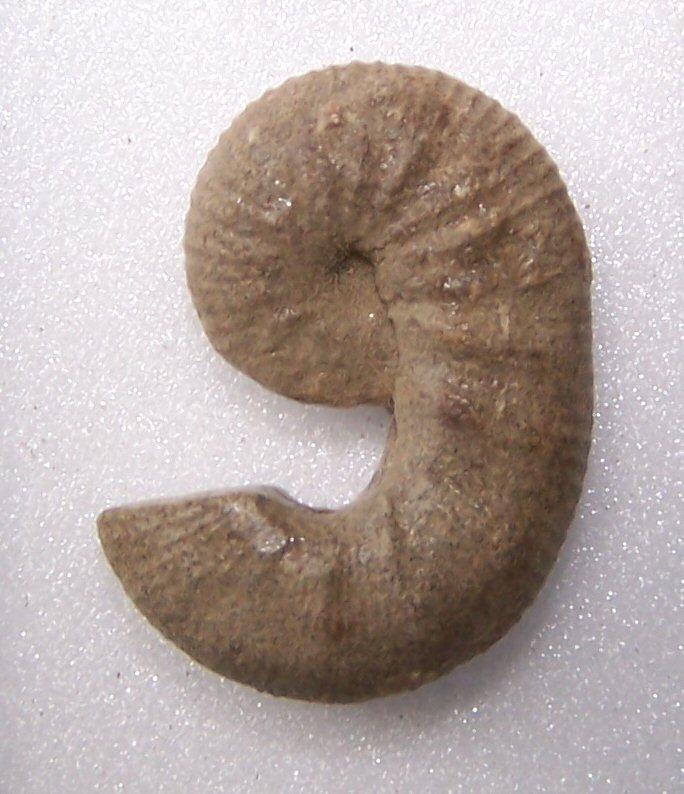
- Fossilized shell of the Late Cretaceous ammonoid cephalopod Scaphites
  †Scaphites
  - †Scaphites hippocrepis
- Serpula
- †Serratolamna
  - †Serratolamna serrata
- †Serrifusus – tentative report
- †Solariorbis
  - †Solariorbis clara – or unidentified comparable form
- †Solyma
  - †Solyma elliptica
  - †Solyma gardnerae
- †Sourimis
  - †Sourimis georgiana – tentative report
- †Spanomera
  - †Spanomera marylandensis
- †Sphenodiscus
  - †Sphenodiscus lobatus
  - †Sphenodiscus pleurisepta
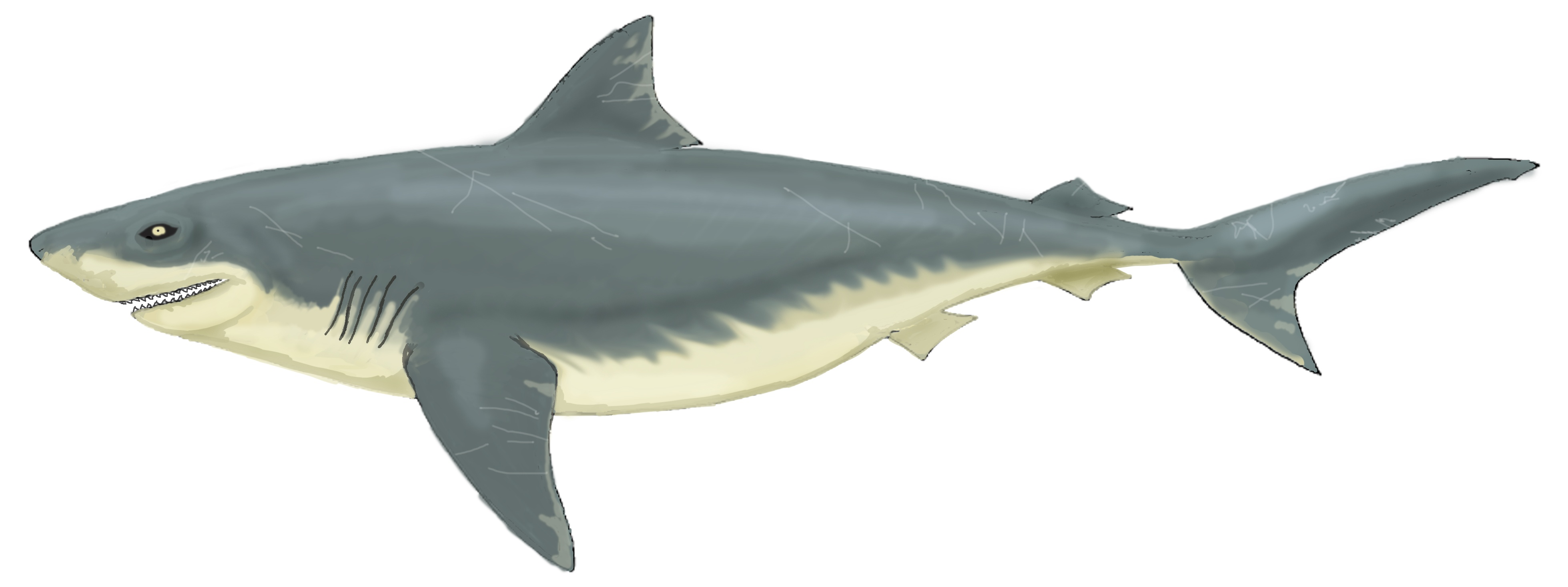
- Life restoration of the Late Cretaceous shark Squalicorax
  Squalicorax
  - †Squalicorax falcatus
  - †Squalicorax kaupi
  - †Squalicorax pristodontus
- Squatina
  - †Squatina hassei
- †Stantonella
  - †Stantonella interrupta
- †Stephanodus
- Striarca
  - †Striarca cuneata
  - †Striarca saffordi
- †Striaticostatum
  - †Striaticostatum sparsum
- †Striatopollis
  - †Striatopollis paraneus
  - †Striatopollis vermimurus
- †Syncyclonema
  - †Syncyclonema simplicius

== T ==
- Tellina
- †Tellinimera
  - †Tellinimera buboana
  - †Tellinimera gabbi
- †Tenea
  - †Tenea parilis
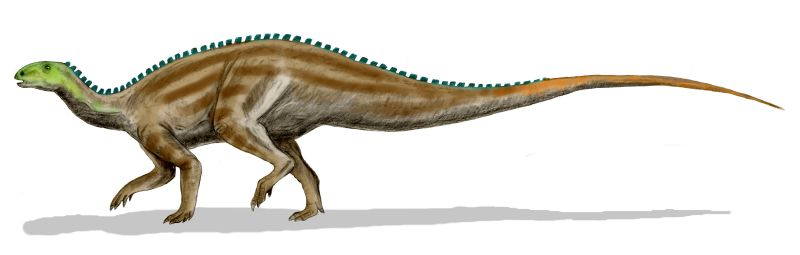
- Life restoration of the Early Cretaceous Iguanodon relative Tenontosaurus
  †Tenontosaurus
- †Tenuipteria
  - †Tenuipteria argentea
  - †Tenuipteria argenteus
- †Thoracosaurus
  - †Thoracosaurus neocesariensis
- Trachycardium
  - †Trachycardium eufaulensis
- †Trachytriton
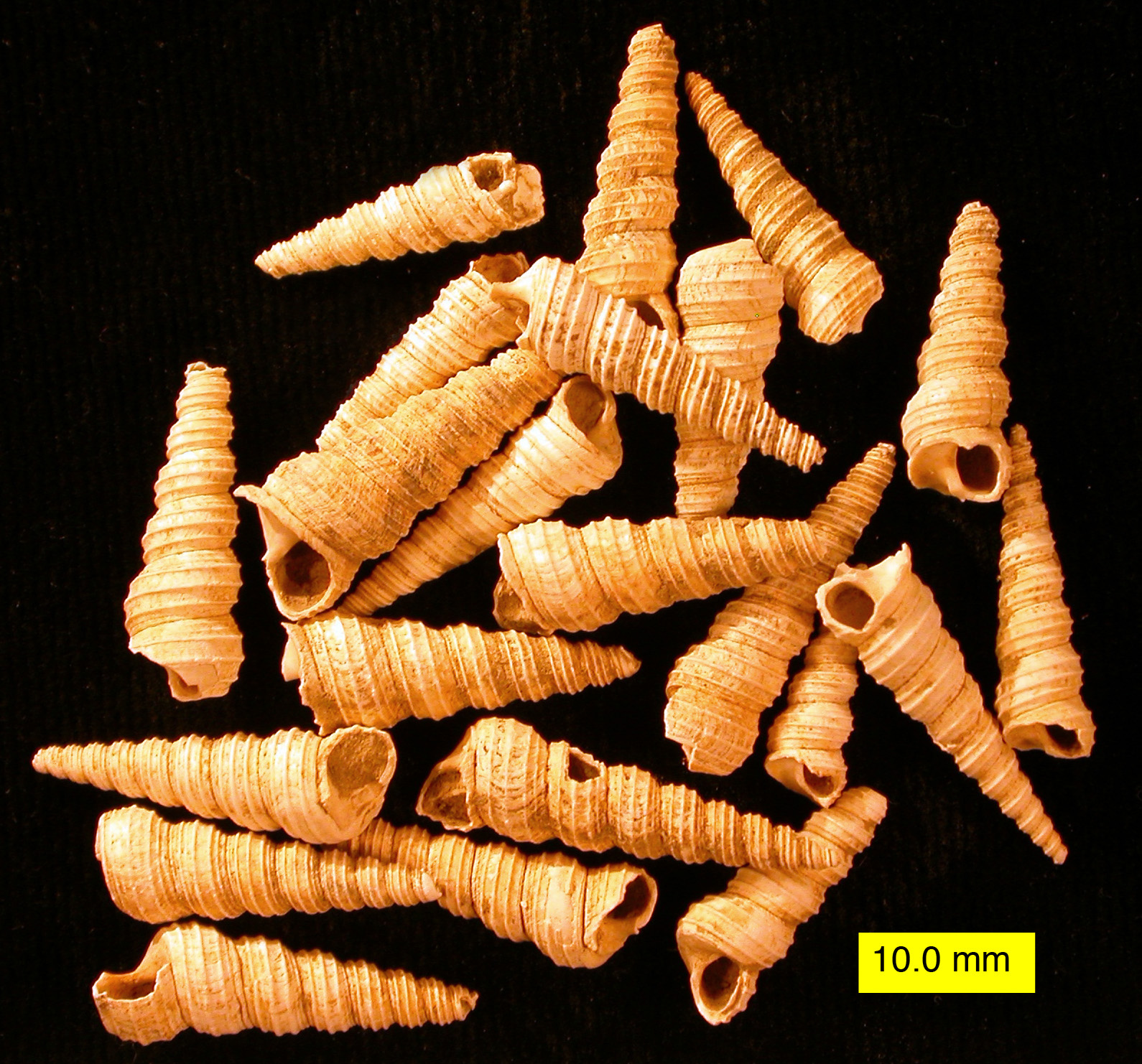
- Fossilized shells of the Late Jurassic-modern tower snail Turritella
  Turritella
  - †Turritella bilira
  - †Turritella hilgardi
  - †Turritella paravertebroides
  - †Turritella tippana
  - †Turritella trilira
  - †Turritella vertebroides

== U ==
- †Urceolabrum
  - †Urceolabrum tuberculatum

== V ==
- †Veniella
  - †Veniella conradi
- †Vetericardiella
  - †Vetericardiella crenalirata
- †Vorhisia

== W ==
- †Weeksia
  - †Weeksia peplanata

== X ==
- †Xylophagella
  - †Xylophagella irregularis
