= Arundelconodon =

Arundelconodon Temporal range: Early Albian (?)

Scientific classification
- Kingdom: Animalia
- Phylum: Chordata
- Class: Mammalia
- Order: †Eutriconodonta
- Family: †Triconodontidae
- Subfamily: †Alticonodontinae
- Genus: †Arundelconodon; Cifelli et al., 1999

Type species
- Arundelconodon hottoni Cifelli et al., 1999

Extinct genus of mammals

Arundelconodon is an extinct genus of mammal of the family Triconodontidae, containing the species Arundelconodon hottoni. It is known from multiple dental remains from the Arundel Clay in Maryland, United States, dated to the Early Cretaceous. The remains consist jawbone fragments with premolar, molar, and canine teeth. Its anatomic features are intermediate between Jurassic and later Cretaceous triconodonts. The deposits from which it is known represent either a fringe swamp or a floodplain, likely near a coast.

== Discovery and naming ==
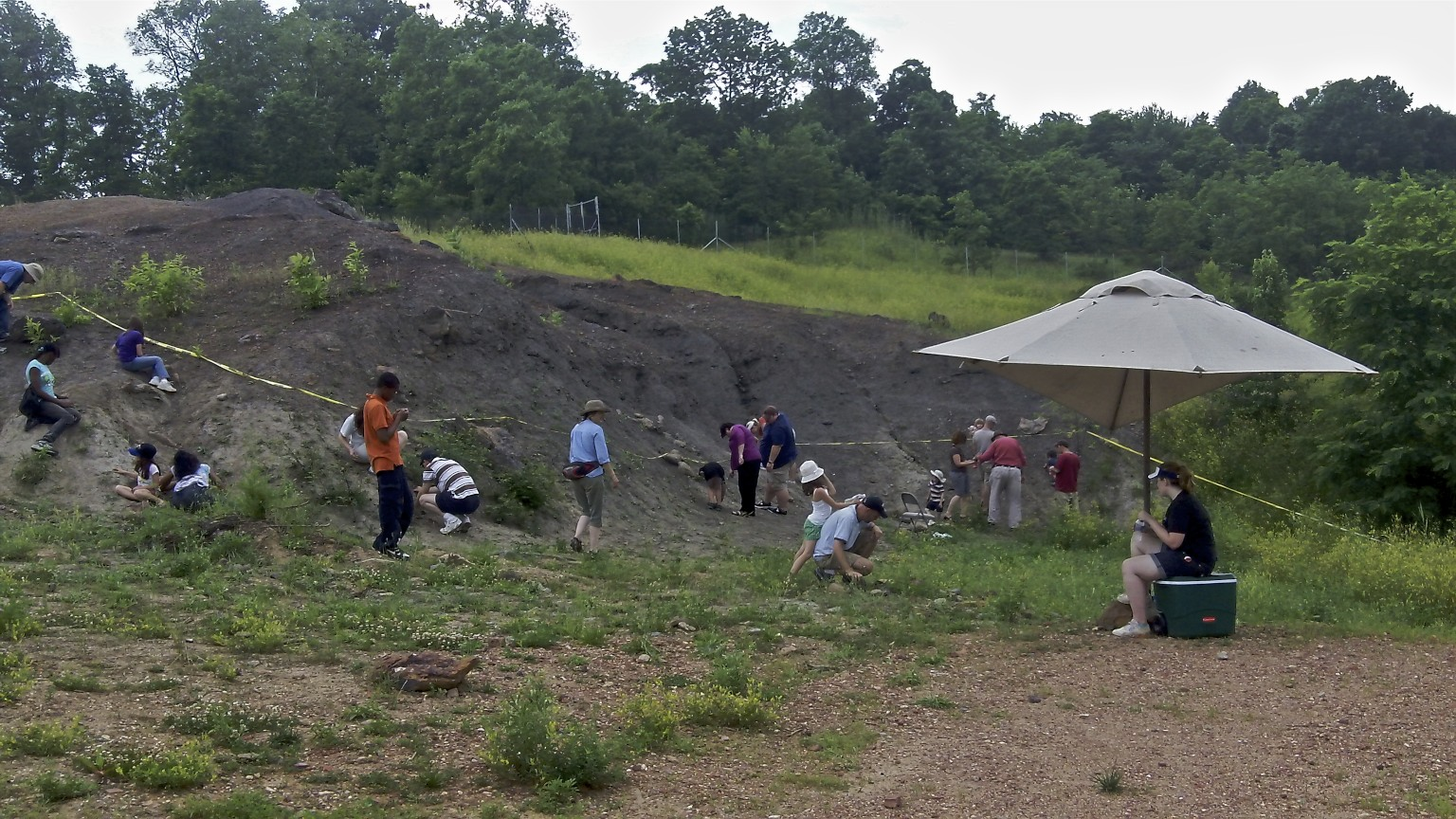
Excavation of an exposed portion of the Arundel Clay, where Arundelconodon was first discovered

The type specimen of the genus Arundelconodon was described by paleontologist Richard L. Cifelli and colleagues in 1999. The type species was named Arundelcodon hottoni. Their description was based on a "remarkably complete" jaw from the Arundel Clay of Maryland, United States. The genus name comes from the words Arundel, in reference to the Arundel Clay where the remains were found (itself named after Anne Arundel County, Maryland, named in honor of Anne Arundell, wife of the first proprietor of Maryland, Cecil Calvert), and conodon, which is Greek for "cone-tooth". The specific name, hottoni, was given in recognition of the contributions of Nicholas Hotton to vertebrate paleontology. In 2001, paleontologist Kenneth D. Rose and colleagues described additional mammalian remains from the same fossil beds, which were tentatively assigned to A. hottoni.

== Description ==
The holotype of Arundelconodon consists of a right mandibular ramus (the upward-extending portion on the side of the lower jaw) with five teeth: two premolars and three molars. The two premolars are large in relation to the molars, with each possessing four cusps. The teeth range from 2.89 millimeters (0.114 in) to 3.43 millimeters (0.135 in) in length and 1.03 millimeters (0.041 in) to 1.30 millimeters (0.051 in) in width, all possessing two "well-divided" roots. The only preserved alveoli (tooth sockets) are those containing the teeth. The entirety of the preserved portion of the jaw is less than 25 millimeters (0.98 in) long. Cifelli and colleagues assigned the genus to the family Triconodontidae, with its distinguishing features including the size and shape of its cusps; its weak, discontinuous lingual (facing the tongue) cingulid (a ridge found on the lower molars of certain mammals); an interlocking system between molars, where the front and back sides of the molars have a groove and a ridge, respectively, that extend from the crown to the root; and the presence of a Meckelian groove, the last of which they described as noteworthy, as it is a basal ("primitive") feature found in many early mammals and their relatives that is absent from other North American Cretaceous triconodonts.

The remains described in 2001 consist of two pieces of a jawbone, which the researchers believed could most likely be rejoined at the lower margin. Seven complete alveoli are preserved, representing canine teeth, molars, and premolars. As with the holotype, a distinct Meckelian groove is present. The researchers interpreted the specimen as representative of an immature individual. Despite its young age, the condition of the alveoli indicates that the premolar teeth are permanent.

== Classification ==
Cifelli and colleagues described Arundelconodon as an intermediate between Jurassic and Cretaceous triconodontids, with some of its features advanced in comparison to genera from the Jurassic and earliest Cretaceous (such as Triconodon, Trioracodon, and Priacodon), while others are primitive in comparison to later Cretaceous triconodontids (such as Astroconodon, Corviconodon, and Jugulator). Since then, multiple phylogenetic studies have supported the placement of Arundelconodon as the most basal member of Alticonodontinae, a subfamily of Triconodontidae.

Phylogeny of Triconodontidae, according to Gaetano & Rougier, 2011

- Triconodontidae
  - Priacodon
  - - Triconodon
    - - Trioracodon
      - Alticonodontinae
        - Arundelconodon
        - - - Meiconodon
            - - Astroconodon
              - - Alticonodon
                - Corviconodon
          - - Jugulator
            - Volaticotherini
              - Ichthyoconodon
              - - Argentoconodon
                - Volaticotherium

== Paleoecology ==
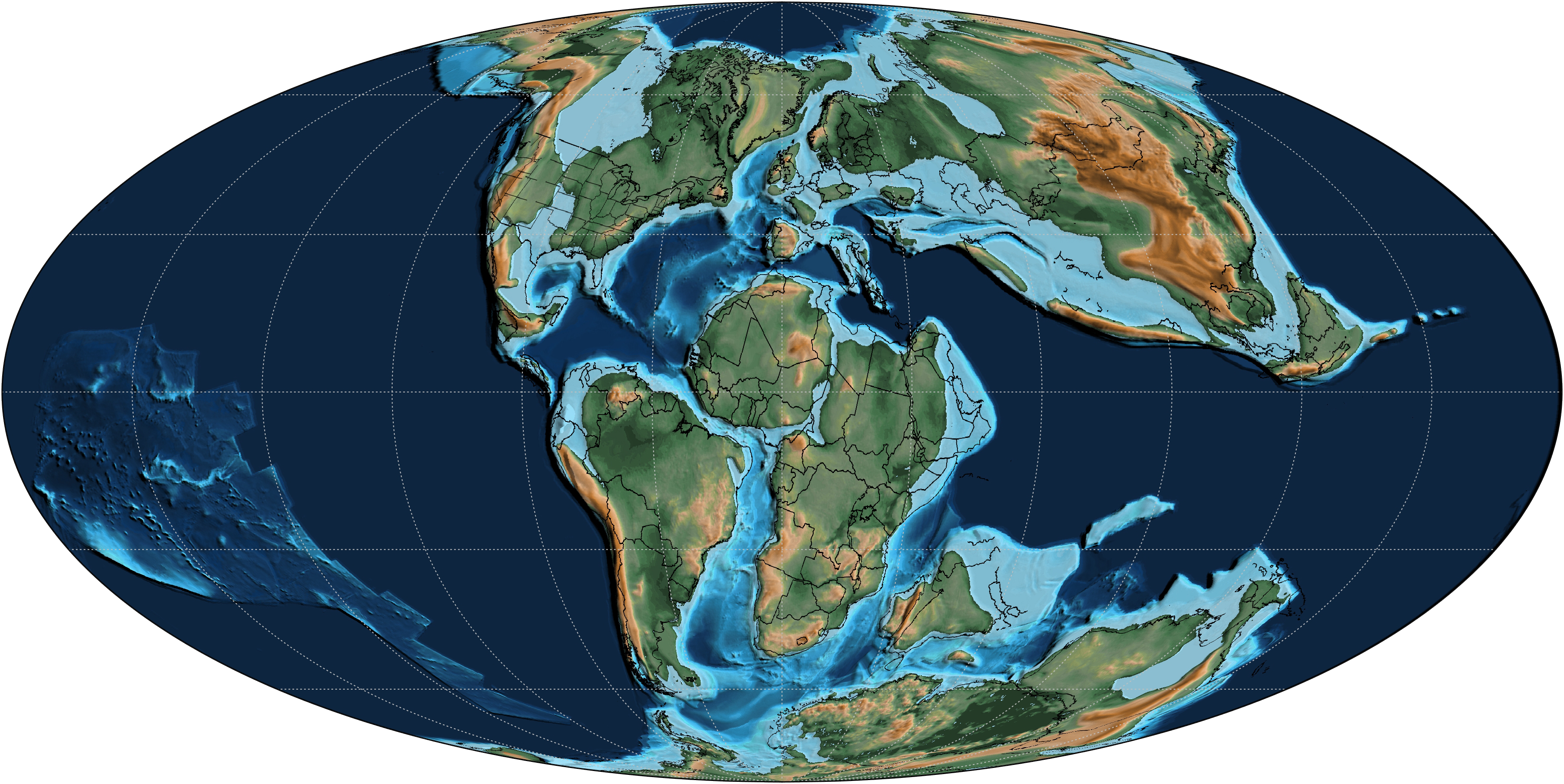
A map of Earth during the Albian with modern borders superimposed

Early Cretaceous terrestrial vertebrates are poorly known globally. The discovery of Arundelconodon represented the first recorded Early Cretaceous mammal from the Eastern Seaboard of the United States. Its discovery supports the idea that the terrestrial fauna of North America remained consistent throughout the Early Cretaceous, as it demonstrates no affinities with European or Gondwanan groups. The Arundel Clay, where it was first found, was dated to the Aptian age in its original description, but later authors have labelled the formation as more likely early Albian. Other known vertebrates include hybodonts, crocodylomorphs, bony fish, dinosaurs, turtles, and another genus of mammal (Argillomys). Aside from the hybodonts, which were likely tolerant of saltwater and consequently widely distributed, all taxa identified at the species level and several genera (including Arundelconodon) are endemic to the site. The deposits belong to the Potomac Group. The area has been interpreted as either a fringe swamp or, more recently, a floodplain where fossils were preserved in the mud of isolated channels and oxbow lakes. The presence of remains of various groups associated with coastal environments and the absence of lissamphibians, which are generally not saltwater tolerant, have been interpreted as indicative of a near-coastal environment.

== See also ==
- List of the Mesozoic life of Maryland
