= Arundel Formation =

Geological formation in Maryland

Coordinates: 39°3′N 76°38′W

- Stratigraphic range: late Aptian or early Albian
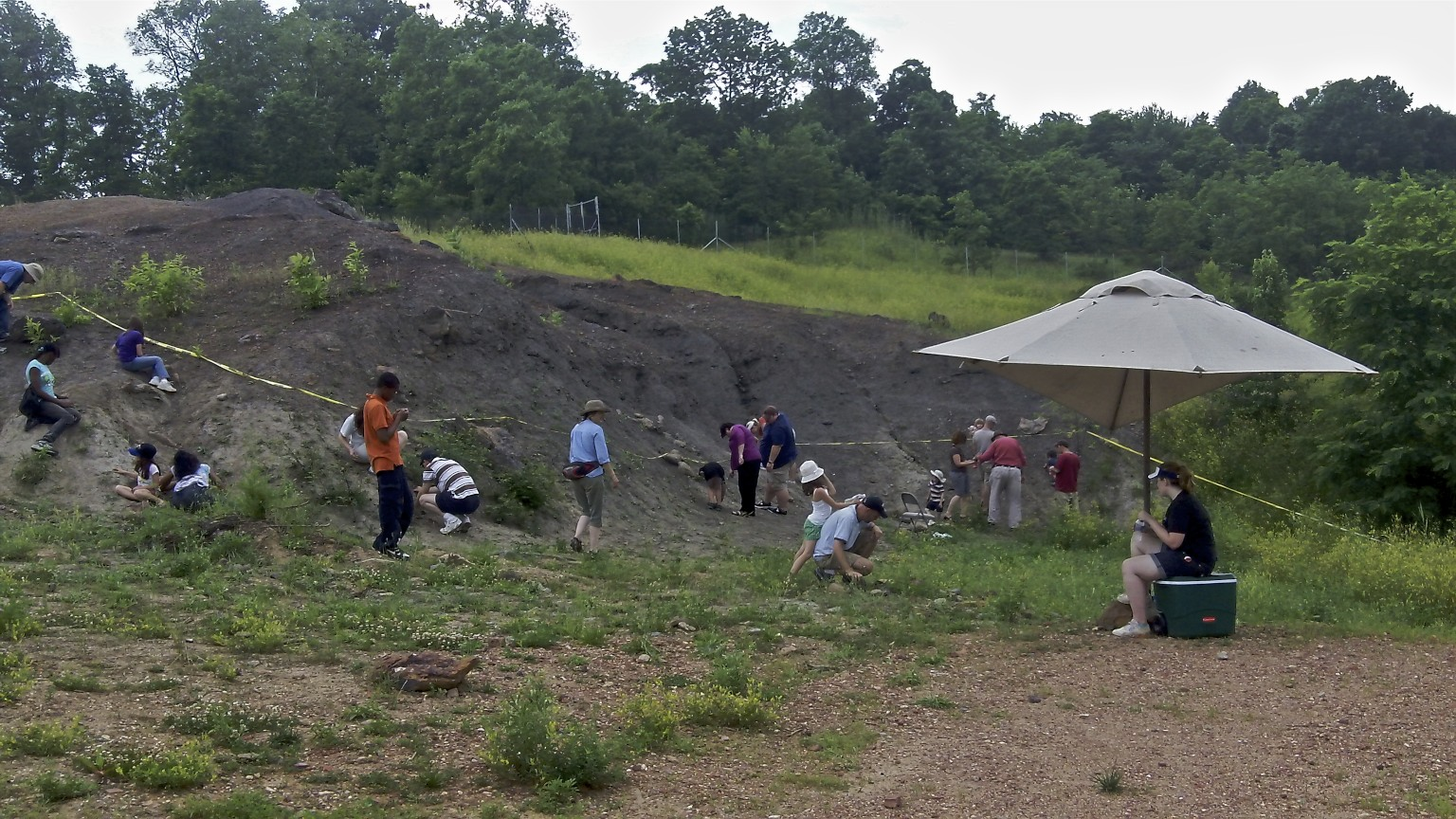
- Outdoor excavation on an exposed portion of the Arundel clays at Dinosaur Park at Laurel, Maryland, USA
- Type: Geological Formation
- Unit of: Potomac Group
- Underlies: Patapsco Formation (Unconformity)
- Overlies: Patuxent Formation
- Thickness: up to 125 feet (40 m)

Lithology
- Primary: Claystone, mudstone
- Other: Siderite nodules

Location
- Region: Maryland, Washington D. C.
- Country: United States

Type section
- Named for: Anne Arundel County, Maryland
- Named by: W. B. Clark, 1897

The Arundel Formation, also known as the Arundel Clay, is a clay-rich sedimentary rock formation, within the Potomac Group, found in Maryland of the United States of America. It dates to the Early Cretaceous, and is of late Aptian or (more likely) early Albian age. This rock unit had been economically important as a source of iron ore, but is now more notable for its dinosaur fossils. It is named for Anne Arundel County, Maryland.

It consists of clay lenses within depressions in the upper part of the Patuxent Formation that may represent oxbow swamp facies. The Arundel Formation contains a high number of terrestrial fauna, indicating that it was deposited in a freshwater fluvial environment, likely representing slow-moving river channels and oxbows. The Arundel Formation is the only major source for Early Cretaceous terrestrial vertebrates in eastern North America, and provides the best record of the dinosaurs that inhabited the region at the time.

== Vertebrate paleofauna ==
Dinosaurs present include the large theropod Acrocanthosaurus, the giant sauropod Astrodon, the possible ornithischian Magulodon, the poorly known theropods "Allosaurus" medius, "Dryptosaurus?" potens, and "Coelurus" gracilis, the ornithomimosaurian "Dryosaurus" grandis, as well as another indeterminate ornithomimosaurian (though it most likely is Nedcolbertia), the nodosaurid Priconodon, a possible basal ceratopsian, and potentially the ornithopod Tenontosaurus. Other vertebrates are not as well known from the formation, but include a freshwater shark, a lungfish, at least three genera of turtles, and several crocodilians.

The dinosaurian fauna of the Arundel Formation is very similar to that found in the concurrent, more comprehensive geological formations from further west (i.e. the Antlers, Cloverly, and Cedar Mountain Formations). This supports the idea of a largely homogenous dinosaur fauna stretching across North America during the Early Cretaceous, until the formation of the Western Interior Seaway divided the continent and led to major faunal changes on both halves. In contrast, among other vertebrate taxa, there are major differences between the Arundel and these western formations; in the Arundel, crocodylomorph and shark remains are far more common than those of bony fishes, whereas the opposite is true for the western formations. This may owe to differing environmental conditions on the Atlantic coast compared to the North American interior.

=== Cartilaginous fish ===
Cartilaginous fish reported from the Arundel Formation
Genus	Species	Location	Stratigraphic position	Material	Notes	Images
Egertonodus	E. basanus	Maryland		Teeth, spine	A hybodont shark.	
Planohybodus	P. ensis	Maryland		Teeth	A hybodont shark, formerly placed in Hybodus.	

=== Ray-finned fish ===
Ray-finned fish reported from the Arundel Formation
Genus	Species	Location	Stratigraphic position	Material	Notes	Images
cf. Lepidotes		Maryland		Teeth, jaw	A semionotid.	
cf. Vidalamiinae		Maryland		Teeth	An amiid.	

=== Lobe-finned fish ===
Lobe-finned fish reported from the Arundel Formation
Genus	Species	Location	Stratigraphic position	Material	Notes	Images
Ceratodus	C. kranzi	Maryland		Tooth plate	A ceratodontid lungfish.	

=== Reptiles ===
==== Dinosaurs ====
Color key: Taxon / Reclassified taxon / Taxon falsely reported as present / Dubious taxon or junior synonym / Ichnotaxon / Ootaxon / Morphotaxon

Notes
Uncertain or tentative taxa are in small text
~~crossed out~~ taxa are discredited.

Dinosaurs reported from the Arundel Formation
Genus	Species	Location	Stratigraphic position	Material	Notes	Images
Acrocanthosaurus	A. cf. atokensis	Maryland		"Teeth", "incomplete skeleton"	A large carcharodontosaurid theropod. Presence long suspected but uncertain, but confirmed in 2024 following the discovery of more complete remains.	Acrocanthosaurus
~~Allosaurus~~	"A." medius	Maryland		"Tooth."	An indeterminate theropod tooth.	Astrodon Deinonychus Tenontosaurus
Astrodon	A. johnstoni	Maryland; Washington D.C.		"Tooth."		Astrodon Deinonychus Tenontosaurus
"Capitalsaurus"	"C." potens	Washington D.C.		"Vertebra."	A neotheropod possibly synonymous with Acrocanthosaurus.	Astrodon Deinonychus Tenontosaurus
~~Coelurus~~	"C." gracilis			"Manual ungual and teeth."	A dromaeosaurid synonymous with Deinonychus.	Astrodon Deinonychus Tenontosaurus
~~Creosaurus~~	"C." potens				Reclassified as "Capitalsaurus" potens	Astrodon Deinonychus Tenontosaurus
cf. Deinonychus	Indeterminate	Maryland			A dromaeosaurid	Astrodon Deinonychus Tenontosaurus
~~Dryosaurus~~	"D." grandis	Maryland		"Limb elements."	An indeterminate member of Ornithomimosauria.	Astrodon Deinonychus Tenontosaurus
Magulodon	M. muirkirkensis	Maryland		"Tooth"	Likely an ornithischian, this genus is a nomen nudum that has not been formally published.	Astrodon Deinonychus Tenontosaurus
Neoceratopsia indet.	Indeterminate	Maryland		"Teeth"	An indeterminate member of Neoceratopsia. Initially believed to have belonged to an indeterminate member of Dryosauridae or the genus Tenontosaurus.	Astrodon Deinonychus Tenontosaurus
~~Ornithomimus~~	"O." affinis				Junior synonym of "Dryosaurus" grandis	Astrodon Deinonychus Tenontosaurus
Pleurocoelus	P. altus	Maryland		"Tibia [and] fibula."	A sauropod synonymous with Astrodon.	Astrodon Deinonychus Tenontosaurus
Pleurocoelus	P. nanus	Maryland			A sauropod synonymous with Astrodon.	Astrodon Deinonychus Tenontosaurus
Priconodon	P. crassus	Maryland		"Teeth, tibia."	A large nodosaurid.	Astrodon Deinonychus Tenontosaurus
cf. Richardoestesia	Indeterminate	Maryland		"Teeth"	A small theropod.	Astrodon Deinonychus Tenontosaurus
cf. Tenontosaurus	Indeterminate	Maryland				Astrodon Deinonychus Tenontosaurus

==== Pterosaurs ====
Unassigned pteradactyloid tracks.

Color key: Taxon / Reclassified taxon / Taxon falsely reported as present / Dubious taxon or junior synonym / Ichnotaxon / Ootaxon / Morphotaxon

Notes
Uncertain or tentative taxa are in small text
~~crossed out~~ taxa are discredited.

Pterosaurs of the Arundel Formation
Genus	Species	Location	Stratigraphic position	Abundance	Notes	Images
Pteraichnus						

==== Turtles ====
Turtles reported from the Arundel Formation
Genus	Species	Location	Stratigraphic position	Material	Notes	Images
Arundelemys	A. dardeni	Maryland		"A single, incomplete skull lacking the lower jaws and cheek region"	A baenid.	
Glyptops	G. caelatus	Maryland		"Carapace fragments probably pertaining to a single individual"	A pleurosternid.	
Naomichelys	N. sp.	Maryland		"Shell fragments"	A helochelydrid.	

==== Crocodylomorphs ====
Crocodylomorphs reported from the Arundel Formation
Genus	Species	Location	Stratigraphic position	Material	Notes	Images
cf. Bernissartiidae indet.	Indeterminate	Maryland		Tooth	A likely bernissartiid.	
cf. Goniopholididae indet.	Indeterminate	Maryland		Scutes, teeth	A likely goniopholidid, the most common crocodylomorph from the formation.	
cf. Pholidosauridae indet.	Indeterminate	Maryland		Teeth	A likely pholidosaurid.	

=== Mammals ===
Mammals reported from the Arundel Formation
Genus	Species	Location	Stratigraphic position	Material	Notes	Images
Argillomys	A. marylandensis	Maryland		Molar tooth	A multituberculate.	
Arundelconodon	A. hottoni	Maryland		Dentary with teeth	A triconodontid.	

== Other fossils ==
William Bullock Clark (1897) described lignitized trunks of trees often found in upright positions with their roots still intact.

G. J. Brenner (1963) described spores and pollen within the formation.

== See also ==
- List of dinosaur-bearing rock formations
