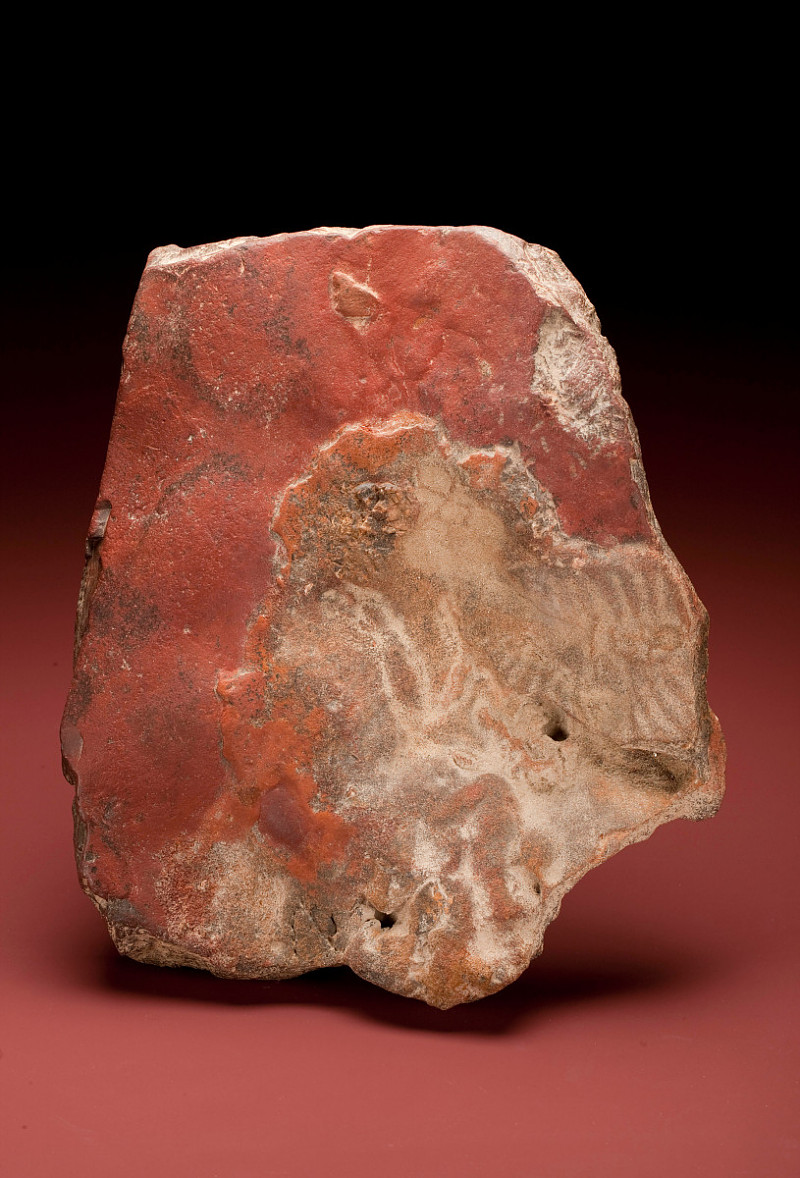
- Holotype specimen of P. marylandicus

Scientific classification
- Domain: Eukaryota
- Kingdom: Animalia
- Phylum: Chordata
- Clade: Dinosauria
- Clade: †Ornithischia
- Clade: †Thyreophora
- Clade: †Ankylosauria
- Clade: †Euankylosauria
- Family: †Nodosauridae
- Genus: †Propanoplosaurus; Stanford, Weishampel, & DeLeon 2011
- Species: †P. marylandicus

Binomial name
- †Propanoplosaurus marylandicus Stanford, Weishampel, & DeLeon 2011

= Propanoplosaurus =

Propanoplosaurus Temporal range: Early Cretaceous, 115 Ma

Extinct genus of dinosaurs

Propanoplosaurus is a genus of herbivorous nodosaurid dinosaur from the Early Cretaceous Patuxent Formation of Maryland, USA. Its type specimen is a natural cast and partial natural mold of a hatchling.

== Discovery and naming ==
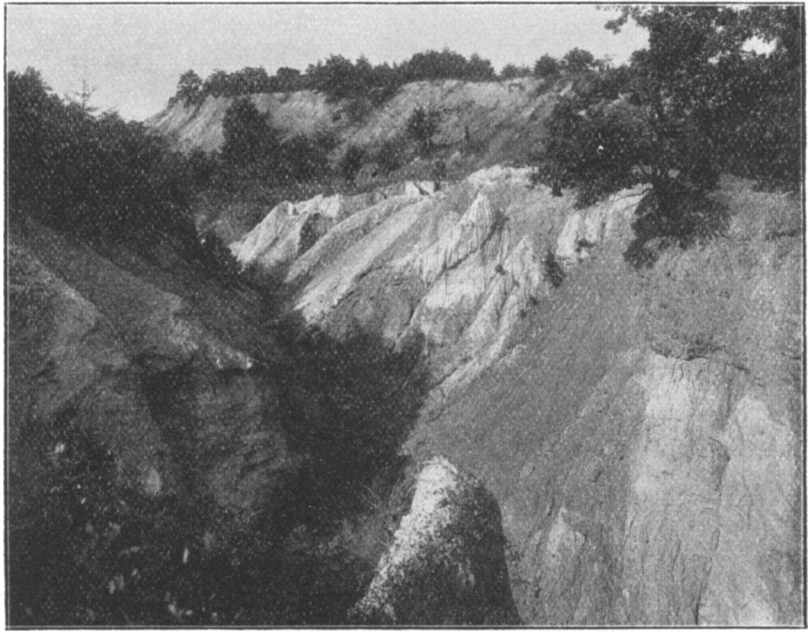
The Patuxent Formation in Maryland, where the holotype of P. marylandicus was discovered in 1997

From 1994 on, Ray Stanford uncovered an ichnofauna in Maryland near the border with Washington D.C. Along with dinosaur footprints, the impressions of a neonate nodosaurid, specimen USNM 540686, were found by Stanford in 1997.

The type species, Propanoplosaurus marylandicus was named and described by Stanford, David Weishampel, and Valerie DeLeon in 2011. The generic name combines the Latin prefix pro~ with the name of the genus Panoplosaurus because the new species lived earlier than — but resembled much — this already described nodosaurid. The specific name refers to Maryland.

The holotype, USNM 540686, was found in the Patuxent Formation, dating from the late Aptian. It consists of the impressions of the back of the head together with a natural cast of the ribcage, some vertebrae, the right forelimb, the right femur, and a right foot. The animal is shown lying on its back. The authors rejected the possibility that the specimen represented a pseudofossil or an embryo. The specimen is the first nodosaurid skeleton from the eastern seaboard, from which previously only nodosaurid teeth named Priconodon were known, and the first neonate dinosaur from that region.

== Description ==
The specimen has a preserved length of thirteen centimetres. The total length of the individual was estimated at between twenty-four and twenty-eight centimetres. Only the skull shows osteoderms, and the authors suggest this was a common developmental stage of all nodosaurids, together with a long middle section of the snout, which is characterised by a unique cross-pattern of the bone plates, probably formed by the triangular osteoderms of the maxillae. it is a nodosaur.

== Classification ==
Propanoplosaurus was by the describers assigned to the Nodosauridae.

== See also ==
- Timeline of ankylosaur research
