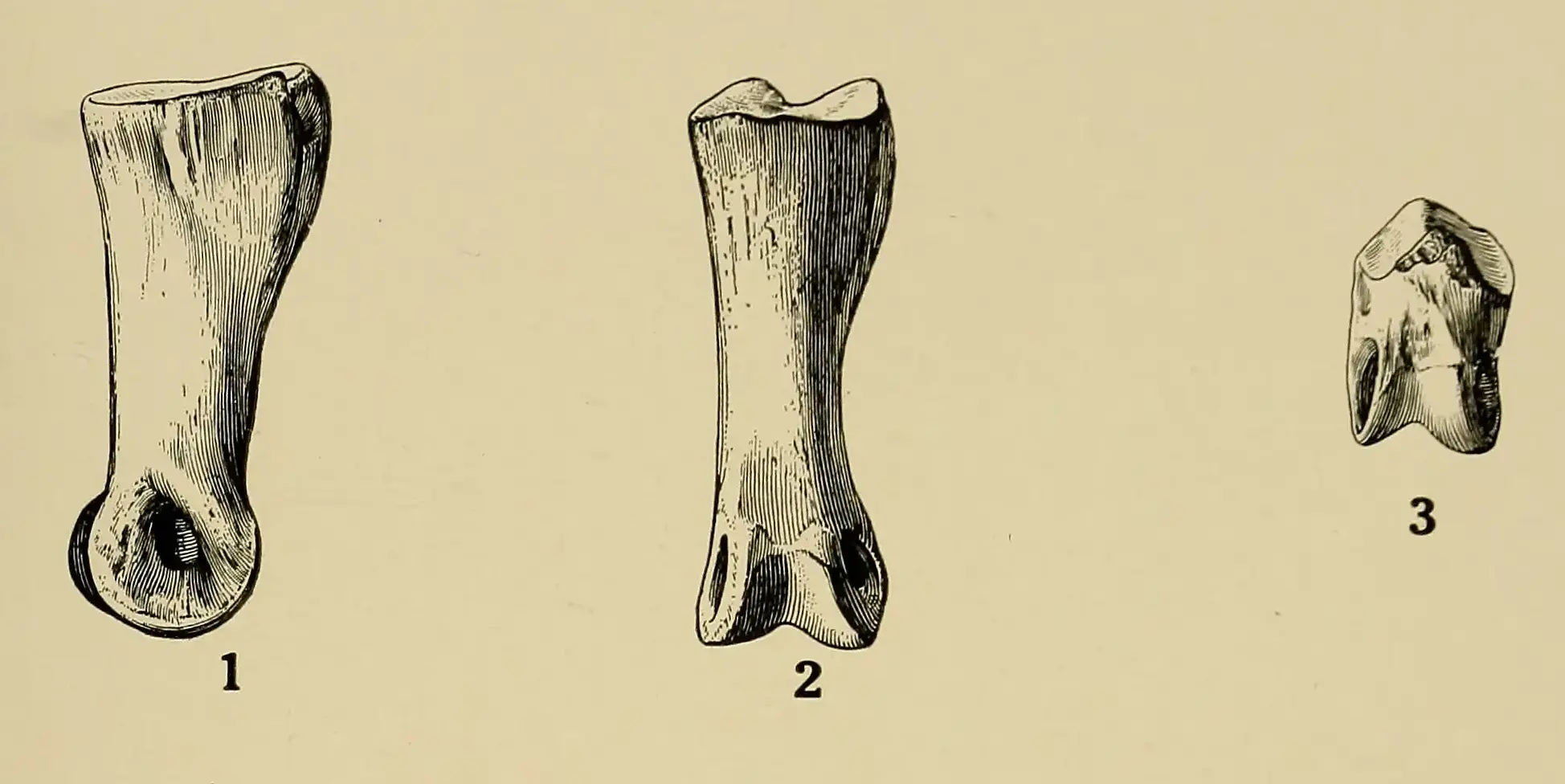
- Phalanx of D. grandis

Scientific classification
- Kingdom: Animalia
- Phylum: Chordata
- Class: Reptilia
- Clade: Dinosauria
- Clade: Saurischia
- Clade: Theropoda
- Clade: †Ornithomimosauria
- Genus: †"Dryosaurus"
- Species: †"D." grandis

Binomial name
- †"Dryosaurus" grandis Lull, 1911

Synonyms
- †Ornithomimus affinis Gilmore, 1920; †Coelosaurus affinis (Gilmore, 1920)

= "Dryosaurus" grandis =

"Dryosaurus" grandis Temporal range: Early Cretaceous, 112 Ma

Extinct species of dinosaur

"Dryosaurus" grandis is a dubious species of ornithomimosaur dinosaur known from remains found in the Arundel Formation of Maryland.

== Taxonomy ==
Richard Swann Lull erected the species Dryosaurus grandis for foot elements from the Arundel Formation, including a phalanx and astragalus that had been previously assigned to "Allosaurus" medius by Marsh, 1888. Due to Gilmore's 1920 classification of Dryosaurus grandis as a member of the genus Ornithomimus, Marsh's 1890 name Ornithomimus grandis became secondarily preoccupied with Lull's term, necessitating the use of Ornithomimus affinis as a substitute. However, the holotype specimen of Ornithomimus grandis comes from the Eagle Sandstone of Montana and is presumed lost, rendering Gilmore's action unnecessary. Matthew and Brown (1922) assigned the species to Coelosaurus, as C. affinis.

In his 1972 review of North American ornithomimosaurs, Russell (1972) noticed that "Dryosaurus" grandis was similar to the Asian Archaeornithomimus in having curved pedal unguals, so referred to it as Archaeornithomimus affinis. Smith and Galton (1990), however, claimed that the Arundel taxon could not be assigned beyond the level of Theropoda. A 2016 paper by Chase Brownstein, however, confirmed Gilmore's assignment of "Dryosaurus" grandis to Ornithomimosauria, noting that the Arundel material is similar to Kinnareemimus and Nedcolbertia in the characteristics of the feet.
