= Potomac Group =

Geologic group in Delaware, Maryland, New Jersey, and Virginia

- Stratigraphic range: Cretaceous, Aptian–Turonian
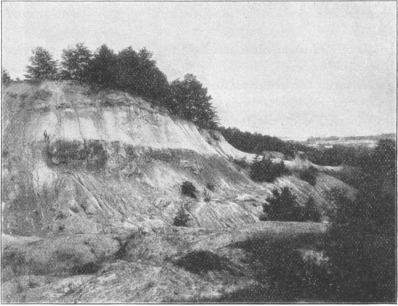
- View of Timber Neck showing the Arundel, Patapsco and Raritan Formations of the Potomac Group
- Type: Group
- Sub-units: Patuxent Formation, Arundel Formation, Patapsco Formation, Raritan Formation
- Underlies: Raritan Formation, Magothy Formation
- Overlies: Boonton Formation

Location
- Region: Delaware, Maryland, New Jersey, Virginia
- Country: United States

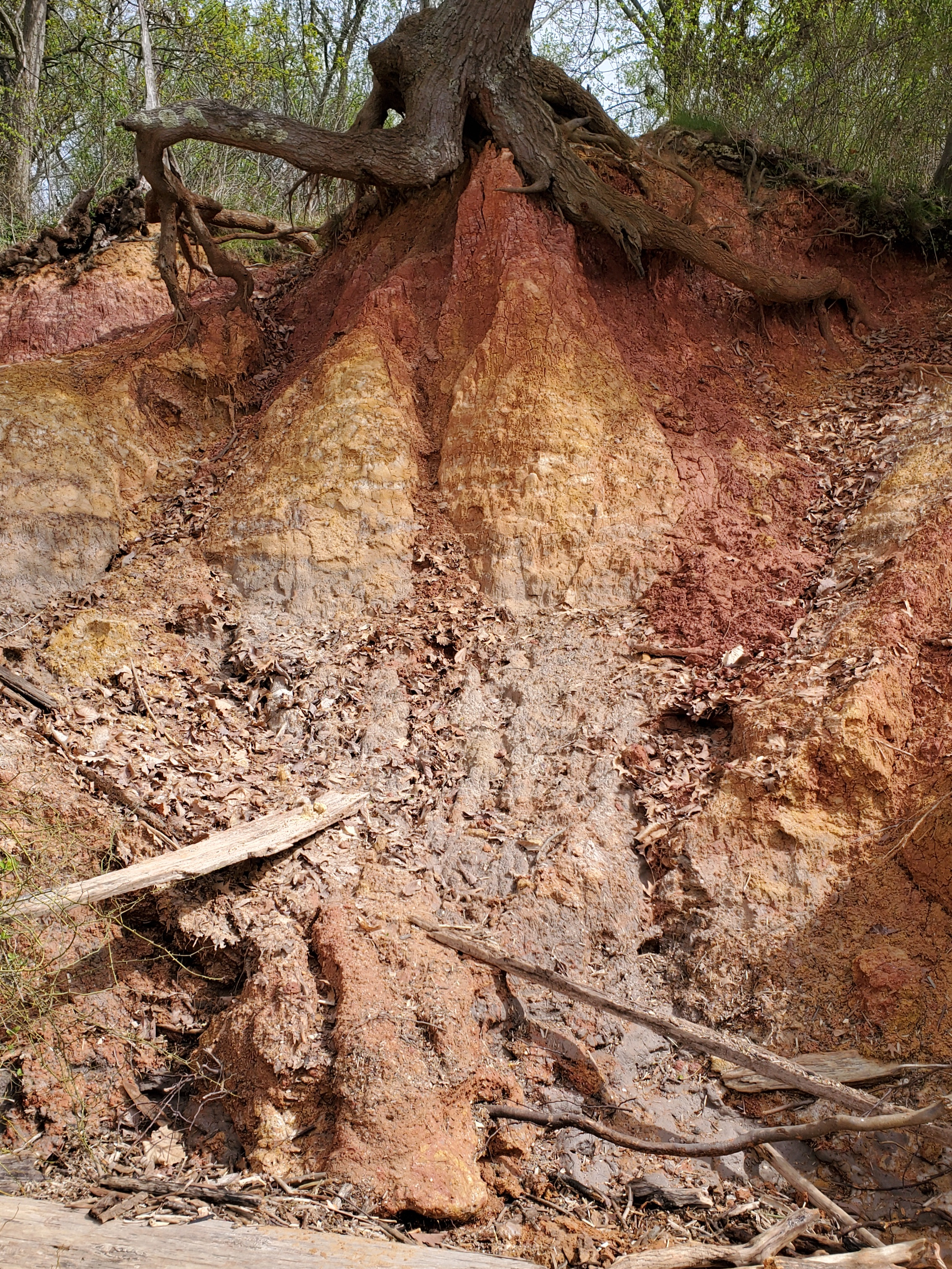
Exposure of part of the Potomac Group at Elk Neck State Park, Maryland

The Potomac Group is a geologic group in Delaware, Maryland, New Jersey, and Virginia. It preserves fossils dating back to the Cretaceous period. An indeterminate tyrannosauroid and Priconodon crassus, a nodosaurid, are known from indeterminate sediments belonging to the Potomac Group. The Potomac Group was initially believed to have been Late Jurassic in age by Othniel Charles Marsh but later studies, such as Clark (1897), have found that the Potomac Group is in fact Early-Late Cretaceous (Aptian-Turonian) in age. The most famous member of the group is the Arundel Formation, which preserves a high diversity of terrestrial vertebrate fauna and provides the most comprehensive look at the dinosaurian fauna of eastern North America during the Early Cretaceous.

== See also ==
- List of fossiliferous stratigraphic units in Virginia
- Paleontology in Virginia
