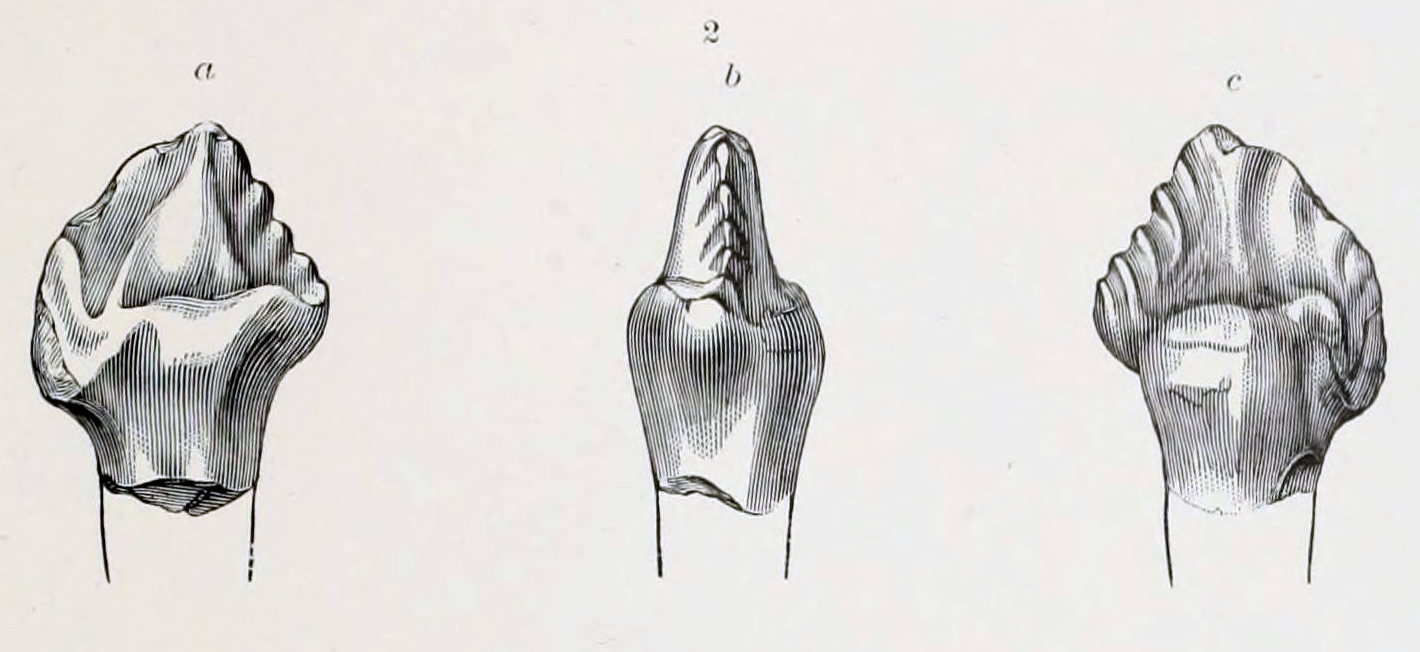
- Priconodon tooth in multiple views

Scientific classification
- Kingdom: Animalia
- Phylum: Chordata
- Class: Reptilia
- Clade: Dinosauria
- Clade: †Ornithischia
- Clade: †Thyreophora
- Clade: †Ankylosauria
- Family: †Nodosauridae
- Genus: †Priconodon
- Species: †P. crassus

Binomial name
- †Priconodon crassus Marsh, 1888

= Priconodon =

Priconodon Temporal range: Early Cretaceous, 113 Ma

Extinct genus of dinosaurs

Priconodon (meaning "saw cone tooth") is an extinct genus of nodosaurid ankylosaurian dinosaur, mainly known from its large teeth. Its remains have been found in the Early Cretaceous (Aptian-Albian age) Arundel Formation of Muirkirk, Prince George's County, Maryland, USA, and possibly the Potomac Group, also located in Maryland. As an ankylosaur, Priconodon would have been a large armored quadrupedal herbivore, though no size estimation has been done due to the scarcity of described remains.

== History of discovery ==
A tibia (shin bone) assigned to Priconodon

O. C. Marsh named the genus for USNM 2135, a large worn tooth from what was then called the Potomac Formation. As ankylosaurians were by and large unknown at the time, he compared it to Diracodon (=Stegosaurus) teeth. It was not identified as an ankylosaurian until Walter Coombs assigned it to Nodosauridae in 1978.

In 1998 Kenneth Carpenter and James Kirkland, in a review of North American Lower Cretaceous ankylosaurs, considered it tentatively valid as an unusually large nodosaurid, larger than all those described before. Carpenter (2001) retained it as a valid nodosaurid, but did not employ it in his phylogenetic analysis. Vickaryous et al. (2004), in a review of armored dinosaurs, considered it to be dubious without comment. In 2026, Emily Cross and colleagues used morphometric analyses to identify Priconodon as a nodosaurid based on large tooth crown base lengths and crown heights.

=== Additional specimens ===
Carpenter and Kirkland (1998) listed 12 additional teeth from the same area as the holotype tooth, and tentatively added a robust tibia (USNM 9154) to the genus. They found the lack of armor found in the Arundel to be peculiar, but noted that fossils are rare in that formation anyway. In 2018, three new ankylosaur teeth described from the Potomac Formation were assigned to Priconodon crassus based on their similarity to the holotype.

== See also ==
- Timeline of ankylosaur research
