= Argillomys =

Argillomys Temporal range: Aptian

Scientific classification
- Kingdom: Animalia
- Phylum: Chordata
- Class: Mammalia
- Order: †Multituberculata
- Genus: †Argillomys
- Species: †A. marylandensis

Binomial name
- †Argillomys marylandensis Cifelli et al., 2013

Extinct genus of multituberculate

Argillomys is an extinct genus of multituberculate mammal that lived in Maryland during the Aptian stage of the Early Cretaceous epoch.

== Description ==
Argillomys marylandensis, the type and only species, is distinguished by its unique combination of morphological traits on its second molar that include a tooth enamel ornamentation consisting of ribs and grooves only, a cusp formula of 2:4, the presence of a distinct cusp on the anterobuccal ridge, the enlargement of the second cusp of the buccal row, and central position of ultimate cusp in the lingual row.
