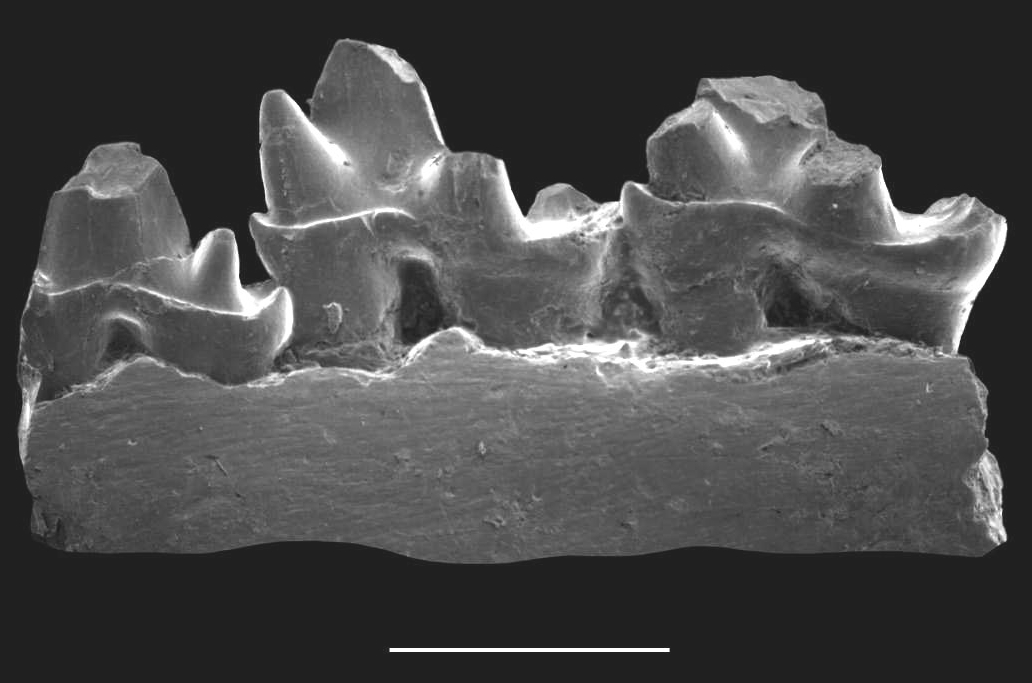
- Ambondro mahabo jaw fragment
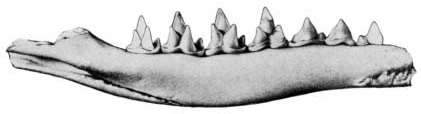
- Shuotherium dongi jawbone

Scientific classification
- Kingdom: Animalia
- Phylum: Chordata
- Class: Mammalia
- Subclass: Yinotheria; Chow and Rich, 1982

Subgroups
- †Shuotheriidae; Australosphenida; Monotremata

= Yinotheria =

Yinotheria Temporal range: Middle Jurassic–Holocene (possible Late Triassic record)

Subclass of mammals

Yinotheria is a proposed basal subclass clade of crown mammals uniting the Shuotheriidae, an extinct group of mammals from the Jurassic of Eurasia, with Australosphenida, a group of mammals known from the Jurassic to Cretaceous of Gondwana, which possibly include living monotremes. Today, there are only five surviving species of monotremes which live in Australia and New Guinea, consisting of the platypus and four species of echidna. Fossils of yinotheres have been found in Britain, China, Russia, Madagascar and Argentina. Contrary to other known crown mammals, they retained postdentary bones as shown by the presence of a postdentary trough. The extant members (monotremes) developed the mammalian middle ear independently.

Other studies have rejected Yinotheria, finding Shuotheriidae to be unrelated to Australosphenida and outside crown Mammalia.

== Evolutionary history ==
According to genetic studies, Yinotheria diverged from other mammals around 220 to 210 million years ago, at some point in the Triassic or Early Jurassic. The oldest-known fossils are a bit younger, dating around 168 to 163 million years in the Middle Jurassic. These fossils are the genera Pseudotribos of China, Shuotherium of both China and the United Kingdom, Itatodon of Siberia and Paritatodon of Kyrgyzstan and the UK. These, which belong to the family Shuotheriidae, are the only known northern hemisphere group of yinotherians.

The infraclass Australosphenida appeared around the same time as Shuotheriidae. The family Henosferidae, comprising the genera Henosferus, Ambondro, and Asfaltomylos, has been found in the southern hemisphere at locations in Argentina and Madagascar. This suggests that this family could have been more widespread and diverse in Gondwana during that time; however, due to their fragile state, some fossils might have been destroyed by geological events.

The family Ausktribosphenidae and the first monotremes appeared in the Early Cretaceous, in the region that is now known as Australasia. Despite being found in the same region of the world and in the same time period, recent work has found that the older Henosferidae is the sister taxon to Monotremata, with Ausktribosphenidae being the next sister taxa in Australosphenida. Ausktribosphenidae includes the genera Bishops and Ausktribosphenos.

Some 110-million-year-old monotreme fossil jaw fragments were found at Lightning Ridge, New South Wales. These fragments, from the species Steropodon galmani, are the oldest known monotreme fossils. Fossils from the genera Kollikodon, Teinolophos, and Obdurodon have also been discovered. In 1991, a fossil tooth of a 61-million-year-old platypus was found in southern Argentina (since named Monotrematum, though it is now considered to be an Obdurodon species). (See fossil monotremes below.) Molecular clock and fossil dating give a wide range of dates for the split between echidnas and platypuses, with one survey putting the split at 19 to 48 million years ago, but another putting it at 17 to 89 million years ago. All these dates are more recent than the oldest known platypus fossils, suggesting that both the short-beaked and long-beaked echidna species are derived from a platypus-like ancestor.

== Systematics ==
=== History of classification ===
==== Prototheria ====
Originally, monotremes were classified as a subclass of mammals known as Prototheria. The names Prototheria, Metatheria and Eutheria (meaning "first beasts", "changed beasts", and "true beasts", respectively) refer to the three mammalian groupings that have living representatives. Each of the three may be defined as a total clade containing a living crown-group (respectively, the Monotremata, Marsupialia and Placentalia) plus any fossil species that are more closely related to that crown-group than to any other living animals.

The threefold division of living mammals into monotremes, marsupials and placentals was already well established when Thomas Huxley proposed the names Metatheria and Eutheria to incorporate the two latter groups in 1880. Initially treated as subclasses, Metatheria and Eutheria are by convention now grouped as infraclasses of the subclass Theria, and in more recent proposals have been demoted further (to cohorts or even magnorders), as cladistic reappraisals of the relationships between living and fossil mammals have suggested that the Theria itself should be reduced in rank.

Prototheria, on the other hand, was generally recognised as a subclass until quite recently, on the basis of a hypothesis that defined the group by two supposed synapomorphies: (1) formation of the side wall of the braincase from a bone called the anterior lamina, contrasting with the alisphenoid in therians; and (2) a linear alignment of molar cusps, contrasting with a triangular arrangement in therians. These characters appeared to unite monotremes with a range of Mesozoic fossil orders (Morganucodonta, Triconodonta, Docodonta and Multituberculata) in a broader clade for which the name Prototheria was retained, and of which monotremes were thought to be only the last surviving branch (Benton 2005: 300, 306).

==== Australosphenida hypothesis and Yinotheria ====
The evidence that was held to support Prototheria is now universally discounted. In the first place, the examination of embryos has revealed that the development of the braincase wall is essentially identical in therians and in 'prototherians': the anterior lamina simply fuses with the alisphenoid in therians, and therefore the 'prototherian' condition of the braincase wall is primitive for all mammals, while the therian condition can be derived from it. Additionally, the linear alignment of molar cusps is also primitive for all mammals. Therefore, neither of these states can supply a uniquely shared derived character that would support a 'prototherian' grouping of orders in contradistinction to Theria (Kemp 1983).

In a further reappraisal, the molars of embryonic and fossil monotremes (living monotreme adults are toothless) appear to demonstrate an ancestral pattern of cusps that is similar to the triangular arrangement observed in therians. Some peculiarities of this dentition support an alternative grouping of monotremes with certain recently discovered fossil forms into a proposed new clade known as the Australosphenida, and also suggest that the triangular array of cusps may have evolved independently in australosphenidans and therians (Luo et al. 2001, 2002). Australosphenida is characterized by the shared presence of a cingulum on the outer front corner of the lower molars, a short and broad talonid, a relatively low trigonid, and a triangulated last lower premolar.

The Australosphenida hypothesis remains controversial; for example, lingual cingula seem to be a presence in various non-australosphenidan mammals and some work has shown the possibility of Eutheria being the sister group to Australosphenida, without monotremes. As a result, some taxonomists (e.g. McKenna & Bell 1997) prefer to maintain the name Prototheria as a fitting contrast to the other group of living mammals, the Theria. In theory, the Prototheria is taxonomically redundant, since Monotremata is currently the only order that can still be confidently included, but its retention might be justified if new fossil evidence, or a re-examination of known fossils, enables extinct relatives of the monotremes to be identified and placed within a wider grouping.

When systematic work was performed, it was also found that Australosphenida is the sister taxon to Shuotheriidae, an obscure group of Mesozoic mammals that were found in what is now China. Kielan-Jaworowska, Cifelli & Luo 2002 had this to say regarding the Shuotheriidae, particularly Shuotherium:

In our view, the most compelling evidence as to the affinities of Shuotherium lies in the structure of the last premolar, which shares striking similarities to that of Australosphenida

Lower molar structure of Shuotherium and Australosphenida is obviously quite different, and for this reason we do not place Shuotherium within this Gondwanan clade. Based on the limited evidence available, however, we suggest that Shuotherium is a viable sister-taxon to Australosphenida.

Yinotheria is named for this grouping.

Other scholars have rejected Yinotheria, finding instead that Shuotheriidae is closely related to Docodonta outside crown Mammalia.

=== Taxonomy ===
In comparison to Metatheria and Eutheria, where there seems to be a better understanding on the relationships among taxa with substantial fossil evidence, Yinotheria has few fossils; mostly consisting of (with few exceptions) the jawbones and teeth. In addition, the group seems not to have been as diverse in their evolutionary history, in comparison to members of both Metatheria and Eutheria. Future analysis and better fossil remains could affect the membership of Yinotheria as well as rearranging and revising the relationships of stem-monotremes and crowned monotremes.

- Subclass Yinotheria Chow & Rich 1982 sensu Kielan-Jaworowska, Cifelli & Luo 2004 [Prototheria Gill 1872]
  - Order †Shuotherida Chow & Rich 1982 [Shuotheridia; Shuotheria]
    - Family †Shuotheriidae Chow & Rich 1982
      - Genus †Pseudotribos Luo, Ji & Yuan 2007
        - †Pseudotribos robustus Luo, Ji & Yuan 2007
      - Genus †Shuotherium Chow & Rich 1982
        - †Shuotherium dongi Chow & Rich 1982
        - †Shuotherium shilongi Wang et al. 1998
  - Infraclass Australosphenida Luo, Cifelli & Kielan-Jaworowska 2001 sensu Kielan-Jaworowska, Cifelli & Luo 2004
    - Order †Ausktribosphenida Luo, Cifelli & Kielan-Jaworowska 2001
      - Family †Ausktribosphenidae Rich et al. 1997
        - Genus †Bishops Rich et al. 2001
          - †Bishops whitmorei Rich et al. 2001
        - Genus †Ausktribosphenos Rich et al. 1997
          - †Ausktribosphenos nyktos Rich et al. 1997
    - Order †Henosferida Averianov & Lopatin 2011
      - Family †Henosferidae Rougier et al. 2007
        - Genus †Ambondro
          - †Ambondro mahabo Flynn et al. 1999
        - Genus †Asfaltomylos Rauhut et al. 2002
          - †Asfaltomylos patagonicus Rauhut et al. 2002
        - Genus †Henosferus Rougier et al. 2007
          - †Henosferus molus Rougier et al. 2007
    - Order Monotremata Bonaparte 1837 sensu Luo, Cifelli & Kielan-Jaworowska 2001
      - Family Incertae sedis
        - Genus †Kryoryctes Pridmore et al. 2005 (either a stem-monotreme or junior synonym of Steropodon)
          - †Kryoryctes cadburyi Pridmore et al. 2005
      - Family Tachyglossidae Gill 1872 [ Echidnidae Burnett 1830] (echidnas, spiny anteaters)
        - Genus †Megalibgwilia Griffiths, Wells & Barrie 1991 (subjective synonym or subgenus of Zaglossus)
          - †Megalibgwilia robusta (Dun 1895) (subjective synonym of Zaglossus robustus)
          - †Megalibgwilia ramsayi (Owen 1884) (senior synonym of Megalibgwilia owenii)
        - Genus Zaglossus Gill 1877 [Proechidna Gervais 1877; Acanthoglossus Gervais 1877; Bruynia Dubois 1882; Bruijia Thomas 1883; Prozaglossus Kerbert 1913] (Long-beaked Echidnas)
          - †Murrayglossus Glauert 1914 (Hackett's Giant Echidna) (might belong to a new genus)
          - Zaglossus bruijni (Peters & Doria 1876) (Western Long-beaked/Bruinj's/Brown False Echidna)
          - Zaglossus attenboroughii Flannery & Groves 1998 (Attenborough's/Sir David's/Cyclops Long-beaked Echidna)
          - Zaglossus bartoni Thomas 1907 (Eastern/Barton's Long-beaked/Grey False Echidna)
        - Genus Tachyglossus Illiger 1811 [Acanthonotus Goldfuss 1809; Echidna Cuvier 1798; Echinopus Fischer de Waldheim 1814; Syphomia Rafinesque 1815]
          - Tachyglossus aculeatus (Shaw 1792) Illiger 1811 (short-beaked Echidna)
      - Family †Kollikodontidae Flannery et al. 1995
        - Genus †Kollikodon Flannery et al. 1995 (might be a mammaliform of uncertain placement)
          - †Kollikodon ritchiei Flannery et al. 1995
      - Family †Steropodontidae Archer et al. 1985
        - Genus †Teinolophos Rich et al. 1999 (might be a basal monotreme or a stem-monotreme)
          - †Teinolophos trusleri Rich et al. 1999
        - Genus †Steropodon Archer et al. 1985
          - †Steropodon galmani Archer et al. 1985
      - Family Ornithorhynchidae Gray 1825
        - Genus †Monotrematum Pascual et al. 1992 (here considered to be a basal ornithorhynchid; others subjective synonym of Obdurodon)
          - †Monotrematum sudamericanum Pascual et al. 1992
        - Genus †Obdurodon Woodburne & Tedford 1975
          - †Obdurodon insignis Woodburne & Tedford 1975
          - †Obdurodon tharalkooschild Pian, Archer & Hand 2013
          - †Obdurodon dicksoni Archer et al. 1992 (Riversleigh platypus)
        - Genus Ornithorhynchus Blumenbach 1800 [Dermipus Wiedermann 1800; Platypus Shaw 1799 non Herbst 1793]
          - Ornithorhynchus anatinus (Shaw 1799) Blumenbach 1800 (platypus)

=== Phylogeny ===
Below is a simplified tree on Averianov et al., 2014 after Woodburn, 2003 and Ashwell, 2013

- Yinotheria
  - †Shuotheriidae
    - †Pseudotribos
    - †Shuotherium
  - Australosphenida
    - †Ausktribosphenidae
      - †Bishops
      - †Ausktribosphenos
    - - †Henosferidae
        - †Henosferus
        - - †Ambondro
          - †Asfaltomylos
      - Monotremata
