= Paleobiota of the Cañadón Asfalto Formation =

Geological formation in Argentina

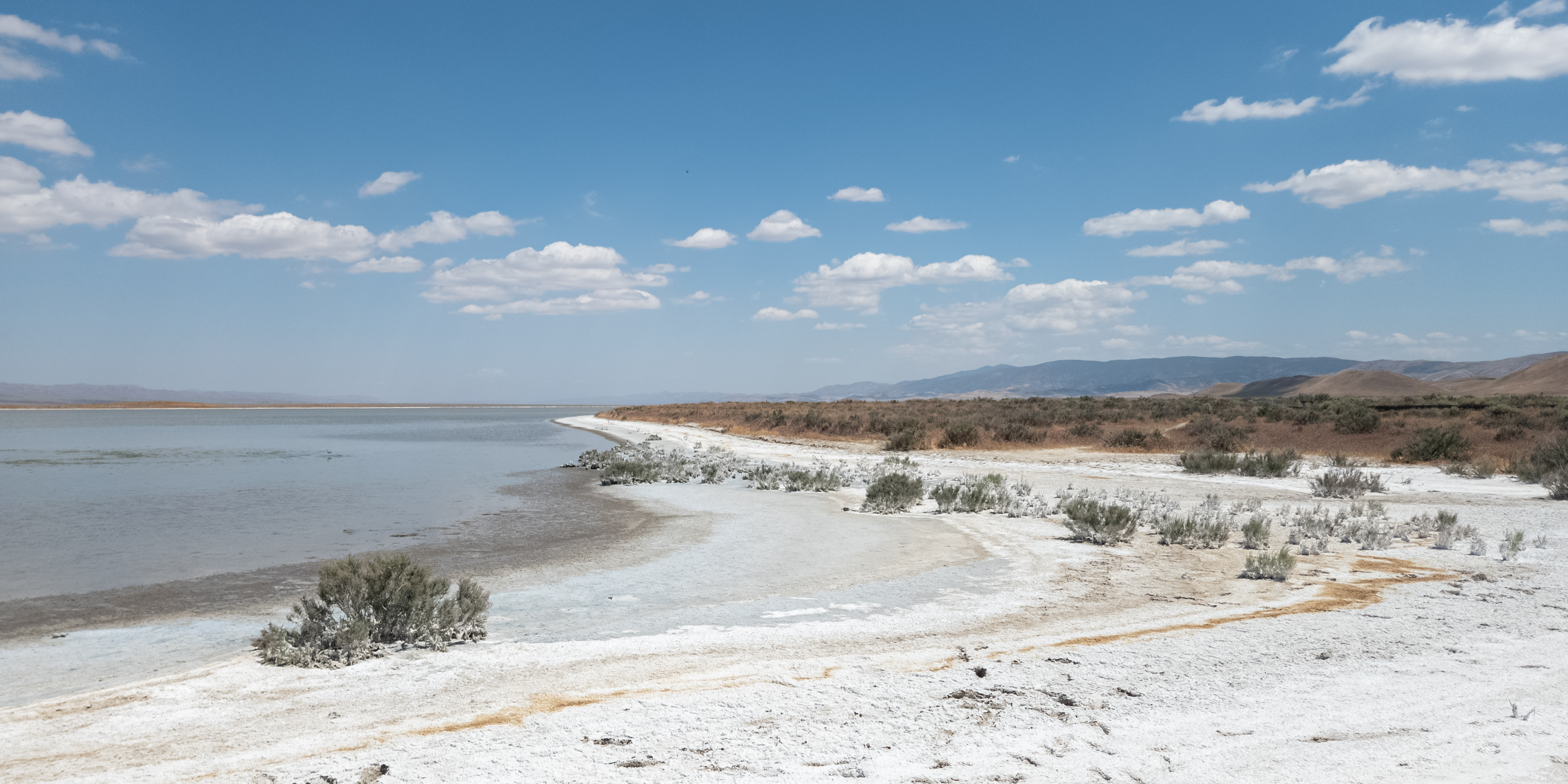
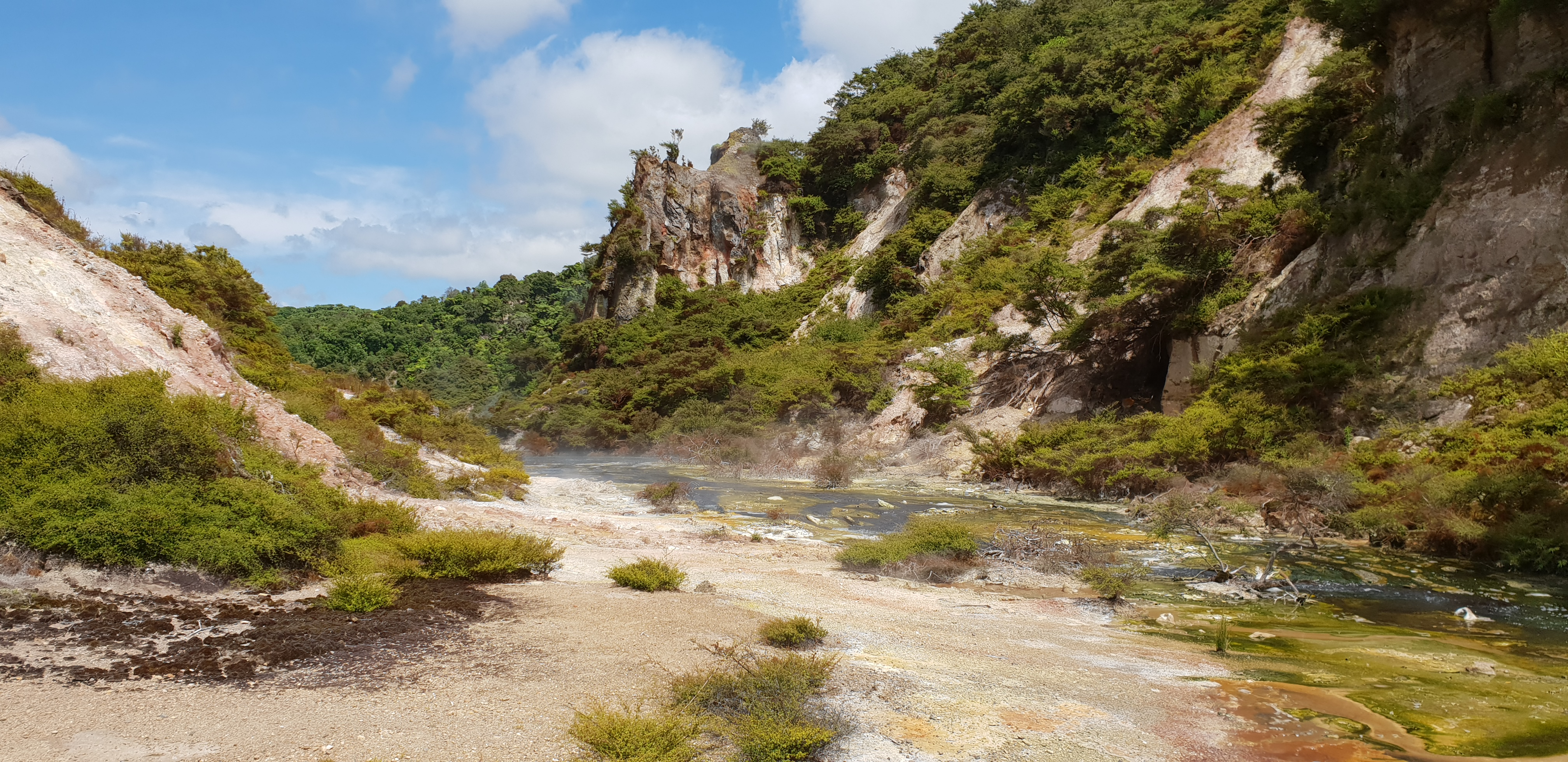
The Chacritas Member hosted volcanic-influenced soda lake (Example from modern California), while nearby environments hosted varied floral belts from coastal Cheirolepidaceous forests to highland Podocarps (Modern Equivalent from New Zealand), a rift area with nearby volcanic influence of the Chon Aike Province

The Cañadón Asfalto Formation is a geological formation which dates to the Toarcian age of the Early Jurassic period of Argentina. The rocks of the formation preserve a diverse biota, including plants, dinosaurs, invertebrates, mammals and pterosaurs, among others. The formation is divided into two members: the lower Las Chacritas Member, and the overlying Puesto Almada member, though the latter has also been assigned to the overlying Cañadón Calcáreo Formation by some authors. The members are typically composed of fluvial-lacustrine deposits consisting of sandstones and shales, with a limestone carbonate evaporitic sequence also being present in the lower of the two.

== Invertebrates ==
Color key: Taxon / Reclassified taxon / Taxon falsely reported as present / Dubious taxon or junior synonym / Ichnotaxon / Ootaxon / Morphotaxon

Notes
Uncertain or tentative taxa are in small text
~~crossed out~~ taxa are discredited.

=== Demospongiae ===
Genus	Species	Location	Stratigraphic position	Material	Notes	Images
Palaeospongilla	P. chubutensis	Estancia Fossati locality	Las Chacritas Member	Isolated Specimens	Palaeospongillidae freshwater sponge.	Example of the living genus Spongilla.

=== Mollusca ===
Genus	Species	Location	Stratigraphic position	Material	Notes	Images
Corbicula	C. spp.	Cerro Cóndor; Cerro Bayo; Estancia El Torito	Las Chacritas Member; Puesto Almada Member	Isolated Shells	Corbiculidae freshwater bivalve.	Extant example
Cyanocyclas	C. spp.	Cerro Cóndor; Cerro Bayo; Estancia El Torito	Las Chacritas Member; Puesto Almada Member	Isolated Shells	Corbiculidae freshwater bivalve.	
Diplodon	D. cf.matildensis; D. spp.	Cañadón Asfalto; Cerro Caracoles; Las Chacritas; Cañadón Lahuincó; Cañadón Miyanao; Cerro Cóndor; Cerro Bayo; Alice Creek; Quebrada Subsidiaria; Estancia El Torito	Las Chacritas Member; Puesto Almada Member	Isolated Shells	Unionidae freshwater bivalve. Represents also some of the smallest-sized specimens recorded in the Mesozoic.	Extant example
Nayadidae indet.	Indeterminate	Cañadón Asfalto; Cañadón Lahuincó	Las Chacritas Member	Isolated Shells	Incertade Sedis	
Palaeomutela	P. spp.	Las Chacritas	Las Chacritas Member	Isolated Shells	Palaeomutelidae freshwater bivalve.	
Potamolithus	P.? spp.	Cañadón Asfalto; Cerro Caracoles; Las Chacritas; Cañadón Lahuincó	Las Chacritas Member	Isolated Shells	Tateidae freshwater snail.	Extant example
Sphaeriidae indet.	Indeterminate	Cañadón Asfalto	Las Chacritas Member	Isolated Shells	Incertade Sedis	
Viviparus	V. spp.	Cañadón Asfalto; Cerro Caracoles; Cañadón Lahuincó; Cañadón Asfalto; Quebrada Subsidiaria; Estancia El Torito	Las Chacritas Member; Puesto Almada Member	Isolated Shells	Viviparidae freshwater snail.	Extant example

=== Branchiopoda/Oligostraca ===
Genus	Species	Location	Stratigraphic position	Material	Notes	Images
Carapacestheria	C. taschi	Cañadón Asfalto; Cañadón Lahuincó; Cerro Bayo	Las Chacritas Member; Puesto Almada Member	Isolated Valves	Eosestheriidae clam shrimp. Originally identified as Cyzicus (Euestheria) taschi.	
Congestheriella	C. rauhuti	Sierra de la Manea; Estancia El Torito; Cañadón Los Chivos	Puesto Almada Member	Isolated Valves	Afrograptidae clam shrimp. It may come from the Cañadón Calcáreo Formation.	
Darwinula	D. magna; D. spp.	Cañadón Asfalto; Cañadón Lahuincó; Cerro Bayo; Cañadón Asfalto; Quebrada Subsidiaria; Estancia el Torito	Las Chacritas Member; Puesto Almada Member	Isolated Valves	Darwinulidae Ostracod.	
Eosolimnadiopsis	E. spp.	Cerro Cóndor; Estancia Fossati	Las Chacritas Member	Isolated Valves	Palaeolimnadiopseidae clam shrimp.	
Euestheria	E. volkheimeri	Cerro Cóndor; Cerro Bayo; Alice Creek; Quebrada Subsidiaria	Las Chacritas Member; Puesto Almada Member	Isolated Valves	Euestheriidae clam shrimp.	
Lioestheria	C. (Lioestheria) sp. B; C. (Lioestheria) sp. C	Cañadón Las Chacritas; Colan Conhué; Alice Creek	Las Chacritas Member; Puesto Almada Member	Isolated Valves	A freshwater (Lacustrine) member of Fushunograptidae (Spinicaudatan).	
Mandelstamia	M.? spp.	Estancia El Torito	Puesto Almada Member	Isolated Valves	Limnocytheridae clam shrimp. It may come from the Cañadón Calcáreo Formation.	
Metacypris	M. sp.	Estancia El Torito	Puesto Almada Member	Isolated Valves	Loxoconchidae Ostracodan. It may come from the Cañadón Calcáreo Formation.	
Penthesilenula	P. magna; P. sarytirmenensis	Cañadón de la Angostura; Estancia El Torito	Las Chacritas Member; Puesto Almada Member	Isolated Valves	Darwinulidae Ostracodan.	
Pseudestherites	P. sp.	Estancia El Torito; Cañadón Los Chivos	Puesto Almada Member	Isolated Valves	Antronestheriidae clam shrimp. It may come from the Cañadón Calcáreo Formation.	
Theryosinoecum	T. barrancalensis minor	Estancia El Torito	Puesto Almada Member	Isolated Valves	Cytheroidea clam shrimp. It may come from the Cañadón Calcáreo Formation.	
Timiriasevia	T. sp.	Estancia El Torito	Puesto Almada Member	Isolated Valves	Limnocytheridae Ostracodan. It may come from the Cañadón Calcáreo Formation.	
Wolfestheria	W. patagoniensis; W. smekali	Cañadón Asfalto; Cañadón Lahuincó; Estancia La Sin Rumbo	Las Chacritas Member; Puesto Almada Member	Isolated Valves	Fushunograptidae clam shrimp.	

=== Insecta ===
Insect eggs of unknown affinity were reported from several layers of the Estancia Fossati locality.

Genus	Species	Location	Stratigraphic position	Material	Notes	Images
Chironomidae indet.	Indeterminate	Gan Gan	Puesto Almada Member	Head capsules	Incertade Sedis, it may come from the Cañadón Calcáreo Formation.	Extant member of the Family
Coleoptera indet.	Indeterminate	Cerro Cóndor; Estancia Fossati; Estancia El Torito; Estancia La Sin Rumbo	Las Chacritas Member; Puesto Almada Member	Elytra and body remains	Incertade Sedis	
Conchindusia	C. isp.	Cerro Cóndor; Gan Gan	Las Chacritas Member; Puesto Almada Member	Imprints or compressed moulds of larval cases	Larval caddisfly cases made of conchostracan shells.	
Heteroptera indet.	Indeterminate	Cerro Cóndor; Estancia Fossati; Estancia El Torito; Estancia La Sin Rumbo	Las Chacritas Member; Puesto Almada Member	Fragmentary wings	Incertade Sedis	Extant example
Neorthophlebidae indet.	Indeterminate	Gan Gan	Puesto Almada member	Wings and parts of body	Incertade Sedis, it may come from the Cañadón Calcáreo Formation.	
Ostracindusia	O. isp.	Cerro Cóndor; Gan Gan	Las Chacritas Member; Puesto Almada Member	Imprints or compressed moulds of larval cases	Larval caddisfly cases made of ostracodan shells.	
Terrindusia	T. isp.	Cerro Cóndor; Estancia Fossati; Gan Gan	Las Chacritas Member; Puesto Almada Member	Imprints or compressed moulds of larval cases	Larval caddisfly cases made of clasts or terrigenous particles	
Trichoptera indet.	Indeterminate	Cerro Cóndor; Estancia Fossati; Estancia El Torito; Estancia La Sin Rumbo	Las Chacritas Member; Puesto Almada Member	Wings and larval cases	Incertade Sedis	Extant example

== Vertebrates ==
=== Fish ===
Genus	Species	Location	Stratigraphic position	Material	Notes	Images
Archaeomaenidae? indet.	Indeterminate	Cerro Cóndor; Cañadón Asfalto; Cañadón Miyanao; Estancia Fossati; Localidad de Canela; Cañadón Asfalto; Quebrada Subsidiaria	Las Chacritas Member	Isolated large median fin & Isolated Scales	Incertade Sedis	Example of Archaeomaenidae, Archaeomaene

=== Amphibians ===
Genus	Species	Location	Stratigraphic position	Material	Notes	Images
Anura indet.	Indeterminate	Canela	Las Chacritas Member	Non clarified	Incertade Sedis	
Notobatrachus	N. reigi; Cf.N. spp.	Cañadon Bagual; Canela; Cerro Cóndor; Queso Rallado; Sitio Frenguelli; Zitarrosa	Las Chacritas Member	Many articulated, mostly complete skeletons	An early frog of the family Notobatrachidae.	Notobatrachus
Salientia indet.	Indeterminate	Cerro Cóndor; Queso Rallado	Las Chacritas Member	Non clarified	"Notobatrachus-like"	

=== Turtles ===
Genus	Species	Location	Stratigraphic position	Material	Notes	Images
Condorchelys	C. antiqua; C. cf.antiqua; C. spp.	Queso Rallado; Cañadon Bagual; Chucrut; Canela facies	Las Chacritas Member	Holotype: Most of a skull, carapace, and plastron.; MPEF-PV 3163, left humerus; MPEF-PV 3164, costal plate	A stem turtle (Mesochelydian). Likely occupied aquatic or semiaquatic niches.	
Testudinata indet.	Indeterminate	Canela facies	Las Chacritas Member	plastrons	Incertade Sedis	

=== Lepidosaurs ===
Genus	Species	Location	Stratigraphic position	Material	Notes	Images
Sphenocondor	S. gracilis	Queso Rallado	Las Chacritas Member	Dentary	A Sphenodontian Rhynchocephalian, maybe part of an endemic Gondwanan clade.	

=== Crocodylomorpha ===
Genus	Species	Location	Stratigraphic position	Material	Notes	Images
Crocodylomorpha indet.	Indeterminate	Queso Rallado	Las Chacritas Member	Teeth & several isolated remains	Incertade Sedis	

=== Pterosaurs ===
Genus	Species	Location	Stratigraphic position	Material	Notes	Images
Allkaruen	A. koi	Canadón Carrizal	Las Chacritas Member	A braincase, as well as a mandible and cervical vertebrae.	A pterosaur either related with Breviquartossa or maybe even a sister group of monofenestratan (Wukongopteridae + Pterodactyloidea).	Allkaruen
Ctenochasmatidae? indet.	Indeterminate	Queso Rallado	Not Determined	Isolated tooth	Resembles the teeth of Pterodaustro.	
Melkamter	M. pateko	Queso Rallado	Las Chacritas Member	Partial skull and associated postcranial elements	A monofenestratan pterosaur, representing the oldest known record of this clade	Melkamter
Scaphognathinae? indet.	Indeterminate	Las Chacritas	Las Chacritas Member	Uncatalogued specimens, several mandibles, braincase, shoulder girdle, two humeri, several wing-finger phalanges	Possibly a rhamphorhynchoid with a wingspan of about 1.5–2 metres (4.9–6.6 ft). The mandible morphology is similar to scaphognathines.	

=== Dinosaurs ===
==== Theropods ====
During a campaign conducted in early 2021, remains of a large theropod dinosaur were found near the town of Las Chacritas. In 2020 a new fossil locality was found, named Cañadón de las Huellas, due to the large number of sauropods, and probably theropods, footprints on one of the canyon walls. In the same locality in 2021, articulated remains were recovered and represent at least one sauropod and one large theropod. At least four theropod morphotypes, including one with ceratosaur and another with Piatnitzkysauridae affinities, are known from the Cañadón Bagual.

Genus	Species	Location	Stratigraphic position	Material	Notes	Images
Asfaltovenator	A. vialidadi	Cerro Condor	Las Chacritas Member	Nearly compete skull and largely complete front half of the skeleton forward of the hips, distal pubis and fermur and proximal fibula and tibia, partial foot	A probable early member of Allosauroidea	Asfaltovenator
Averostra indet.	Indeterminate	Cerro Cóndor; Puesto el Quemado; Cerro Bayo	Las Chacritas Member	Isolated teeth: MPEF BA 182/08, BA 40/08, BA 09/80, BA 88/08, BA 252G+165/08 A, BA 252G+165/08 B, BA 252G+165/08 C	Resemble those assigned to the families Ceratosauridae, Megalosauridae and Abelisauridae	
Ceratosauridae indet.	Indeterminate	Cañadon Bagual	Las Chacritas Member	A dentary with teeth in situ, MPEF-PV 6775	It resembles the dentary of Ceratosaurus	
Condorraptor	C. currumili	Las Chacritas	Las Chacritas Member	Partial articulated skeleton	A relative of Piatnitzkysaurus from the same formation, and a possible junior synonym of it as well.	Condorraptor
Dromaeosauridae indet.	Indeterminate	Cerro Cóndor; Puesto el Quemado; Cerro Bayo	Las Chacritas Member	Isolated Teeth: MEPF BA 61/08, BA 103/08, BA 32/08 A, BA 32/08 B, BA 104/08, BA 226B/08, PV 3498, BA 29/08, BA51/08, BA 270/08 a, BA 270/08 b, BA 270/08 c	Resemble those assigned to the family Dromaeosauridae. Alternatively, they could belong to basal members of Coelurosauria	
Eoabelisaurus	E. mefi	Jugo Luco	Las Chacritas Member	A nearly complete articulated skeleton	A Neoceratosaur, which was suggested to be a basal member of Abelisauria, but also a member of Ceratosauridae	Eoabelisaurus
Megalosauridae indet.	Indeterminate	Cerro Cóndor; Puesto el Quemado; Cerro Bayo	Las Chacritas Member	Isolated Teeth: MPEF PV 1175, BA 66/08, PV 1356, PV 1357	Resemble those assigned to the family Megalosauridae.	
Neotheropoda indet.	Indeterminate	Cerro Cóndor; Puesto el Quemado; Cerro Bayo	Las Chacritas Member	Isolated Teeth: MPEF BA 68/08, BA 92/08, PV 3499, BA 68/08, BA 183/08	Resemble those assigned to basal neotheropods, such as members of Coelophysoidea.	
Piatnitzkysauridae indet.	Indeterminate	Cerro Cóndor; Puesto el Quemado; Cerro Bayo	Las Chacritas Member	Isolated Teeth & Cranial remains: MPEF 1717 CC 205, PV 3440A A, PV 3440A B, PV 3440A C, PV 3440A D, PV 3440A E, PV 3440A F, PV 3440A G	Resemble those assigned to members of Piatnitzkysauridae.	
Piatnitzkysaurus	P. floresi	Cerro Cóndor South	Las Chacritas Member	Two "fragmentary skulls with associated postcranium."	Possible senior synonym of Condorraptor from the same formation.	Piatnitzkysaurus
Spinosauridae? indet.	Indeterminate	Cerro Cóndor	Las Chacritas Member	Isolated Teeth : MEPF PV 1350	Alternatively, they could belong to members of Ceratosauria	
Tetanurae indet.	Indeterminate	Cerro Cóndor; Puesto el Quemado; Cerro Bayo	Las Chacritas Member	Isolated Teeth : MEPF BA 84/08, BA 49/08 A, BA 49/08 B, BA 64/08, BA 65/08, BA 266/07	Resemble teeth of members of Megalosauridae and Dromaeosauridae	
Theropoda indet.	Indeterminate	Cerro Cóndor	Las Chacritas Member	Isolated Teeth : MPEF PV 1640	"Outlier" tooth that doesn't fit in any previously known morphotype, maybe due to preservation	
Theropodipedia indet.	Indeterminate	Cerro Cóndor	Las Chacritas Member	Footprints	Incertade Sedis	

==== Sauropodomorphs ====
A sediment tubular shaped mass enriched in organic matter, closely associated within the ventral area of articulated remains of a sauropod, was recovered at Cerro Condor, composed of a high concentration of pollen grains & cuticular fragments, mainly leaves of two morphotypes (Araucariaceae and Cheirolepidiaceae), probably representing the gut contents of the sauropod, inferring a conifer-based diet.

Genus	Species	Location	Stratigraphic position	Material	Notes	Images
Bagualia	B. alba	Cañadon Bagual	Las Chacritas Member	The partial skeletons of three individuals	An early member of Eusauropoda, related with the African genus Spinophorosaurus	
Diplodocidae indet.	Indeterminate	Cerro Condor Sur	Las Chacritas Member	MACN-CH 934: axial neural arches and spines, an ilium, a pubis, ?two or ?three ischia, and two maxillae	This specimen shows strong Diplodocidae affinities, yet it has been considered either a derived non-neosauropodan eusauropod (having resemblance with Lapparentosaurus in some characters) or even a basal neosauropod (also resembling Haplocanthosaurus)	
Eusauropoda indet.	Indeterminate	Cerro Condor Sur	Las Chacritas Member	MACN-CH 230: three dorsal vertebrae	Likely a eusauropod, possibly a cetiosaurid. Smaller than other sauropod taxa found in the formation.	
Eusauropoda? indet.	Indeterminate	Cerro Condor Este	Las Chacritas Member	MPEF-PV 12010: A left premaxilla	It has the thickest enamel of the sampled sauropod specimens	
Patagosaurus	P. fariasi	Cerro Condor	Las Chacritas Member	Many specimens, including a partial skull.	A non-neosauropodan eusauropodan member of Cetiosauridae.	
Sauropodiformes indet.	Indeterminate	Queso Rallado, near Cerro Cóndor	Las Chacritas Member	Isolated Teeth: MPEF-PV 10860	An indeterminate Sauropodiform or a very basal sauropod or even dental material of Volkheimeria.	
Sauropoda indet.	Indeterminate	Cerro Condor Sur	Las Chacritas Member	MACN-CH 219, 223(+221), 231	Too fragmentary to be ascribed to any taxon.	
Titanosauriformes indet.	Indeterminate	Queso Rallado, near Cerro Cóndor	Las Chacritas Member	Isolated Teeth: MPEF-PV 10606	An indeterminate Titanosauriform. It can be alternatively a basal Eusauropod. Possible relationships with Atlasaurus	
Volkheimeria	V. chubutensis	Cerro Cóndor South	Las Chacritas Member	"Partial skeleton consisting of presacral and sacral vertebrae, pelvis, [and] hindlimb."	Either a gravisaur or a sister taxon of the Indian genus Barapasaurus	

==== Ornithischians ====
Genus	Species	Location	Stratigraphic position	Material	Notes	Images
Cerapoda? indet.	Indeterminate	Queso Rallado	Las Chacritas Member	Isolated ungual phalanx and Isolated Teeth: MPEF-PV 3818, MPEF-PV 3824, MEPF-PV 3820, MEPF-PV 3825, MEPF-PV 10861, MPEF-PV 10823, MPEF-PV 3821 & MPEF-PV 10864	Some of the referred remains have been reclassified as Manidens.	
Heterodontosauridae indet.	Indeterminate	Queso Rallado	Las Chacritas Member	Metapodials, caudal vertebrae, and isolated phalanges: MPEF-PV 3826	This specimen may have been at least partially arboreal. Principal component analysis found that the feet were most similar to those of tree-perching birds.	
Manidens	M. condorensis	Queso Rallado; Sitio Frenguelli; Sitio Canela	Las Chacritas Member	Partial articulated specimen, skull & associated elements as well referred isolated teeth: MPEF-PV 3809, MPEF-PV 3211, MPEF-PV 3808, MPEF-PV 10867, MPEF-PV 1719, MPEF-PV 1786, MPEF-PV 1718, MPEF-PV 3810, MPEF-PV 3811, MPEF-PV 3812, MPEF-PV 3813, MPEF-PV 3814, MPEF-PV 3815, MPEF-PV 3816, MPEF-PV 10866	A primitive and small heterodontosaurid.	
Ornithischia indet.	Indeterminate	Queso Rallado	Las Chacritas Member	Isolated teeth: MPEF-PV 3817, MPEFPV 3819, MPEF-PV 3822.	Incertade Sedis	

=== Mammals ===
Genus	Species	Location	Stratigraphic position	Material	Notes	Images
Allotheria indet.	Indeterminate	Queso Rallado	Las Chacritas Member	Isolated Teeth	Incertade Sedis	
Argentoconodon	A. fariasorum	Queso Rallado	Las Chacritas Member	MPEF-PV2362, fragmentary left maxilla, MPEF-PV2363 partial skeleton, MPEFPV2364 isolated complete right upper last molariform	A volaticotherian (Alticonodontinae), closely related to the Asian genus Volaticotherium, having similar postcraneal appearance, indicating possible gliding capabilities, yet better material is needed to prove it.	
Asfaltomylos	A. patagonicus	Queso Rallado	Las Chacritas Member	MPEF PV 1671, complete lower maxilla	An Australosphenidan, related to Henosferus in Henosferidae.	
Condorodon	C. spanios	Queso Rallado	Las Chacritas Member	MPEF-PV 2365, isolated complete lower left molariform	An "amphilestid" triconodont, related with the late jurassic African Tendagurodon.	
Henosferus	H. molus; H. sp.	Queso Rallado; Canela	Las Chacritas Member	MPEF 2353 right lower jaw, MPEF 2354 Left lower jaw, MPEF 2357 Left lower jaw, referred MPEF 2355 isolated upper premolar	An Australosphenidan, related to Asfaltomylos in Henosferidae, being twice as large as this last one.	

== Fungi ==
Genus	Species	Location	Stratigraphic position	Member	Material	Ecogroup	Palaeoclimate requirements	Notes
Annella	A. capitata	Central Patagonia	Cañadon Lahuincó	Las Chacritas Member	Hypae and Miospores	Unknown: either Aquatic (Freshwater) or Parasitic	Unknown, suggested highly seasonality	This species is recovered in both coal seams and proximal prodelta sediments, making the assignation of a biome complex.

== Plants ==
According to a palynological study the dominant pollen was produced by the conifer families Cheirolepidiaceae (Classopollis) and Araucariaceae (mainly Araucariacites and Callialasporites), suggesting that warm-temperate and relatively humid conditions under highly seasonal climate prevailed during the depositional times of the unit. The abundance of Botryococcus supports the presence of a shallow lake with probably saline conditions. Locally, the Cañadón Asfalto represents a more poor record of the floras seen in the undeliying Lonco Tapial Formation, with its closest floras found on the Antarctic Peninsula Ellsworth Land Volcanic Group at Potter Peak, sharing Brachyphyllum spp. and Elatocladus confertus.

=== Phytoplankton ===
Possible freshwater "calcareous algae", associated with conifer shoots and aquatic invertebrates, have been reported from Cerro Caracoles.

Genus	Species	Location	Member	Material	Ecogroup	Palaeoclimate requirements	Notes	Images
Botryococcus	B. sp. cf. B. braunii; B. spp	Cañadon Lahuincó; Cañadón Caracoles; Cerro Bandera	Las Chacritas Member; Puesto Almada Member	Algae	Aquatic (freshwater); Alkaline indicator	Highly seasonal climate	A freshwater algae of the family Botryococcaceae. Reaching in some samples about 96 to 70%.	Extant specimen
Leiosphaeridia	L. sp.	Cañadon Lahuincó; Cañadón Caracoles	Las Chacritas Member	Zygospores	Aquatic (freshwater)	Temperate to warm; seasonal climate	Algae or Algae Acritarch of the family Prasinophyceae.	
Ovoidites	O. spp.	Cañadon Lahuincó; Cañadón Caracoles	Las Chacritas Member	Zygospores	Aquatic (freshwater)	Temperate to warm; seasonal climate	Algae of the family Zygnemataceae	Extant Spirogyra.

=== Bryophyta ===
Genus	Species	Location	Member	Material	Ecogroup	Palaeoclimate requirements	Notes	Images
Antulsporites	A. saevus	Cañadon Lahuincó; Cañadón Caracoles	Las Chacritas Member	Spores	Upland and Riverside	Can withstand long periods of drought; seasonal climate	Affinities with the family Sphagnaceae in the Sphagnopsida.	Extant Sphagnum.
Neoraistrickia	N. cf. suratensis	Cañadon Lahuincó; Cañadón Caracoles	Las Chacritas Member	Spores	Upland and Lowland	Warm to temperate, relatively wet	Affinities with the family Selaginellaceae and Lycopodiaceae in the Lycopsida.	
Nevesisporites	N. vallatus; N. cf. undatus; N. cf. radiatus	Cañadon Lahuincó; Cañadón Caracoles	Las Chacritas Member	Spores	Upland and Riverside	Can withstand long periods of drought; seasonal climate	Affinities with Bryophyta.	
Retitriletes	R. austroclavatidites; R. semimuris; R. sp. 1	Cañadon Lahuincó; Cañadón Caracoles	Las Chacritas Member	Spores	Upland and Lowland	Warm to temperate, relatively wet	Affinities with Bryophyta.	
Stereisporites	S. sp. cf. S. psilatus	Cañadon Lahuincó; Cañadón Caracoles	Las Chacritas Member	Spores	Upland and Riverside	Can withstand long periods of drought; seasonal climate	Affinities with the family Sphagnaceae in the Sphagnopsida.	

=== Equisetales ===
Genus	Species	Location	Member	Material	Ecogroup	Palaeoclimate requirements	Notes	Images
Equisetites	E. approximatus; E. spp.	Cañadon Asfalto; Cañadon Lahuincó; Paso de Indios; Pomelo locality	Las Chacritas Member	Stems	Lowland and Riverside	Warm to temperate, relatively wet	Plants of the group Equisetales. Usually linked with riversides	Equisetites specimen

=== Pteridophyta ===
Genus	Species	Location	Member	Material	Ecogroup	Palaeoclimate requirements	Notes	Images
Baculatisporites	B. comaumensis	Cañadon Lahuincó	Las Chacritas Member	Spores	Lowland and Riverside	Warm to temperate, relatively wet	Affinities with the family Osmundaceae in the Polypodiopsida.	Extant Osmunda.
Biretisporites	B. sp. A	Cañadon Lahuincó; Cañadón Caracoles	Las Chacritas Member	Spores	Lowland and Riverside	Warm to temperate, relatively wet	Affinities with the Marattiaceae in the Polypodiopsida.	Extant Marattia.
Cadargasporites	C. sp. cf. C. reticulatus	Cañadon Lahuincó; Cañadón Caracoles	Las Chacritas Member	Spores	Lowland and Riverside	Warm to temperate, relatively wet	Incertade sedis	
Cladophlebis	C. grahami; C. oblonga	Cañadon Asfalto; Cañadon Lahuincó; Paso de Indios; Pomelo locality	Las Chacritas Member	Isolated Pinnae	Lowland and Riverside	Warm to temperate, relatively wet	Plants of the family Osmundaceae.	
Clavatisporites	C. spp.	Cañadon Lahuincó; Cañadón Caracoles	Las Chacritas Member	Spores	Lowland and Riverside	Warm to temperate, relatively wet	Incertade sedis	
Deltoidospora	D. australis; D. minor	Cañadon Lahuincó	Las Chacritas Member	Spores	Upland, Lowland and Riverside	Warm to temperate, relatively wet	Affinities with the families Cyatheaceae/Dicksoniaceae Dipteridaceae/Matoniaceae in the Polypodiopsida.	
Dictyophyllidites	D. harrisii	Cañadon Lahuincó; Cañadón Caracoles	Las Chacritas Member	Spores	Lowland and Riverside	Warm to temperate, relatively wet	Affinities with the families Cyatheaceae/Dicksoniaceae Dipteridaceae/Matoniaceae in the Polypodiopsida.	
Gleichenites	G. cf.taquetrensis	Paso de Indios	Las Chacritas Member	Isolated Pinnae	Lowland and Riverside	Warm to temperate, relatively wet	Plants of the family Gleicheniales.	
Ischyosporites	I. marburgensis	Cañadon Lahuincó; Cañadón Caracoles	Las Chacritas Member	Spores	Upland, Lowland Riverside	Warm to temperate, relatively wet	Affinities with the family Lygodiaceae and Schizaeaceae in the Polypodiopsida.	Extant Lygodium.
Klukisporites	K. lacunus; K. variegatus; K. sp. cf. K. scaberis; K. spp.	Cañadon Lahuincó; Cañadón Caracoles	Las Chacritas Member	Spores	Upland, Lowland Riverside	Warm to temperate, relatively wet	Affinities with the family Lygodiaceae and Schizaeaceae in the Polypodiopsida.	Extant Lygodium.
Obtusisporis	O. modestus	Cañadon Lahuincó; Cañadón Caracoles	Las Chacritas Member	Spores	Lowland and Riverside	Warm to temperate, relatively wet	Incertade sedis	
Osmundacidites	O. spp.	Cañadon Lahuincó	Las Chacritas Member	Spores	Lowland and Riverside	Warm to temperate, relatively wet	Affinities with the family Osmundaceae in the Polypodiopsida.	
Retitriletes	R. semimuris	Cañadon Lahuincó	Las Chacritas Member	Spores	Lowland and Riverside	Warm to temperate, relatively wet	Incertade sedis	
Rugulatisporites	R. sp.	Cañadon Lahuincó	Las Chacritas Member	Spores	Lowland and Riverside	Warm to temperate, relatively wet	Affinities with the family Osmundaceae in the Polypodiopsida.	
Sphenopteris	S. patagonica; S. hallei	Cañadon Asfalto; Cañadon Lahuincó	Las Chacritas Member	Isolated Pinnae	Upland, Lowland and Riverside	Warm to temperate, relatively wet	Affinity for mesozoic specimens is uncertain, yet has been suggested to be fronds of Dicksoniaceae.	
Todisporites	T. minor	Cañadon Lahuincó	Las Chacritas Member	Spores	Upland	Warm to temperate, relatively wet. Can withstand long periods of drought; seasonal climate	Affinities with the family Osmundaceae in the Polypodiopsida.	
Trilobosporites	T. sp.	Cañadon Lahuincó	Las Chacritas Member	Spores	Upland, Lowland and Riverside	Warm to temperate, relatively wet	Affinities with the families Cyatheaceae/Dicksoniaceae Dipteridaceae/Matoniaceae in the Polypodiopsida.	
Verrucosisporites	V. varians	Cañadon Lahuincó	Las Chacritas Member	Spores	Upland	Can withstand long periods of drought; seasonal climate	Affinities with the family Osmundaceae in the Polypodiopsida.	

=== Peltaspermales ===
Genus	Species	Location	Member	Material	Ecogroup	Palaeoclimate requirements	Notes	Images
Alisporites	A. similis; A. lowoodensis; A. spp.	Cañadon Lahuincó; Cañadón Caracoles; Cerro Bandera	Las Chacritas Member; Puesto Almada Member	Pollen	Riverside	Warm, can withstand long periods of drought; seasonal climate	Affinities with the families Peltaspermaceae, Corystospermaceae or Umkomasiaceae in the Peltaspermales.	
Antevsia	A. sp.	Pomelo locality	Las Chacritas Member	Pollen-bearing organs	Lowland and Riverside	Warm, can withstand long periods of drought; seasonal climate	Plants of the group Peltaspermaceae.	
Archangelskya	A. furcata	Cañadon Asfalto; Cañadon Lahuincó	Las Chacritas Member	Isolated Pinnae	Lowland and Riverside	Warm, can withstand long periods of drought; seasonal climate	Plants of the group Pteridospermata	
Lepidopteris	L. scassoi	Pomelo locality; A12 locality	Las Chacritas Member	Isolated Pinnae	Lowland and Riverside	Warm, can withstand long periods of drought; seasonal climate	Plants of the group Peltaspermaceae. This species represents the youngest record of the genus, by more than 20 Myr.	
Peltaspermum	P. sp.	Pomelo locality; A12 locality	Las Chacritas Member	Ovuliferous Cones	Lowland and Riverside	Warm, can withstand long periods of drought; seasonal climate	Plants of the group Peltaspermaceae.	
Vitreisporites	V. pallidus	Cañadon Lahuincó	Las Chacritas Member	Pollen	Riverside	Warm, relatively wet	From the family Caytoniaceae in the Caytoniales.	

=== Cycadeoidopsida ===
Genus	Species	Location	Member	Material	Ecogroup	Palaeoclimate requirements	Notes	Images
Zamites	Z. sp.	Pomelo locality; A12 locality	Las Chacritas Member	Leaflets	Lowland and Riverside	Warm to temperate, can withstand long periods of drought; seasonal climate	Affinities with Bennettitales inside Cycadeoidopsida.	

=== Czekanowskiales ===
Genus	Species	Location	Member	Material	Ecogroup	Palaeoclimate requirements	Notes	Images
Phoenicopsis	P. sp.	Cañadon Asfalto; Pomelo locality	Las Chacritas Member	Pollen Organs	Lowland and Riverside	Warm to temperate, can withstand long periods of drought; seasonal climate	Plants of the group Leptostrobales (Czekanowskiales).	

=== Gnetopsida ===
Genus	Species	Location	Member	Material	Ecogroup	Palaeoclimate requirements	Notes	Images
Ephedripites	E. spp.	Cañadon Lahuincó; Cerro Bandera	Las Chacritas Member; Puesto Almada Member	Pollen	Lowland and Riverside	Warm to temperate, can withstand long periods of drought; seasonal climate	A Pollen Grain, affinities with Ephedraceae inside Gnetopsida.	Extant Ephedra.

=== Coniferophyta ===
Genus	Species	Location	Member	Material	Ecogroup	Palaeoclimate requirements	Notes	Images
Agathoxylon	A. spp.	Cañadon Bagual	Las Chacritas Member	Fossil Wood	Upland, Lowland and Riverside	?Warm to temperate, relatively wet	Affinities with the family Araucariaceae in the Pinales.	
Araucariacites	A. australis; A. fissus; A. pergranulatus; A. cf. A. pergranulatus; A. sp. A	Cañadon Lahuincó; Cañadón Caracoles; Cerro Bandera	Las Chacritas Member; Puesto Almada Member	Pollen	Upland, Lowland and Riverside	?Warm to temperate, relatively wet	Affinities with the family Araucariaceae in the Pinales.	
Araucaritites	A. chuchensis; A. spp.	Cañadon Asfalto; Pomelo locality; A12 locality; Cañadon Lahuincó; Estancia La Vistosa; Paso de Indios	Las Chacritas Member	Ovuliferous scales	Upland, Lowland and Riverside	?Warm to temperate, relatively wet	Plants of the family Araucariaceae.	
Athrotaxites	A. ungeri	Cañadon Asfalto; Cañadon Lahuincó	Las Chacritas Member	Branched shoots	Upland	?Warm to temperate, relatively wet	Plants of the family Taxodiaceae	
Austrohamia	A. asfaltensis	Cañadon Lahuincó	Las Chacritas Member	Branched shoots & Ovuliferous cones	Upland, Lowland and Riverside	?Warm to temperate, relatively wet	Plants of the family Cunninghamioideae. Along with the also Argentinian species A. minuta, this specimens represent the oldest fossil taxa that can be confidently assigned to Cupressaceae sensu lato	
Brachyoxylon	B. currumilii	Pomelo locality	Las Chacritas Member	Fossil Wood	Upland, Lowland and Riverside	?Warm to temperate, relatively wet	Plants of the family Araucariaceae or Cheirolepidiaceae	
Brachyphyllum	B. cf. lotenaense; B. spp.	Cañadon Asfalto; Cerro Caracoles; Las Chacritas; Pomelo locality; A12 locality; Cañadon Lahuincó; Paso de Indios; Canela locality	Las Chacritas Member	Branched shoots & Ovuliferous cones	Upland, Lowland and Riverside	?Warm to temperate, relatively wet	Plants of the family Araucariaceae or Cheirolepidiaceae	
Callialasporites	C. dampieri; C. microvelatus; C. segmentatus; C. trilobatus; C. turbatus; C. minus; C. sp. 1	Cañadon Lahuincó; Cañadón Caracoles; Cerro Bandera	Las Chacritas Member; Puesto Almada Member	Pollen	Upland, Lowland and Riverside	?Warm to temperate, relatively wet	Affinities with the family Araucariaceae in the Pinales.	
Cerebropollenites	C. macroverrucosus; C. carlylensis; C. mesozoicus; C. sp. 1	Cañadon Lahuincó; Cañadón Caracoles; Cerro Bandera	Las Chacritas Member; Puesto Almada Member	Pollen	Upland, Lowland and Riverside	?Warm to temperate, relatively wet	Affinities with both Sciadopityaceae and Miroviaceae in the Pinopsida.	Extant Sciadopitys.
Classopollis	C. classoides; C. intrareticulatus; C. simplex; C. itunensis; C. torosus	Cañadon Lahuincó; Cañadón Caracoles; Cerro Bandera	Las Chacritas Member; Puesto Almada Member	Pollen	Lowland and Coastal lake	Warm to temperate, can withstand long periods of drought; seasonal climate	Affinities with the Hirmeriellaceae in the Pinopsida. Classopollis is the most abundant component of the assemblage, with ranges from 73 to 81.6% to 89.6%-89.7% in some samples.	
Elatoclaudus	E. confertus; E. jabalpurensis	Cañadon Asfalto; Cañadon Lahuincó; Pomelo locality	Las Chacritas Member	Branched shoots	Upland and Lowland	Warm to temperate, can withstand long periods of drought; seasonal climate	Plants of the family Cupressaceae	
Exesipollenites	E. sp.	Cañadon Lahuincó	Las Chacritas Member	Pollen	Lowland and Coastal lake	Warm to temperate, can withstand long periods of drought; seasonal climate	Affinities with the Hirmeriellaceae in the Pinopsida.	
Inaperturopollenites	I. indicus; I. giganteus; I. microgranulatus; I. cf. reidi; I. sp. 1; I. sp. 2	Cañadon Lahuincó	Las Chacritas Member	Pollen	Upland, Lowland and Riverside	?Warm to temperate, relatively wet	Affinities with the family Araucariaceae in the Pinales.	
Indusiisporites	I. parvisaccatus; I. globosaccus; I. sp. 1; I. sp. 2; I. sp. 3	Cañadón Lahuincó; Cañadón Caracoles	Las Chacritas Member	Pollen	Upland	Temperate, relatively dry	Affinities with the family Podocarpaceae.	
Kaokoxylon	K. spp.	Cañadon Bagual	Las Chacritas Member	Fossil Wood	Upland, Lowland and Riverside	?Warm to temperate, relatively wet	Affinities with the family Araucariaceae in the Pinales.	
Microcachryidites	M. castellanosii; M. antarcticus	Cañadón Lahuincó; Cañadón Caracoles; Cerro Bandera	Las Chacritas Member; Puesto Almada Member	Pollen	Upland	Temperate, relatively dry	Affinities with the family Podocarpaceae.	Extant Microcachrys
Pagiophyllum	P. divaricatum; P. fiestmantelli	Cañadon Asfalto; Pomelo locality; A12 locality; Cañadon Lahuincó; Paso de Indios; Canela locality	Las Chacritas Member	Branched shoots	Lowland and Coastal lake	Warm to temperate, can withstand long periods of drought; seasonal climate	Plants of the family Araucariaceae or Cheirolepidiaceae	
Pelourdea	P. sp.	Cañadon Asfalto	Las Chacritas Member	Pollen Organs	Lowland and Coastal lake	Warm to temperate, can withstand long periods of drought; seasonal climate	Suggested as a member of its own family, the "Pelourdeaceae". A hygrophytic riparian conifer with herbaceous or shrubby habit. Some specimens are difficult to identify.	
Perinopollenites	P. elatoides	Cañadón Lahuincó	Las Chacritas Member	Pollen	Upland and Lowland	Warm to temperate; seasonal climate	Affinities with the family Cupressaceae in the Pinopsida.	Extant Austrocedrus.
Phrixipollenites	P. sp.	Cañadón Lahuincó	Las Chacritas Member	Pollen	Upland	Temperate, relatively dry	Affinities with the family Podocarpaceae.	
Pinuspollenites	P. globosaccus	Cañadon Lahuincó; Cañadón Caracoles	Las Chacritas Member	Pollen	Upland, Lowland and Riverside	?Warm to temperate, relatively wet	Affinities with the family Pinaceae in the Pinopsida.	
Podocarpidites	P. verrucosus; P. astrictus; P. ellipticus; P. multesimus; P. variabilis; P. sp. cf. P. radiatus; P. sp. cf. P. verrucosus; P. sp. 1	Cañadón Lahuincó; Cañadón Caracoles	Las Chacritas Member	Pollen	Upland	Temperate, relatively dry	Affinities with the family Podocarpaceae in the Pinopsida.	Extant Podocarpus.
Podocarpoxylon	P. spp.	Cañadon Bagual	Las Chacritas Member	Fossil Wood	Upland, Lowland and Riverside	?Warm to temperate, relatively wet	Affinities with the family Podocarpaceae in the Pinopsida.	
Podosporites	P. variabilis; P. sp. 1	Cañadón Lahuincó; Cañadón Caracoles	Las Chacritas Member	Pollen	Upland	Temperate, relatively dry	Affinities with the family Podocarpaceae in the Pinopsida.	
Protocupressinoxylon	P. spp.	Cañadon Bagual	Las Chacritas Member	Fossil Wood	Upland, Lowland and Riverside	?Warm to temperate, relatively wet	Affinities with the family Hirmeriellaceae in the Pinopsida.	
Prototaxoxylon	P. spp.	Cañadon Bagual	Las Chacritas Member	Fossil Wood	Upland, Lowland and Riverside	?Warm to temperate, relatively wet	Affinities with the family Taxaceae in the Pinopsida. Alternatively, it can represent woods of the "Mesozoic Prototaxoxylon Group", an unnamed conifer family of possible Permian affinities.	

== See also ==
- Cañadón Asfalto Formation
- Cañadón Calcáreo Formation
