= Mesozoic mammals of Madagascar =

Overview of mammals during the Mesozoic in Madagascar

Several mammals are known from the Mesozoic of Madagascar. The Bathonian (middle Jurassic) Ambondro, known from a piece of jaw with three teeth, is the earliest known mammal with molars showing the modern, tribosphenic pattern that is characteristic of marsupial and placental mammals. Interpretations of its affinities have differed; one proposal places it in a group known as Australosphenida with other Mesozoic tribosphenic mammals from the southern continents (Gondwana) as well as the monotremes, while others favor closer affinities with northern (Laurasian) tribosphenic mammals or specifically with placentals. At least five species are known from the Maastrichtian (late Cretaceous), including a yet undescribed species known from a nearly complete skeleton that may represent a completely new group of mammals. The gondwanathere Lavanify, known from two teeth, is most closely related to other gondwanatheres found in India and Argentina. Two other teeth may represent another gondwanathere or a different kind of mammal. One molar fragment is one of the few known remains of a multituberculate mammal from Gondwana and another (UA 8699) has been interpreted as either a marsupial or a placental.

== Jurassic ==
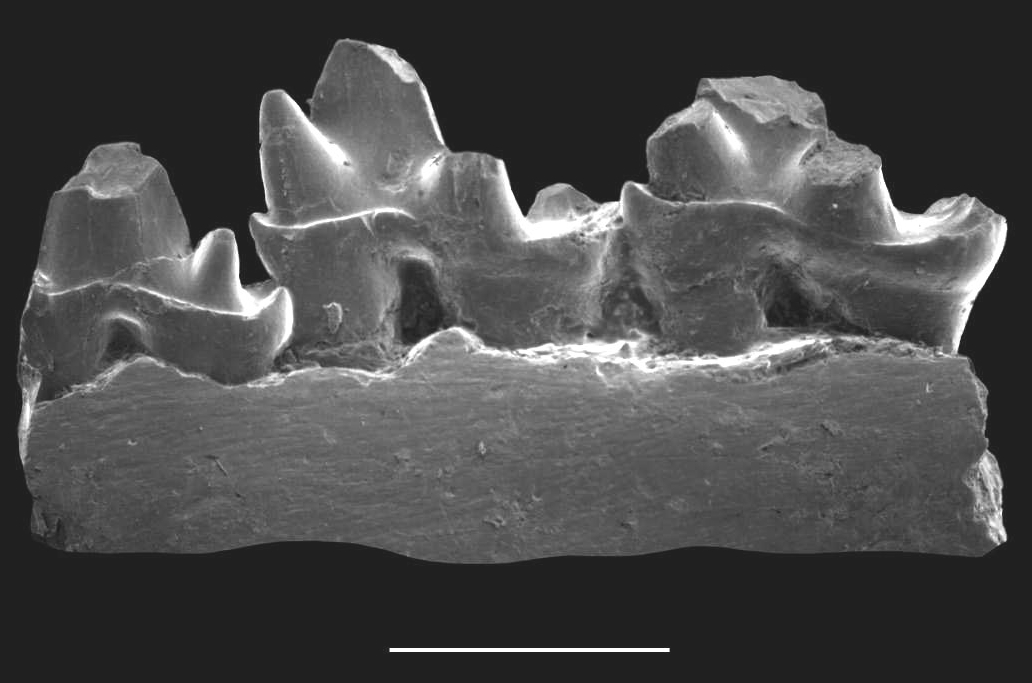
Jaw fragment of Ambondro mahabo seen from the inner (lingual) side. Scale bar is 1 mm.

Ambondro mahabo was described from the middle Jurassic (Bathonian, about 167 million years ago) of northwestern Madagascar in 1999. It is known from a single lower jaw fragment with three teeth, probably the last premolar and first two molars. The molars have been interpreted as showing the tribosphenic pattern that is characteristic of modern mammals; Ambondro is the oldest known mammal with such a pattern. This led its discoverers to propose that the ancestors of tribosphenic mammals arose in the south (Gondwana), not, as generally assumed, in the north (Laurasia). In 2001, however, paleontologist Zhe-Xi Luo and colleagues alternatively proposed that Ambondro was part of a clade with Ausktribosphenos from the Cretaceous of Australia and the monotremes that developed tribosphenicity independently from other mammals (Boreosphenida). This clade, Australosphenida, has since been expanded with more recently discovered species from Argentina (Asfaltomylos and Henosferus) and Australia (Bishops). Other paleontologists have disagreed with this interpretation and proposed different models; for example, in 2001 Denise Sigogneau-Russell and colleagues proposed that although Ausktribosphenos and monotremes were related, Ambondro was not and was in fact more similar to boreosphenidans, and in 2003 Michael Woodburne and colleagues excluded monotremes from Australosphenida and placed the remaining australosphenidans close to placentals. The deposits that produced Ambondro have yielded some reptiles, but no other mammals.

== Cretaceous ==
The Mahajanga Basin of northwestern Madagascar has produced a rich late Cretaceous fauna, including various dinosaurs and crocodyliforms as well as mammals, found by the team of David W. Krause since 1993. Many of these taxa show affinities with similarly aged South American and Indian animals, also parts of Gondwana. The mammalian fauna consists of several taxa known only by isolated teeth and a single reasonably complete skeleton, none of which can be plausibly related to the Recent Madagascar fauna (see list of mammals of Madagascar). The fossils come from the Maastrichtian (latest Cretaceous) of the Anembalembo Member of the Maevarano Formation.

Two teeth, one complete and one damaged, form the known material of the gondwanathere Lavanify, first described in 1997. The teeth are high-crowned and curved; one contains a deep cementum-filled furrow and the other at least one deep pit (infundibulum). Lavanify appears to be most closely related to the Indian gondwanathere Bharattherium and more distantly to the other gondwanatheres, which are known from Argentina. Two other teeth, not yet fully described, may represent different tooth positions of another gondwanathere. One, a fragmentary molariform (molar or molar-like premolar—the identities of gondwanathere tooth are poorly understood) is larger and lower-crowned than the Lavanify teeth and the other, which is complete and unworn, is yet lower-crowned and has the surface obliquely oriented. Its crown consists of a W-shaped ridge with the parts separated by deep infundibula. This second tooth may also represent a completely different, yet unknown mammalian group.

A fragmentary molar, preserving two cusps, is identified as from a multituberculate. Although multituberculates are common in nearly contemporaneous deposits in Laurasia, this tooth is one of the few records from Gondwana; a few fragmentary remains, the multituberculate affinities of some of which are disputed, are also known from South America (Argentodites), Africa (Hahnodon), and Australia (Corriebaatar). Another fragmentary tooth, UA 8699, is recognizable as a tribosphenic lower molar. Krause identified it in 2001 as a marsupial, but in 2003 a group led by Alexander Averianov instead argued that the tooth was placental and related to zhelestids (a primitive group possibly related to ungulates). Both placentals and marsupials are mostly known from Laurasia during the Cretaceous.

In addition to these fragmentary teeth, the Maevarano Formation has also yielded a nearly complete, articulated skeleton of an immature, cat-sized mammal that has not yet been fully described. It is the most complete mammal known from the Mesozoic of Gondwana. Its skull is damaged, but its unusual dentition is preserved. The incisors (two on each side of the upper and one on each side of the lower jaw) project forwards and are separated from the three or four cheektooth in each side of the lower and upper jaws by a large diastema (gap). It shows primitive features, such as the presence of epipubic bones (in the pelvis), a septomaxilla (a small bone placed between the premaxilla and the maxilla in the upper jaw), (Note: In his 2000 conference abstract on this skeleton, Krause mentioned the absence of the septomaxilla as a derived character, but in the 2006 paper he and his colleagues wrote on the Cretaceous vertebrates of Madagascar, the "septomaxilla with prominent septomaxillary canal" was mentioned as a primitive feature of the skeleton. Here the more recent interpretation is followed.) and a deep zygomatic arch (cheekbone). On the other hand, it has derived traits like the presence of a well-developed trochlea on the distal (far) end of the humerus (upper arm bone), the absence of a rim at the dorsal (upper) margin of the acetabulum (the opening in the pelvis which receives the head of the femur), a small lesser trochanter of the femur (upper leg bone), reduced contact between the fibula (the smaller of the two lower leg bones) and the calcaneum (heel bone), and the dentition. In a 2000 abstract, Krause identified it as a therian (a member of the group that includes marsupials, placentals, and their closest extinct relatives) more derived than the early Cretaceous Vincelestes of Argentina, but in 2006 he and colleagues instead refused to place it in any existing higher-order mammalian group and claimed that "it represents a major new nontherian clade".

== Literature cited ==
- Archibald, J.D. 2003. Timing and biogeography of the eutherian radiation: fossils and molecules compared (subscription required). Molecular Phylogenetics and Evolution 28:350–359.
- Averianov, A.O., Archibald, J.D. and Martin, T. 2003. Placental nature of the alleged marsupial from the Cretaceous of Madagascar. Acta Palaeontologica Polonica 48(1):149–151.
- Flynn, J.J., Parrish, J.M., Rakotosamimanana, B., Simpson, W.F. and Wyss, A.R. 1999. A Middle Jurassic mammal from Madagascar (subscription required). Nature 401:57–60.
- Krause, D.W. 2000. New mammalian specimens from the Late Cretaceous of Madagascar (subscription required). Journal of Vertebrate Paleontology 20:52A–53A.
- Krause, D.W. 2001. Fossil molar from a Madagascar marsupial (subscription required). Nature 412:497–498.
- Krause, D.W. 2003. Discovery of a relatively complete mammalian specimen from the Late Cretaceous of Madagascar (subscription required). Journal of Vertebrate Paleontology 23:69A.
- Krause, D.W. and Grine, F.E. 1996. The first multituberculates from Madagascar: Implications for Cretaceous biogeography (subscription required). Journal of Vertebrate Paleontology 16:46A.
- Krause, D.W., O'Connor, P.M., Rogers, K.C., Sampson, S.D., Buckley, G.A. and Rogers, R.R. 2006. Late Cretaceous terrestrial vertebrates from Madagascar: Implications for Latin American biogeography (subscription required). Annals of the Missouri Botanical Garden 93(2):178–208.
- Luo, Z.-X., Cifelli, R.L. and Kielan-Jaworowska, Z. 2001. Dual origin of tribosphenic mammals (subscription required). Nature 409:53–57.
- Luo, Z.-X., Kielan-Jaworowska, Z. and Cifelli, R.L. 2002. In quest for a phylogeny of Mesozoic mammals. Acta Palaeontologica Polonica 47(1):1–78.
- Rich, T.H., Vickers-Rich, P., Flannery, T.F., Kear, B.P., Cantrill, D.J., Komarower, P., Kool, L., Pickering, D., Trusler, P., Morton, S., Klaveren, N. van and Fitzgerald E.M.G. 2009. An Australian multituberculate and its palaeobiogeographic implications. Acta Palaeolontologica Polonica 54(1):1–6.
- Rougier, G.W., Martinelli, A.G., Forasiepi, A.M. and Novacek, M.J. 2007. New Jurassic mammals from Patagonia, Argentina: A reappraisal of australosphenidan morphology and interrelationships. American Museum Novitates 3566:1–54.
- Sigogneau-Russell, D., Hooker, J.J. and Ensom, P.C. 2001. The oldest tribosphenic mammal from Laurasia (Purbeck Limestone Group, Berriasian, Cretaceous, UK) and its bearing on the 'dual origin' of Tribosphenida (subscription required). Comptes Rendus de l'Académie des Sciences, Series IIA (Earth and Planetary Science) 333(2):141–147.
- Woodburne, M.O. 2003. Monotremes as pretribosphenic mammals (subscription required). Journal of Mammalian Evolution 10(3):195–248.
- Woodburne, M.O., Rich, T.H. and Springer, M.S. 2003. The evolution of tribospheny and the antiquity of mammalian clades (subscription required). Molecular Phylogeny and Evolution 28:360–385.
