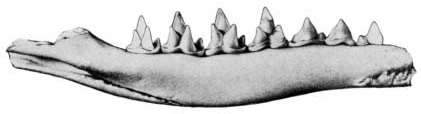

Scientific classification
- Kingdom: Animalia
- Phylum: Chordata
- Clade: Synapsida
- Clade: Therapsida
- Clade: Cynodontia
- Clade: Mammaliaformes
- Family: †Shuotheriidae
- Genus: †Shuotherium; Chow & Rich, 1982

Type species
- †Shuotherium dongi Chow & Rich, 1982

Species
- S. dongi Chow & Rich 1982; S. shilongi Wang, Clemens & Hu 1998

= Shuotherium =

Shuotherium Temporal range: 167.3–148.4 Ma Middle Jurassic-Late Jurassic

Extinct genus of mammaliaforms

Shuotherium is a fossil mammaliaform known from Middle-Late Jurassic of the Forest Marble Formation of England, and the Shaximiao Formation of Sichuan, China.

The original holotype is composed of a partial dentary and seven teeth (two which are incomplete). The holotypes for other species of this genus are solely represented by isolated molars. Shuotherium, along with Pseudotribos has been placed in the family Shuotheriidae as a sister taxon of the Australosphenida (see, Yinotheria), making it a relative of modern monotremes. However, some studies place it and other shuothereres as closer to therian mammals, and another outside Mammalia altogether.

== Description ==
In the lower molars, the talonid is situated in front of the trigonid, such a unique dental form is distinct from the typical tribosphenic pattern. In this "pseudotribosphenic" trait, the mesial cingulid is expanded to form a pseudotalonid, and its distal talonid is underdeveloped. It shares with Australosphenida a thin, slender lower jaw but differs from the non-monotreme Ausktribosphenida by having more developed postdentary trough. Its dental formula has been reconstructed as: p4, m3 (four premolars, three molars).

Kielan-Jaworowska, Cifelli & Luo 2002 had this to say regarding the fossil:

In our view, the most compelling evidence as to the affinities of Shuotherium lies in the structure of the last premolar, which shares striking similarities to that of Australosphenida

Lower molar structure of Shuotherium and Australosphenida is obviously quite different, and for this reason we do not place Shuotherium within this Gondwanan clade. Based on the limited evidence available, however, we suggest that Shuotherium is a viable sister-taxon to Australosphenida.
