= Jugulator amplissimus =

Jugulator amplissimus Temporal range: 105–94 Ma

Scientific classification
- Kingdom: Animalia
- Phylum: Chordata
- Class: Mammalia
- Order: †Eutriconodonta
- Family: †Triconodontidae
- Subfamily: †Alticonodontinae
- Genus: †Jugulator; Cifelli & Madsen, 1998
- Species: †J. amplissimus

Binomial name
- †Jugulator amplissimus Cifelli & Madsen, 1998

Extinct species of mammal

Jugulator is an extinct genus of mammals from the Cretaceous of North America. It contains one species, Jugulator amplissimus. A eutriconodont, it is known from the Cedar Mountain Formation, and is both a large sized and possibly ecologically specialised taxon, showcasing the diversity of mammals in the Mesozoic.

== Description ==
Jugulator is known primarily from isolated teeth and dentaries. The species is most distinctive in regards to its large size, being among the largest mammals in the region, some lower molars exceeding 5 mm in length and with an estimated body weight of about 750 g. The medial lower incisor is greatly enlarged, with a mitten-shaped crown that bears sharp cutting surfaces.

== Phylogeny ==
Always recognised as a triconodontid eutriconodont, the most recent phylogenetic studies recover Jugulator as the sister taxon of a clade comprising Volaticotherium, Ichthyoconodon, Triconolestes, and Argentoconodon, known as Volaticotherini.

Cladogram after Gaetano & Rougier, 2011:

- Triconodontidae
  - Priacodon
  - - Triconodon
    - - Trioracodon
      - Alticonodontinae
        - Arundelconodon
        - - - Meiconodon
            - - Astroconodon
              - - Alticonodon
                - Corviconodon
          - - Jugulator
            - Volaticotherini
              - Ichthyoconodon
              - - Argentoconodon
                - Volaticotherium

== Biology ==
Jugulator is noted as being a rather large mammal for Mesozoic standards. Combined with the general adaptations for carnivory that eutriconodonts display, it is safe to say that it was a predator of other vertebrates like mammals, lizards and small dinosaurs. Other large eutriconodonts like Repenomamus and Gobiconodon show evidence of scavenging and direct predation on such creatures, so it is likely that Jugulator also displayed these behaviours.

== Ecology ==
Jugulator occurs in the mid-Cretaceous deposits of the Cedar Mountain Formation, where several of North America's more iconic dinosaurs like Utahraptor and Cedarosaurus occur. A large variety of mammal species are known from here as well, including other eutriconodonts like Astroconodon and Corviconodon as well as multituberculates like Cedaromys and Janumys and several therian mammals such as Montanalestes and Atokatheridium. These diverse mammal faunas offer a transition from dominant taxa in the Early Cretaceous and the multituberculate and therian dominated laurasian mammalian faunas of the Late Cretaceous.
