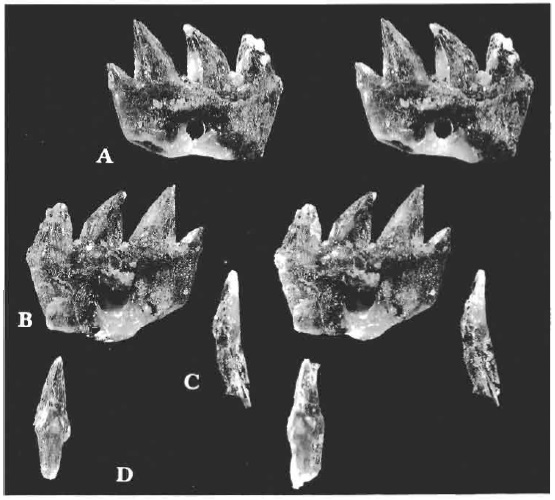
- Holotype lower right molar seen from four different angles

Scientific classification
- Kingdom: Animalia
- Phylum: Chordata
- Class: Mammalia
- Order: †Eutriconodonta
- Clade: †Volaticotherini
- Genus: †Ichthyoconodon; Sigogneau-Russell, 1995
- Species: †I. jaworowskorum

Binomial name
- †Ichthyoconodon jaworowskorum Sigogneau-Russell, 1995

= Ichthyoconodon =

Ichthyoconodon Temporal range: Early Cretaceous, Berriasian

Extinct family of mammals

Ichthyoconodon is an extinct genus of eutriconodont mammal from the Lower Cretaceous of Morocco. It is notable for having been found in a unique marine location, and the shape of its teeth suggests an unusual, potentially fish-eating ecological niche. Analysis suggests it is part of a group of gliding mammals that includes Volaticotherium.

== Description ==
Ichthyoconodon is only known from two molar teeth from Anoual Syncline sediments of Morocco, in the Ksar Metlili Formation which dates to the Berriasian. These teeth possess characteristics associated with volaticotherian eutriconodontan mammals. The molars are only around 4 millimeters long, a size comparable to the related species Jugulator. They are compressed into blade-like shape, and arranged in a line, with a slight recurve, similar to other animals in this group such as Argentoconodon.

== Etymology ==
Ichthyoconodon essentially means "fish cone tooth", from the Greek ιχθυς, "fish", κῶνος, "cone", and ὀδών, "tooth". The type species, I. jaworowskorum, was named "in honour of Zofia Kielan-Jaworowska and Zbigniew Jaworowski for their generous hospitality on many occasions".

== Relationships ==
Ichthyoconodon has been found to be a eutriconodontan mammal, despite there only being two molar teeth. although some authors have been skeptical of this interpretation. Other possibilities for the identity of these teeth have included pterosaur, dinosaur, and shark, but there has been no supporting evidence to date. Phylogenetic analysis favours the interpretation of these teeth as mammalian, and they are similar to the lower teeth of other mammals in Volaticotherini.

Phylogenetic studies find a close relationship with Volaticotherium, Jugulator, Triconolestes and Argentoconodon, within Volaticotheria.

== Ecology ==
Ichthyoconodon's teeth were found in marine deposits, alongside taxa like hybodontid sharks, ornithocheirid pterosaurs, ray-finned fish and sea turtles, as well as several terrestrial taxa like theropods. Unlike other mammal teeth, including other contemporary teeth such as those of Hahnodon, which show some degree of degradation, Ichthyoconodon teeth are not significantly modified, suggesting that the mammal either died in situ or was only carried over for a short distance under water.

Because the teeth of Ichthyoconodon are rather sharp and convergent in some details to the teeth of piscivorous mammals like otters and seals, some researchers have suggested that it may have fed on fish. There is no evidence for an aquatic lifestyle, other than the location the fossil were found. However there were freshwater semi-aquatic mammals in the Mesozoic, including the Jurassic and Cretaceous docodonts like Castorocauda and Haldanodon, Early Cretaceous monotremes and the Late Cretaceous Didelphodon. Ichthyoconodon and Dyskritodon amazighi are the only Mesozoic mammals so far to have been suggested to have possibly foraged in the sea. Researchers such as Zofia Kielan-Jaworowska pointed out lack of functional comparison between eutriconodont teeth and those of marine mammals. Unlike the teeth of seals and cetaceans, eutriconodont molars occlude, creating a shearing motion like carnassials, and unlike the grasping function of marine mammal molars.

It is possible that Ichthyoconodon may have been a gliding mammal, based on its relationship with the other gliding mammals like Volaticotherium. The presence of Argentoconodon in South America, Volaticotherium in Asia and Ichthyoconodon in North Africa in such a relatively close span of time suggests there may have been a widespread clade of Jurassic-Early Cretaceous gliding triconodonts.
