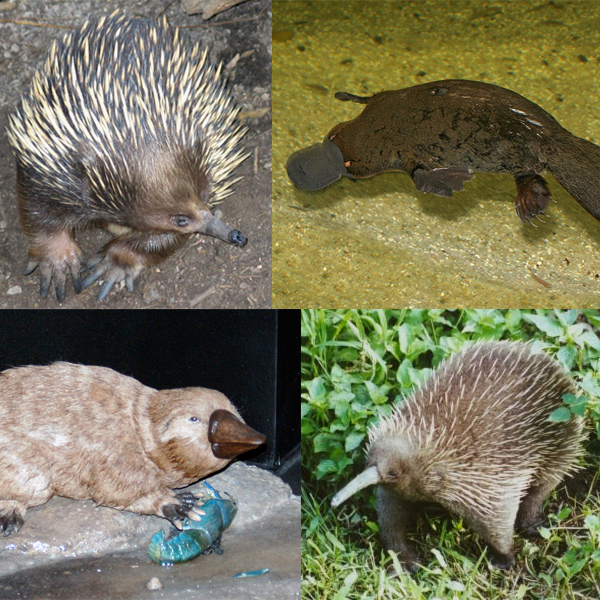

Scientific classification
- Kingdom: Animalia
- Phylum: Chordata
- Class: Mammalia
- Subclass: Prototheria; Gill, 1872

Groups included
- Monotremata; †Morganucodonta; †Docodonta; †Triconodonta; †Allotheria

Cladistically included but traditionally excluded taxa
- Theriimorpha; †Haramiyida

= Prototheria =

Prototherians Temporal range: Late Triassic–Recent

Subclass of mammalia

Prototheria (/ˌproʊtəˈθɪəriə, -toʊ-/, PROH-toh-THEER-ee-ə; from Ancient Greek πρώτος prṓtos "first" and θήρ thḗr "wild animal") is an obsolete subclass of mammals which includes the living Monotremata and to which a variety of extinct groups, including Morganucodonta, Docodonta, Triconodonta and Multituberculata, have also been assigned. It is today no longer considered a valid grouping, but rather a paraphyletic evolutionary grade of basal mammals and mammaliaform cynodonts.

Most of the animals in this group are extinct. The egg-laying monotremes are known from fossils of the Cretaceous and Cenozoic periods; they are represented today by the platypus and four species of echidna.

The names Prototheria, Metatheria, and Eutheria (loosely meaning "first beasts", "changed beasts", and "true beasts", respectively) refer to the three mammalian groupings of which we have living representatives. Each of the three may be defined as a total clade containing a living crown-group (respectively the Monotremata, Marsupialia and Placentalia) plus any fossil species which are more closely related to that crown-group than to any other living animals.

The threefold division of living mammals into monotremes, marsupials and placentals was already well established when Thomas Huxley proposed the names Metatheria and Eutheria to incorporate the two latter groups in 1880. Initially treated as subclasses, Metatheria and Eutheria are by convention now grouped as infraclasses of the subclass Theria, and in more recent proposals have been demoted further (to cohorts or even magnorders), as cladistic reappraisals of the relationships between living and fossil mammals have suggested that the Theria itself should be reduced in rank.

Prototheria, on the other hand, was generally recognised as a subclass until quite recently, on the basis of a hypothesis which defined the group by two supposed synapomorphies:

1. formation of the side wall of the braincase from a bone called the anterior lamina, contrasting with the alisphenoid in therians; and
2. a linear alignment of molar cusps, contrasting with a triangular arrangement in therians. These characters appeared to unite monotremes with a range of Mesozoic fossil orders (Morganucodonta, Docodonta, Triconodonta and Multituberculata) in a broader clade for which the name Prototheria was retained, and of which monotremes were thought to be only the last surviving branch.

The evidence which was held to support this grouping is now universally discounted. In the first place, examination of embryos has revealed that the development of the braincase wall is essentially identical in therians and in 'prototherians': the anterior lamina simply fuses with the alisphenoid in therians, and therefore the 'prototherian' condition of the braincase wall is primitive for all mammals while the therian condition can be derived from it. Additionally, the linear alignment of molar cusps is also primitive for all mammals. Therefore, neither of these states can supply a uniquely shared derived character which would support a 'prototherian' grouping of orders in contradistinction to Theria.

In a further reappraisal, the molars of embryonic and fossil monotremes (living monotreme adults are toothless) appear to demonstrate an ancestral pattern of cusps which is similar to the triangular arrangement observed in therians. Some peculiarities of this dentition support an alternative grouping of monotremes with certain recently discovered fossil forms into a proposed new clade known as the Australosphenida, and also suggest that the triangular array of cusps may have evolved independently in australosphenidans and therians.

The Australosphenida hypothesis remains controversial, and some taxonomists (e.g. McKenna & Bell 1997) prefer to maintain the name Prototheria as a fitting contrast to the other group of living mammals, the Theria. In theory, the Prototheria is taxonomically redundant, since Monotremata is currently the only order which can still be confidently included, but its retention might be justified if new fossil evidence, or a re-examination of known fossils, enables extinct relatives of the monotremes to be identified and placed within a wider grouping.
