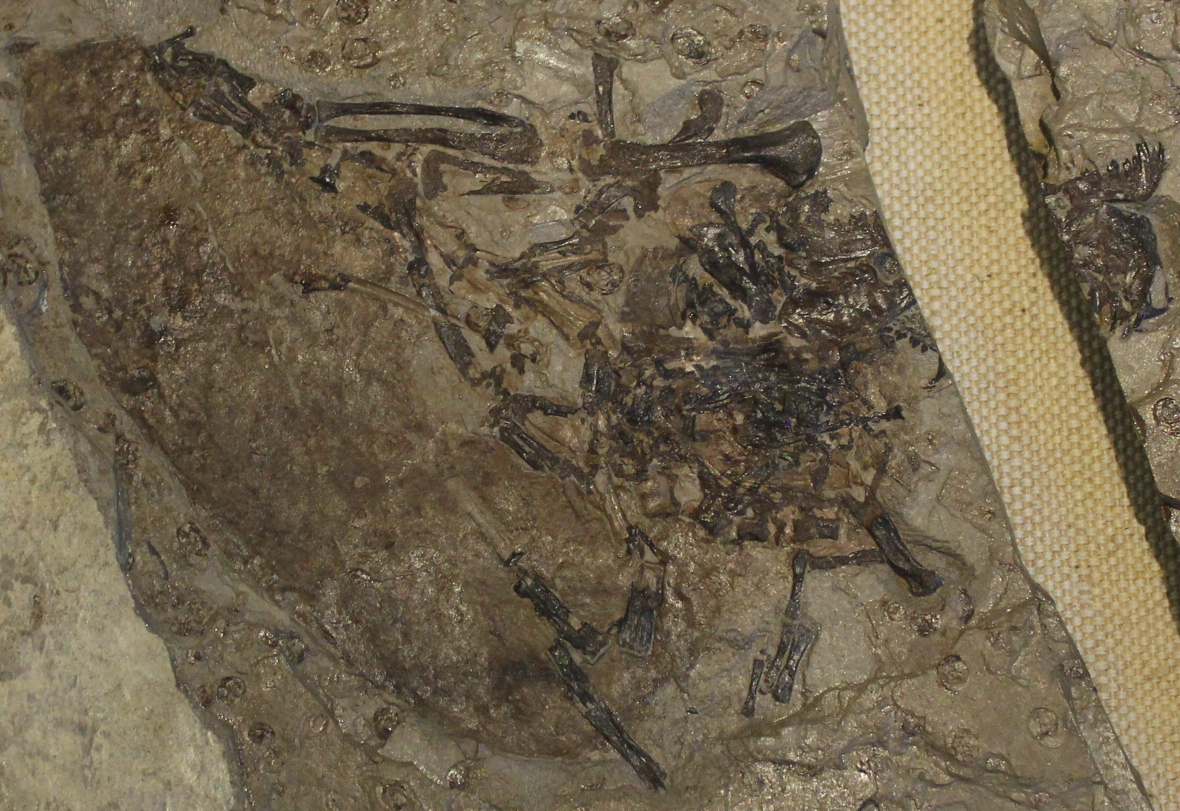
- Holotype of Volaticotherium

Scientific classification
- Kingdom: Animalia
- Phylum: Chordata
- Class: Mammalia
- Order: †Eutriconodonta
- Clade: †Volaticotherini; Meng et al., 2006

Type species
- †Volaticotherium antiquum Meng et al., 2006

Genera
- †Argentoconodon Rougier et al., 2007; †Ichthyoconodon Sigogneau-Russell, 1995; †Triconolestes Engelman and Callison 1998; †Volaticotherium Meng et al., 2006

= Volaticotherini =

Volaticotherini Temporal range: Toarcian–Berriasian

Extinct clade of mammals

Volaticotherini is a clade of eutriconodont mammals from the Mesozoic. In addition to the type genus Volaticotherium, it includes the genera Argentoconodon, Ichthyoconodon, and potentially Triconolestes.

Since most remains are primarily teeth, they are foremostly diagnosticated by their highly distinctive molars. However, the remains of one species, Volaticotherium antiquum, show that at least some members of this clade were capable of gliding. and Argentoconodon shares similar post-cranial features that also indicate aerial locomotion. As such, this clade contains some of the oldest known aerial mammals, alongside the various gliding haramiyidans.

== Definition ==
Volaticotherini is phylogenetically defined as the clade derived from the most recent common ancestor of Argentoconodon, Ichthyoconodon, and Volaticotherium.

== History ==
Ichthyoconodon was the first described member of this group, back in 1995, previously usually ranked among eutriconodonts, albeit tentatively due to its atypical teeth. Volaticotherium, described in 2006, provided a fairly complete skeleton and led to the erection of a distinct family, Volaticotheridae, and order, Volaticotheria, to house the genus, and allowed Ichthyoconodon to be recognized as a potential relative. Volaticotheria was considered the sister taxon of a clade comprising eutriconodonts, multituberculates, and trechnotheres. However, not long after, an eutriconodont identity was suspected, and Volaticotheria has since fallen into disuse.

Subsequent analyses have consistently recovered Argentoconodon as the sister taxon of Volaticotherium, with Ichthyoconodon as the sister taxon of that clade and thus the basalmost volaticotherin. The North American genus Jugulator may be the sister taxon of Volaticotherini. These were moved to the eutriconodont family Triconodontidae, as part of the alticonodontine assemblage, and the clade was renamed Volaticotherini accordingly. However, other sources consider the clade to be a separate family from Triconodontidae, as Volaticotheridae. This may be supported by other, more recent analyses, which find the clade to be more basally placed within Eutriconodonta.

== Characteristics ==
Since most volaticotherian remains are based on teeth, the diagnostic characteristic of the group is its molar morphology. Though classified as "triconodont" in shape, volaticotherian molars are highly atypical, possessing high, curved, backwards facing cusps aligned anteroposteriorly, lacking a cingulum. Canines and incisors tend to be fairly large.

In the two forms that do possess postcranial remains, Argentoconodon and Volaticotherium, we see a highly specialised femur, lacking a femoral neck.

Volaticotherium is rather well preserved, bearing a mostly complete skeleton and soft-tissue impressions such as hair and patagia.

=== Aerial locomotion ===
One genus of volaticotherin, Volaticotherium, has clear evidence of being capable of gliding. It was the first gliding Mesozoic mammal discovered and lived at least 70 million years before the appearance of the first flying and gliding therians. It preserved a large, fur-covered patagium, extending not only between the limbs and tail, but also to the digits, "sandwiching" them. The limbs were proportionally longer than those of other Mesozoic mammals, fitting the standards in flying and gliding mammals, and the femur is uniquely specialised, allowing the leg to be extended laterally and remain steady during gliding. The tail is dorsoventrally flattened, and supports evidence of uropatagia in at least the proximal vertebrae. Argentoconodon shares similar femur characteristics, suggesting that it too may have been capable of gliding.

== Distribution ==
Volaticotherini was a relatively widespread and long-lived clade, with occurrences known from the Toarcian of South America, Oxfordian of China, and Berriasian of Morocco. The presence of volaticotherins in Gondwana is unusual, as they are among the few known Gondwanan triconodonts (and, if aligned with triconodontids, the only representatives of the group in Gondwana), with Argentoconodon occurring as far back as the Early Jurassic in otherwise australosphenidan dominated faunas.

== Diet ==
Though highly unusual and possibly indicating atypical occlusion patterns, volaticotherian molars are thought to have had a shearing motion as in other eutriconodonts. Combined with long canines, this seems to indicate that, like their relatives, they were probably carnivorous. Ichthyoconodon was fairly large by Mesozoic mammal standards, and were probably capable of tackling vertebrate prey. In a study about Mesozoic mammal diets Argentoconodon ranks among carnivorous species, while Volaticotherium ranks among insectivorous taxa. This same result is provided almost identically in a posterior study, albeit with Volaticotherium closer to the carnivore space.

It has been noted that most gliding mammals are predominantly herbivorous, which would make volaticothere carnivory truly exceptional. In particular, Volaticotherium itself has been compared to insectivore bats.

== Paleoecology ==
Volaticotherins, as is typical for gliding animals, were adapted for an arboreal lifestyle. One volaticotherin, Ichthyoconodon, was recovered from marine facies and consequently initially interpreted as an aquatic animal. However, many terrestrial mammals are preserved in aquatic environments, so it is unclear how strong this evidence is regarding its life habits, though its teeth appear to not have undergone long aquatic transportation.
