= Cingulid =

Tooth present in some species of animals

A cingulid is a term used to describe the structure of some mammalian cheek teeth which refers to a ridge that runs around the base of the crown of a lower molar. The equivalent structure on upper molars is called the cingulum. The presence or absence of a cingulid is often a diagnostic feature for mammal remains.

Some animals don't have a cingulid. Those that do may have them on only some, or all of the teeth, though most often on the molar teeth. There are four common descriptions of the position of the cingulid:

- Lingual cingulid - a cingulid on the side of the tooth that is next to the tongue
- Labial cingulid - a cingulid on the side of the tooth that is next to the lips or cheeks
- Distal cingulid - a cingulid on the side of the tooth facing the tooth behind it in the jaw (can also be referred to as a posterior cingulid)
- Mesial cingulid - a cingulid on the side of the tooth facing the tooth in front of it in the jaw (can also be referred to as an anterior cingulid)
