= Argentoconodon =

Argentoconodon Temporal range: Middle Toarcian ~179.17–178.07 Ma

Scientific classification
- Kingdom: Animalia
- Phylum: Chordata
- Class: Mammalia
- Order: †Eutriconodonta
- Clade: †Volaticotherini
- Genus: †Argentoconodon; Rougier et al. 2007
- Species: †A. fariasorum

Binomial name
- †Argentoconodon fariasorum Rougier et al. 2007

Extinct family of mammals

Argentoconodon (meaning "Argentina cone tooth") is an extinct genus of theriimorph mammal from the Cañadón Asfalto Formation of the Cañadón Asfalto Basin in Patagonia. When originally described, it was known only from a single molariform tooth, which possessed a combination of primitive and derived features. The tooth is currently held in the Museo Paleontológico Egidio Feruglio, where it was given the specimen number MPEF-PV 1877. New material described in 2011 show that Argentoconodon was similar to Ichthyoconodon, Jugulator and Volaticotherium within the family Triconodontidae, and possibly also Triconolestes.

== Aerial locomotion ==
Several postcranial similarities to Volaticotherium suggest that Argentoconodon was capable of gliding. In particular, its femur shares the same shape and proportions as its more complete relative, being highly specialised and without a femoral head, being less competent in rotational movement but more useful in extending the leg and resisting flight stresses.

Argentoconodon's spatio-temporal distribution has been noted as being unusual, in that it is not only a rare Early Jurassic eutriconodont, but also one of the only two South American members of this group, the other being the slightly younger Condorodon; other mammals in the Cañadon Asfalto Formation are various australosphenidans and a putative allothere. This has been considered worthy of interest in the future.

== Diet ==
Like most eutriconodonts Argentoconodon was most likely animalivorous, its molars adapted to shear. In a study detailing Mesozoic mammal diets it ranks among carnivorous species. This is further corroborated by another study on Mesozoic mammal mandibles, where in plots among carnivorous rather than insectivorous taxa.
