= Ausktribosphenidae =

Ausktribosphenidae Temporal range: Early Cretaceous

Scientific classification
- Kingdom: Animalia
- Phylum: Chordata
- Class: Mammalia
- Clade: Australosphenida
- Family: †Ausktribosphenidae; Rich et al., 1997

Genera
- †Ausktribosphenos; †Bishops; †Kryoparvus?

Extinct family of mammals

Ausktribosphenidae is an extinct family of australosphenidan mammals from the Early Cretaceous of Australia and mid Cretaceous of South America.

== Classification and taxonomy ==
Ausktribosphenidae is closely related to monotremes and hence the two form the yinotherian clade Australosphenida. It includes two species, Ausktribosphenos nyktos and Bishops whitmorei, both of which are known only from skull and jaw fragments.

== Morphology ==
Like other Australosphenida, ausktribosphenids have tribosphenic molars.

== Distribution ==
Given that Ausktribosphenidae has been found in Early Cretaceous deposits in Australia, its occurrence has ramifications for knowledge of early monotreme paleobiogeography because Australia was connected only to Antarctica, and placentals originated in the northern hemisphere and were confined to it until continental drift formed land connections from North America to South America, from Asia to Africa and from Asia to India. The late Cretaceous map shows how the southern continents are separated. However, the cladistic analysis of Cifelliodon recovers Fruitafossor as a monotreme relative, suggesting that yinotherians may have originated in the Northern Hemisphere. Remains similar to Bishops are known from the mid Cretaceous Mata Amarilla Formation of Argentina, suggesting faunal interchange.
