= Triconolestes =

Triconolestes Temporal range: Late Jurassic

Scientific classification
- Domain: Eukaryota
- Kingdom: Animalia
- Phylum: Chordata
- Class: Mammalia
- Order: †Eutriconodonta
- Genus: †Triconolestes; Engelmann and Callison, 1998
- Species: †T. curvicuspis

Binomial name
- †Triconolestes curvicuspis Engelmann and Callison, 1998

Extinct family of mammals

Triconolestes is an extinct genus of Late Jurassic eutriconodont mammal from the Morrison Formation, present in stratigraphic zones 4. Known from only a single molar, it is a small mammal typically considered an amphilestid. However, it has also been compared to Argentoconodon, which has been considered a volaticothere related to gliding mammals such as Volaticotherium and Ichthyoconodon.

== See also ==
- List of prehistoric mammals
- Paleobiota of the Morrison Formation
