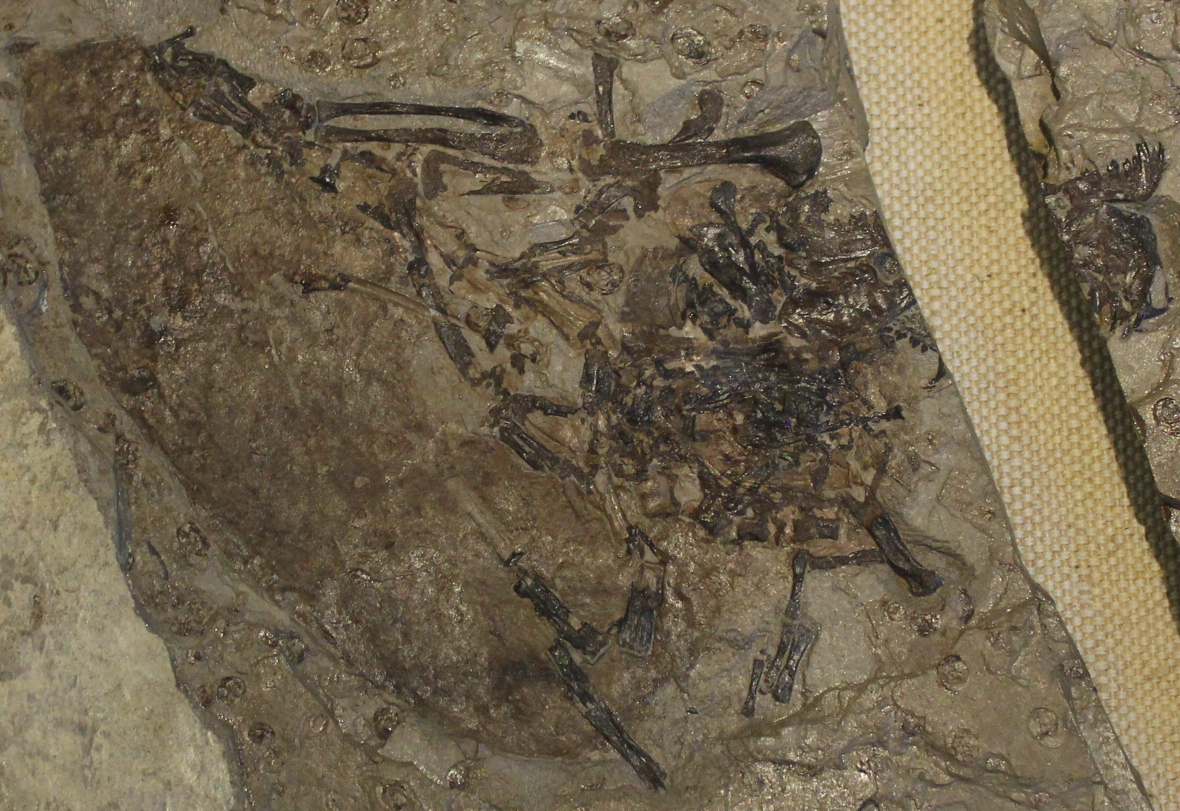
- Holotype, Paleozoological Museum of China

Scientific classification
- Kingdom: Animalia
- Phylum: Chordata
- Class: Mammalia
- Order: †Eutriconodonta
- Clade: †Volaticotherini
- Genus: †Volaticotherium; Meng et al., 2006

Type species
- †Volaticotherium antiquum Meng et al., 2006

= Volaticotherium =

Volaticotherium Temporal range: Middle Jurassic, 164 Ma

Extinct family of mammals

Volaticotherium antiquum (meaning "ancient gliding beast") is an extinct, gliding, insectivorous mammal that lived in Asia during the Jurassic period, around 164 mya. It is the only member of the genus Volaticotherium.

The discovery of Volaticotherium provided the earliest-known record of a gliding mammal (70 million years older than the next oldest example), until the discovery of the contemporary haramiyidans Maiopatagium, Vilevolodon and Xianshou, and provided further evidence of mammalian diversity during the Mesozoic Era. The closely related and significantly older Argentoconodon shows similar post-cranial adaptations for aerial locomotion also seen in Volaticotherium.

== Discovery ==
The only known fossil of Volaticotherium was recovered from the Daohugou Beds of Ningcheng County, Inner Mongolia, China. The age of the Daohugou Beds is currently uncertain and the subject of debate, but most studies suggest an age of around 164 plus or minus 4 million years ago. The description was published in an issue of the journal Nature.

== Description ==
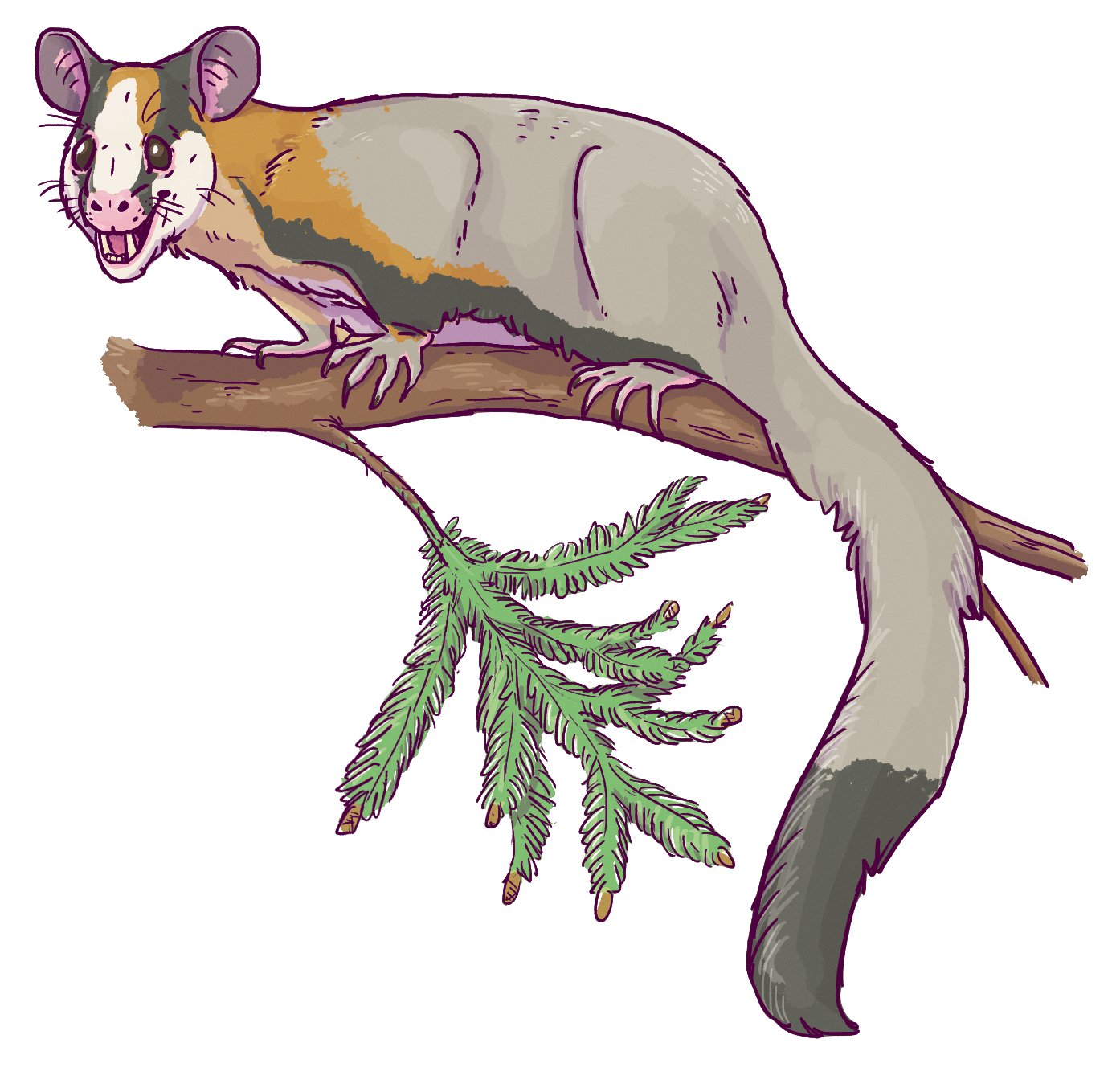
Life restoration

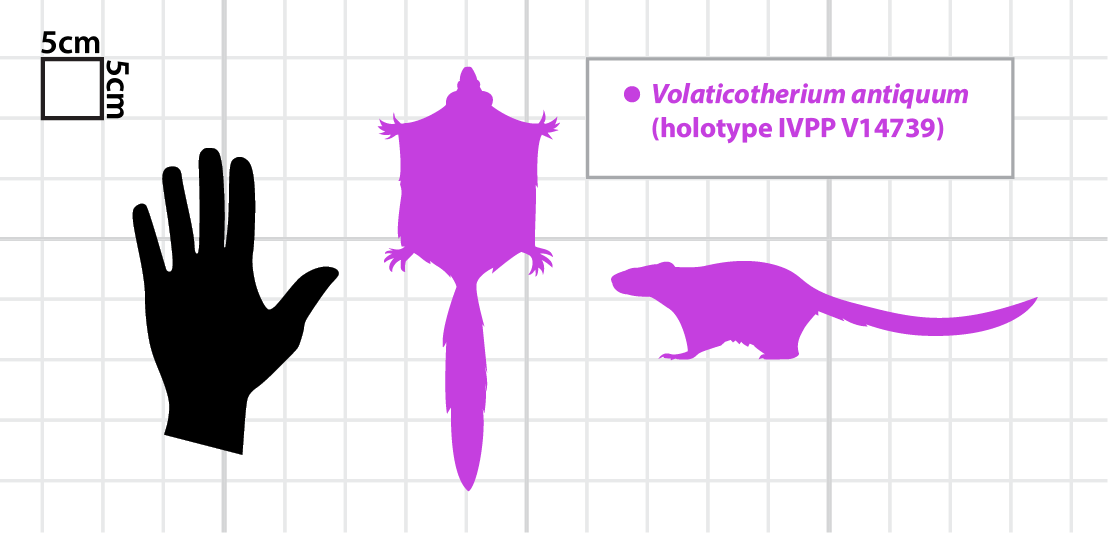
Size comparison

Volaticotherium had a gliding membrane, sometimes compared to modern-day flying squirrel, that extended not just between the limbs and at least the tail base, but also the digits, "sandwiching" them. It was densely covered by fur. The tail was flat, increasing the airfoil, and the limbs were proportionally long, comparable to those of modern flying and gliding mammals. The toes were grasping, as typical for arboreal mammals; the hand, however, was poorly preserved and its anatomy is therefore unclear. The teeth of Volaticotherium were highly unusual, possessing long, curved, backwards-pointing cusps, possibly used for shearing; this, combined with the long canines, indicates a carnivorous diet, which at its small size was probably composed of insects. This is supported by a study ranking it among insectivorous taxa, while the related Argentoconodon ranked in carnivorous taxa. It has been noted that most gliding mammals are predominantly herbivorous, which would make volaticothere carnivory truly exceptional. In particular, Volaticotherium itself has been compared to insectivorous bats, and its femur has unique adaptations among mammals that make it resistant to flight stresses, and render terrestrial locomotion cumbersome.

== Classification ==
The phylogenetic analysis conducted by the authors of the description of Volaticotherium antiquum recovered it as the sister taxon of the clade that contained, among other taxa, eutriconodonts, multituberculates, spalacotheriid and tinodontid "symmetrodontans", dryolestids, metatherians (including marsupials) and eutherians (including placental mammals). As the analysis did not place Volaticotherium within any of the previously known main groups of Mesozoic mammals, the authors of its description erected a separate family Volaticotheriidae and order Volaticotheria for it. However, Zhe-Xi Luo (2007) mentioned that Volaticotherium might actually be a eutriconodont. This was eventually confirmed by the phylogenetic analyses conducted by Leandro C. Gaetano and Guillermo W. Rougier (2011, 2012); these analyses recovered Volaticotherium antiquum as a eutriconodont that belonged to the family Triconodontidae and subfamily Alticonodontinae, and was particularly closely related to the genera Argentoconodon and Ichthyoconodon, and possibly Triconolestes. More recent studies keep this relationship, but move Volaticotherium, Argentoconodon, Ichthyoconodon and Jugulator (and, possibly by association, Triconolestes) in a more basal position among triconodontids, away from alticonodontines.
