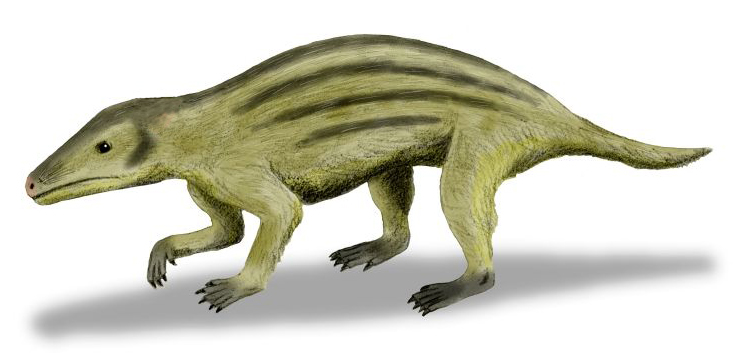
- Life restoration of Pseudotribos

Scientific classification
- Kingdom: Animalia
- Phylum: Chordata
- Clade: Synapsida
- Clade: Therapsida
- Clade: Cynodontia
- Clade: Mammaliaformes
- Family: †Shuotheriidae
- Genus: †Pseudotribos; Luo et al., 2007
- Species: †P. robustus

Binomial name
- †Pseudotribos robustus Luo et al., 2007

= Pseudotribos =

Pseudotribos Temporal range: Middle Jurassic

Extinct genus of mammaliaformss

Pseudotribos ("false chewing") is an extinct genus of mammaliaform that lived in Northern China during the Middle Jurassic some 165 million years ago, possibly more closely related to monotremes than to theria (placental and marsupial mammals), although other studies indicate that these shuotheres are closer to therians than to monotremes. The only known specimen was found in the Daohugou Bed in Inner Mongolia (41.3°N 119.2°E: paleocoordinates 42.6°N 122.4°E).
