= Henosferidae =

Henosferidae Temporal range: Toarcian-Bathonian 179–166 Ma

Scientific classification
- Domain: Eukaryota
- Kingdom: Animalia
- Phylum: Chordata
- Class: Mammalia
- Clade: Australosphenida
- Family: †Henosferidae; Rougier, Marinelli, Forasiepi & Novacek, 2007

Genera
- †Ambondro?; †Asfaltomylos; †Henosferus

Extinct family of mammaliaforms

Henosferidae (also spelled "Henospheridae") is an extinct family of Australosphenida, native to Gondwana during the Early-Middle Jurassic. It is defined as a clade including the most recent common ancestor of Henosferus and Asfaltomylos and all its descendants.
