= Asfaltomylos =

Asfaltomylos Temporal range: Middle Toarcian ~179.17–178.07 Ma

Scientific classification
- Kingdom: Animalia
- Phylum: Chordata
- Class: Mammalia
- Clade: Australosphenida
- Family: †Henosferidae
- Genus: †Asfaltomylos; Rauhut et al. 2002
- Species: †A. patagonicus

Binomial name
- †Asfaltomylos patagonicus Rauhut et al. 2002

Extinct family of mammals

Asfaltomylos is an extinct genus of the primitive mammal subclass Australosphenida from the Jurassic of Argentina. The type and only species is Asfaltomylos patagonicus, recovered from and named after the Cañadón Asfalto Formation, Cañadón Asfalto Basin of Chubut Province, Patagonia.

== See also ==
- Argentoconodon
- Condorodon
- Henosferus
