= Ausktribosphenos =

Ausktribosphenos Temporal range: Early Cretaceous121–113 Ma

Scientific classification
- Domain: Eukaryota
- Kingdom: Animalia
- Phylum: Chordata
- Class: Mammalia
- Clade: Australosphenida
- Family: †Ausktribosphenidae
- Genus: †Ausktribosphenos; Rich et al., 1997
- Species: †A. nyktos

Binomial name
- †Ausktribosphenos nyktos Rich et al, 1997

Extinct genus of mammals

Ausktribosphenos is an extinct genus of mammals from the Early Cretaceous of Australia, sometime between 121 - 113 Ma during the Aptian. The only recorded species, Ausktribosphenos nyktos, was found on Flat Rocks in the Wonthaggi Formation, Victoria.

== Discovery and naming ==
The holotype fossil of Ausktribosphenos was found in the Shore platform at Flat Rocks, Bunarong Marine Park, Victoria, Southeastern Australia, and described in 1997.

The generic name Ausktribosphenos derives from the place name Australia, where the fossils were found; and the English word Tribosphenic, which further derives from the Greek words tribeo, to mean "rub"; and sphḗn, to mean "wedge", in reference to the shape of the teeth. The specific name nyktos derives from the name of the Greek god Nyx, which further derives from the Greek word Núx, to mean "night", in reference to the fact that the polar region of the world Ausktribosphenos lived in would have prolonged nights, and 3 months of perpetual darkness.

The whole meaning of the name is "The Australian Cretaceous tribosphenic mammal that lived by night".

== Description ==
The lower jaw of Ausktribosphenos is roughly 16 mm (0.6 in) in length, with a proposed length of around 85 mm (3.3 in) for the entire animal. Due to all the distinct differences and similarities seen in the fossil material of Ausktribosphenos from other Cretaceous mammals, from the shape of the jaw itself down to the teeth, it was placed into the Mammalia class, but put into its own family, the Ausktribosphenidae.
