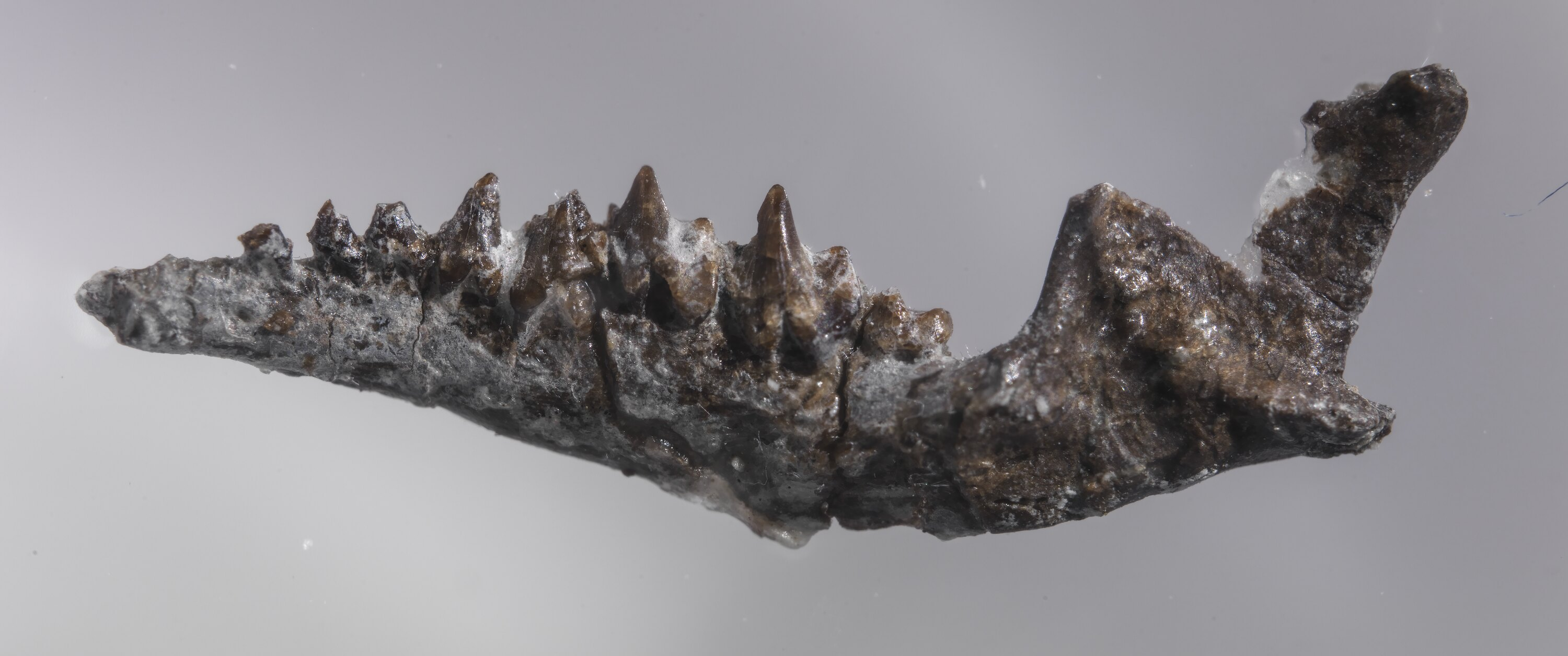

Scientific classification
- Kingdom: Animalia
- Phylum: Chordata
- Class: Mammalia
- Clade: Australosphenida
- Family: †Ausktribosphenidae
- Genus: †Bishops; Rich et al., 2001
- Species: †B. whitmorei

Binomial name
- †Bishops whitmorei Rich et al., 2001

= Bishops whitmorei =

Bishops whitmorei Temporal range: Early Cretaceous

Extinct family of mammals

Bishops is an extinct genus of mammals from Early Cretaceous of Australia. The only recorded species, Bishops whitmorei, was found on Flat Rocks, Wonthaggi Formation, Victoria. The genus was named in honour of Dr Barry Bishop, the former chairman of the Committee for Research and Exploration, National Geographic Society.
