= Henosferus =

Henosferus Temporal range: Middle Toarcian ~179.17–178.07 Ma

Scientific classification
- Kingdom: Animalia
- Phylum: Chordata
- Class: Mammalia
- Clade: Australosphenida
- Family: †Henosferidae
- Genus: †Henosferus; Rougier et al. 2007
- Species: †H. molus

Binomial name
- †Henosferus molus Rougier et al. 2007

Extinct family of mammals

Henosferus is an extinct genus of australosphenidan mammal from Lower Jurassic of Argentina. The only recorded species, Henosferus molus, was found in the Cañadón Asfalto Formation of the Cañadón Asfalto Basin in Chubut Province, Patagonia.
