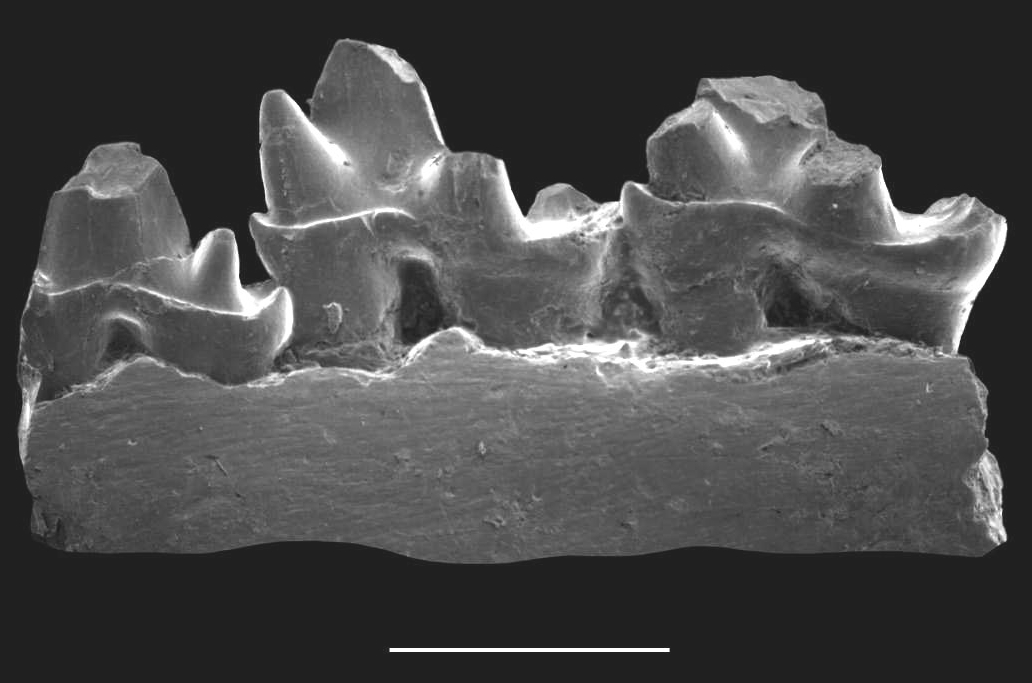
- Jaw fragment of Ambondro mahabo

Scientific classification
- Kingdom: Animalia
- Phylum: Chordata
- Class: Mammalia
- Clade: Australosphenida; Luo, Cifelli, & Kielan-Jaworowska, 2001

Taxa
- †Ausktribosphenidae; †Bishopidae; †Henosferidae; ?Monotremata; And see text

= Australosphenida =

Australosphenida Temporal range: Middle Jurassic–Cenomanian

Subclass of mammals

The Australosphenida are a clade of mammals, containing mammals with tribosphenic molars, known from the Jurassic to Mid-Cretaceous of Gondwana. In tribosphenic teeth, the lower molar is divided into two regions: the three-cusped trigonid, or shearing end, and the talonid, or crushing heel. Although they have often been suggested to have acquired tribosphenic molars independently from those of Tribosphenida, this has been disputed. Fossils of australosphenidans have been found from the Jurassic of Madagascar and Argentina, and Cretaceous of Australia and Argentina. Monotremes have also been considered a part of this group in its original definition and in many subsequent studies, but its relationship with other members has been disputed by some scholars.

== Taxonomy ==
This grouping includes the following taxa:

- †Henosferidae, including the genera Ambondro, Asfaltomylos, and Henosferus from the Jurassic of Argentina and Madagascar.
- †Ausktribosphenidae known from the Early Cretaceous of Australia
- †Bishopidae including Bishops from the Lower Cretaceous of Australia and an unnamed genus from the Mid-Cretaceous of Argentina (the latter of which was originally attributed to Ausktribosphenidae).
- †?Vincelestes, sometimes recovered as an australosphenidan (when not inversely considered a cladotherian).
- †?Tendagurutherium, recovered as an australosphenidan in one study.
- ?Monotremata, one of the three major living groups of mammals, known from the Early Cretaceous to present of Australia-New Guinea and the Late Cretaceous-Paleocene of southern South America.

The grouping embodies a hypothesis about the evolution of molar teeth in mammals. Living monotremes are toothless as adults, but the juvenile platypus, fossil monotremes and Ausktribosphenida all share a pattern of three molar cusps arranged in a triangle or V shape, which is known as the tribosphenic type of molar.

Monotremes were historically classified within the clade Prototheria, alongside morganucodontids, docodonts, triconodonts and multituberculates, however it is now widely recognised that this grouping is a paraphyletic grade and that these groups do not share a close relationship. In 2001, Luo et al. proposed the clade Australosphenida to include monotremes as well as Jurassic and Cretaceous mammals with tribosphenic molars known from the Southern Hemisphere, based almost exclusively on characters of the skull and lower jaws.

Cladogram after Luo et al. 2001:

- Basal mammaliaforms
- Mammalia
  - - Shuotherium
    - Australosphenida
      - Ambondro
      - Steropodon (Monotremata)
      - Ausktribosphenos
  - - Eutriconodonta
    - - Zhangheotherium
      - - Henkelotherium (Dryolestida)
        - - Peramus
          - Boreosphenida
            - Kielantherium
            - Theria
              - Eutheria
              - Metatheria

According to Luo et al., tribosphenic molars were evolved by the Australosphenida independently of the true Tribosphenida, or Boreosphenida (that is, the therians and their relatives) in the northern continents. Others contend that the ausktribosphenids (two families of the Australian Cretaceous tribosphenids) in fact belong to the placentals and were therefore true tribosphenids, but unrelated to the ancestry of the monotremes.

Most recent phylogenetic studies lump henosferids and aukstribosphenids alongside monotremes. However, a 2022 review of monotreme evolution noted that the most primitive monotreme Teinolophos differed substantially from other non-monotreme Australosphenidans, having five molars as opposed to three in all other non-monotreme australosphenidans, and having non-tribosphenic molars, meaning that monotremes and non-monotreme australosphenidans were likely unrelated. Later, Flannery and coauthors suggested that the core grouping of australosphenidans (excluding monotremes) were actually stem-therians as members of Tribosphenida, with the group representing a paraphyletic grade, with Bishopidae more closely related to Theria than to other australosphenidans.
