= Mawson Formation =

Geological formation in Antarctica

- Stratigraphic range: Toarcian; ~182–177 Ma
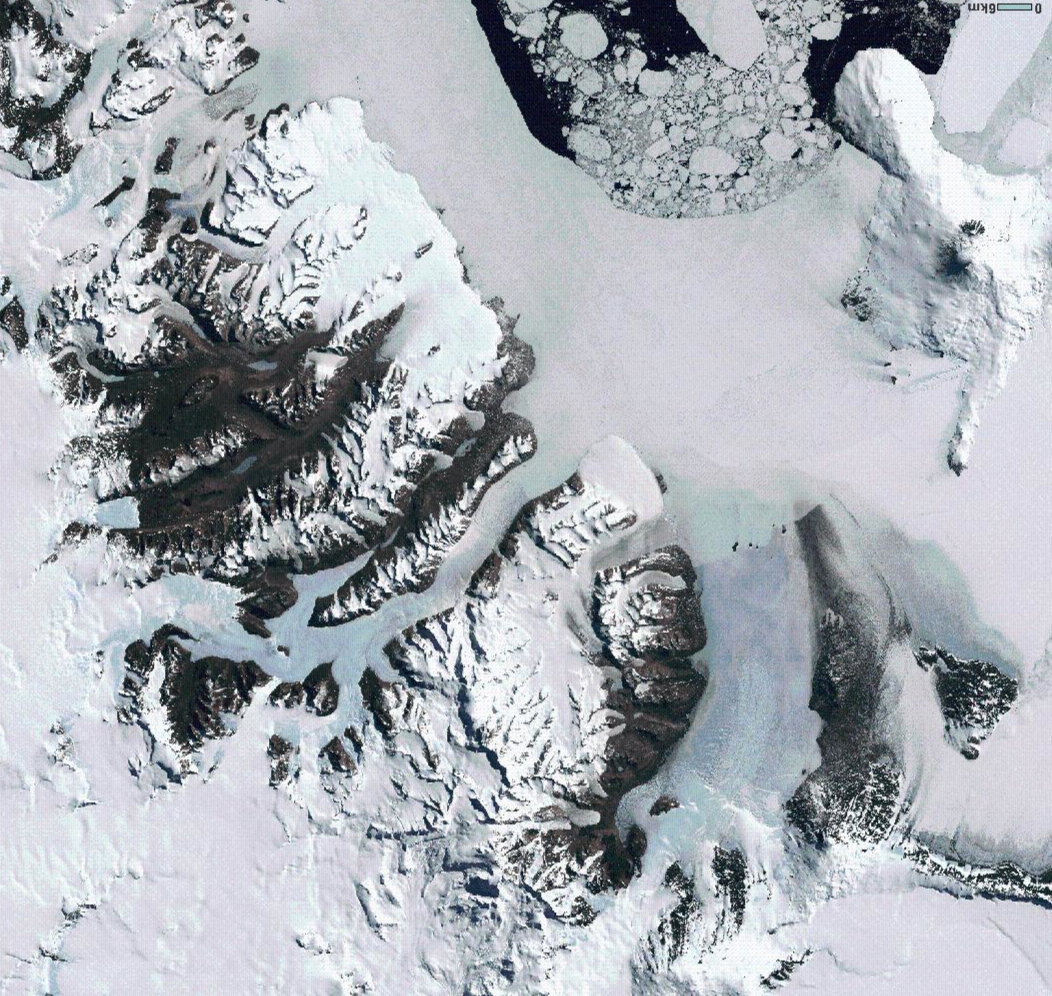
- South Victoria Land, including the main outcrop of the Formation, the Carapace Nunantak, that is located at the NW
- Type: Geological formation
- Unit of: Ferrar Large Igneous Province
- Sub-units: Carapace Sandstone Member
- Underlies: Kirkpatrick Basalt (In part)
- Overlies: Lashly Formation
- Area: 28.5 km²
- Thickness: Up to 400 m

Lithology
- Primary: Volcaniclastic mudstone
- Other: Volcaniclastic gray & blue mudstone

Location
- Coordinates: 76.9°S 159.4°E
- Approximate paleocoordinates: 60.1°S 46.5°E
- Region: South Victoria Land
- Country: Ross Dependency
- Extent: Unknown

Type section
- Named for: Mawson Peak
- Named by: Ballance and Watters, 1971
- Mawson Formation (Antarctica)

The Mawson Formation is a geological formation in Antarctica, dating to roughly between 182 and 177 million years ago and covering the Toarcian stages of the Jurassic Period in the Mesozoic Era. Vertebrate remains are known from the formation. The Mawson Formation is the South Victoria Land in the Ross Dependency equivalent of the Karoo Large Igneous Province in South Africa (including the upper Clarens Formation desertic interbeds), as well the Lonco Trapial Formation and the Cañadón Asfalto Formation of Argentina. The Volcanic material was likely sourced from the Antarctic Peninsula's Ellsworth Land Volcanic Group.

== Geology ==
The thin lacustrine interbeds of the Mawson Formation have received several names in literature, being known as either Carapace Sandstone or Carapace Formation, being a series of Freshwater environments developed during times when the Kirkpatrick Basalt stopped invading the zone. The lava flow deposits of the Kirkpatrick Basalt belong to the Ferrar Large Igneous Province, developed in a linear belt along the Transantarctic Mountains, from the Weddell Sea region to North Victoria Land, covering approx. 3,500 km in length. This event was linked with the initial stages of the breakup of the Gondwanan part of Pangea, concretely with the rifting of East Antarctica and Southern Africa, developing a magmatic flow controlled by an Early Jurassic zone of extension related to a triple junction in the proto-Weddell Sea region at approximately 55°S. This eruptions phase includes the Dufek Intrusion, the Ferrar Dolerite sills and dikes, extrusive rocks consisting of pyroclastic strata, and the Kirkpatrick Basalt lava flows, with a total thickness variable, but exceeding 2 km in some places. This Volcanism is not limited to the Antarctica, as it was recorded also in Tasmania and New Zealand, suggesting that these area where connected back then. The Paleovulcanology analysis of the Mawson Formation have recovered Permian and Triassic material, which was eroded by lavas, with the presence of tachylite pyroclasts that imply rapid cooling by interaction with water.

== Paleoenvironment ==
The Mawson Formation was described originally subdivided in two sections, that where identified as separate units. This, is due to a clear differentiation of two kinds of deposits: the so-called "Mawson Tuffs", representing lithified pyroclastic material and the "Carapace sandstones", alluvial/lacustrine, both deposited in a setting defined by Ballance and Watters (1971) as composed by "shallow, northeast flowing, ephemeral streams on a subsiding alluvial plain". The Mawson Formation was thus, heavily influenced by vulcanism, with tuff breccia deposits dropped in a <100 m paleotopography valley in Coombs Hills, probably reduced from previous erosion events, while at Allan Hills a paleovalley of up to 500 m was present. In this paleovalleys, massive production and accumulation of volcanic lahars in lowlands occur, in a similar way to more recent ones of places such as Osceola Mudflow at Mount Rainier. Over this pyroclastic sequences, lacustrine beds developed temporally. Thus, beyond alluvial settings, ancient lakes, with hydrothermal influence, where developed and latter basaltically surrounded thanks to the relationships with the overliying Kirckpatrick Basalt. This deposits mark the locally known "Mawson Time", a section of the sedimentological evolution of the Ferrar Range, where volcanic material deposited in Allan Hills and Coombs Hills, while the Carapace Sandstones hosted an alluvial plain that recovered all the volcanic detritus, being latter flooded and developing a lacustrine ecosystem. The described lacustrine system was, like the "Chacritas Paleolake" of the sister Cañadón Asfalto Formation in Patagonia, developed following the local rift in a similar way to the modern Lake Magadi in the Kenyan Rift Valley, as proven by the discovery of Chert like the one found in this african lake, what suggest that both, Carapace and Chacritas where likely alkaline lakes that had notorious influence of hydrothermal fuids. Other more recent lacustrine/fluvial sequences have been described in new outcrops, like at Suture Bench and SW Gair Mesa, with abundant invertebrate and plant fossils.

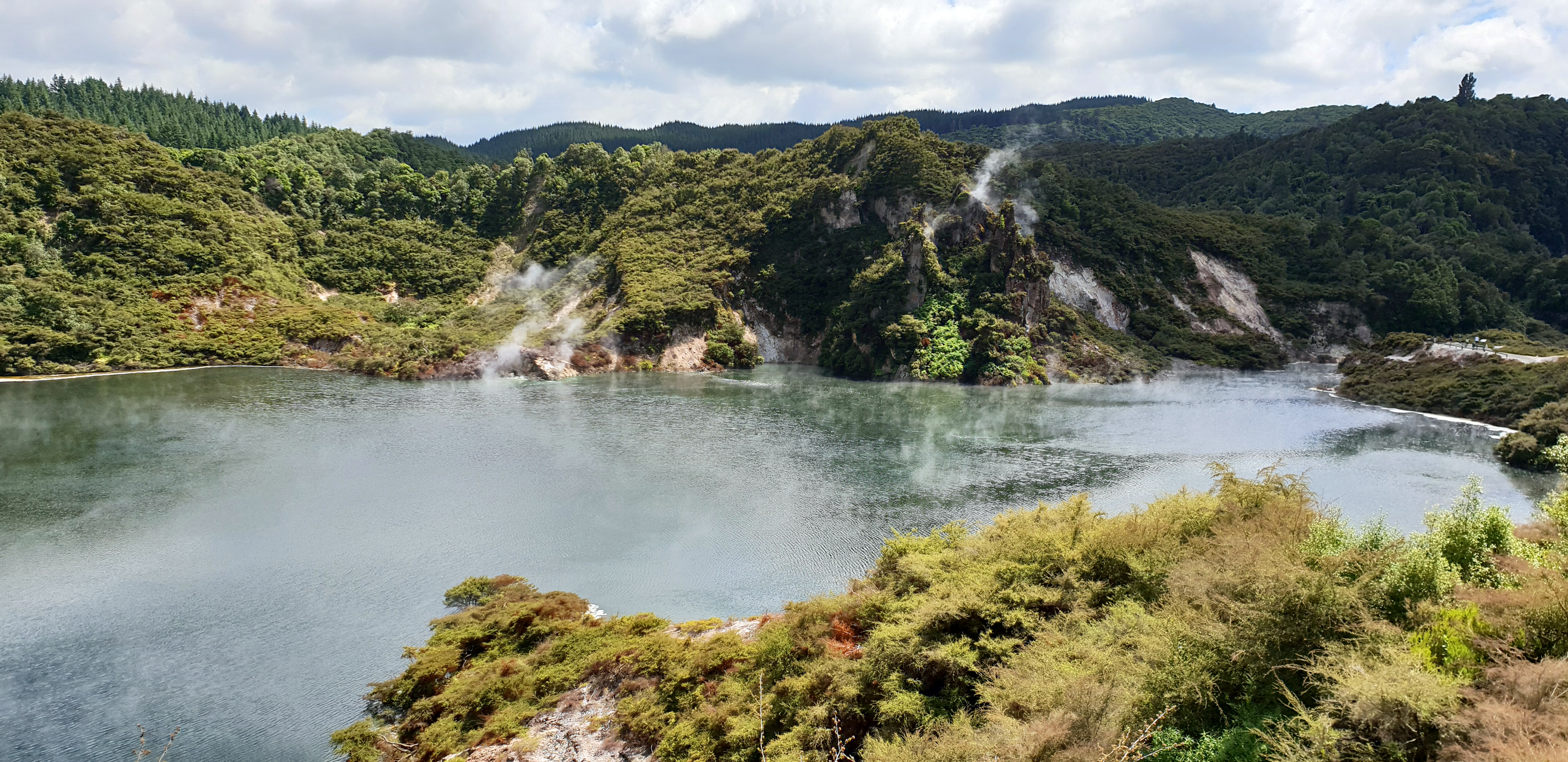
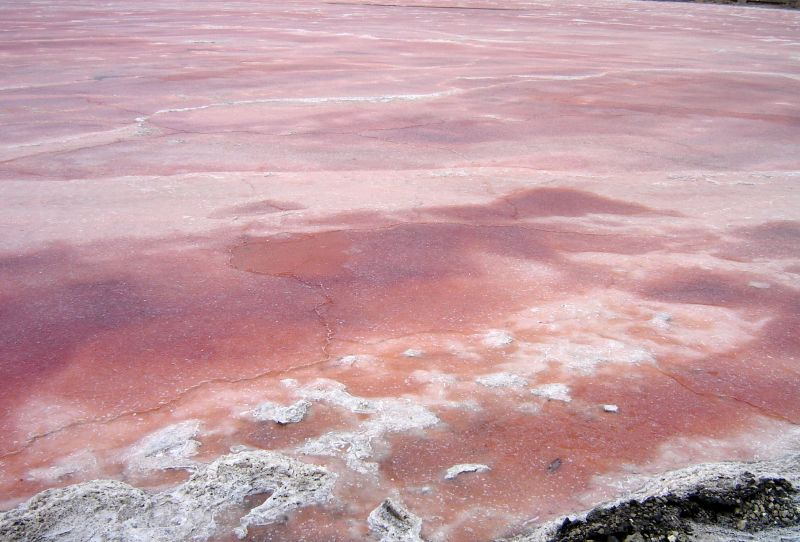
The Mawson Formation was developed in a similar way to modern Waimangu Volcanic Rift Valley of New Zealand, with Lakes Influenced by Hydrothermal vents. The Carapace Paleolake itself developed like the Lake Magadi in the Kenyan Rift Valley

The Formation includes two main locations: Carapace Nunatak in South Victoria Land, representing a deposit of interbeds dominated by sandstones of fluvial to lacustrine origin. The main outcrop of this location is notorious for the presence of a 37 m Hialoclastite, volcanic material accumulated, likely on a local lake of the same depth. This lake layers, called "Lake Carapace", host the only relatively complete fish remains recovered in the whole formation, and was likely feed by seasonal streams that brought the volcanic materials from sources located far away of the alluvial setting. The "Lake Carapace" also shows temporal exposed paleosoils, with and without roots, as well with muds cracks, indicating seasonal droughts. This lacustrine-type deposit is also found on the second main fossiliferous outcrops of the formation, being in the Queen Alexandra Range in the Central Transantarctic Mountains.

Sedimentary interbeds deposited over lava flows of the Kirkpatrick Basalt during the Early Jurassic splitting of Gondwana represent unusual freshwater paleoenvironments, with hotter conditions that allow to the diversification of the microbes (Archea).

According to Barrett, "...the basalt-dominated Mawson Formation and tholeiitic flows (Kirkpatrick Basalt)...are included in the Ferrar Group." The Mawson Formation consists of diamictites, explosion breccias, and lahar flows, evidence of magma entering water-saturated sediments. The Kirkpatrick Basalts (180 Ma) have interbedded lake sediments with plant and fish fossils.

== Fossil content ==
There abundant Fossils of microorganisms, as members of the group Archea and other who take advantage of the hydrothermal activity. The aquatic fauna, dominated by invertebrates, includes a diversity of species complete enough to establish Trophic chains: there are traces of feeding, including a coprolite of uncertain affinity with a fish scale, conchostracan valves with traces of possible biotic borings and palynological residues linked with Ostracodan valves.

=== Demospongiae ===
Color key: Taxon / Reclassified taxon / Taxon falsely reported as present / Dubious taxon or junior synonym / Ichnotaxon / Ootaxon / Morphotaxon

Notes
Uncertain or tentative taxa are in small text
~~crossed out~~ taxa are discredited.

Genus	Species	Location	Stratigraphic position	Material	Notes	Images
Demospongiae? indet.	Indeterminate	Carapace Nunatak	All the sections	Borings in invertebrate valves	Holes of random pattern in valves of Conchostracans, that resemble the boring traces of extant sponges.	

=== Arthropods ===
Fossil insect wings not described to the genus level are known from the formation. The overall record of local insects include up to 50 specimens all recovered in lacustrine deposits.

Genus	Species	Location	Material	Notes	Images
Blattaria indet.	Indeterminate	Carapace Nunatak; SW Gair Mesa	Specimens	Cockroaches.	
Carapacestheria	C. disgregaris; C. balli	Carapace Nunatak; Mackay Glacier	Shells	Diplostraca (Spinicaudatan). The most common fossil animal in the unit.	
Caraphlebia	C. antartica	Carapace Nunatak	Wings	A dragonfly of the family Selenothemidae.	
Coleoptera indet.	Indeterminate	Carapace Nunatak	Elytron	Resemblance with archostematids (Schizophoridae, Catiniidae) and some adephagian beetles (Hygrobiidae, Amphizoidae).	
Cornia	C. sp. 1; C. sp. 2	Blizzard Heights	Shells	Diplostraca (Spinicaudatan). Represents the only Jurassic Records of the genus.	
Cyclestherioides	C. alexandriae	Blizzard Heights	Shells	Diplostraca (Spinicaudatan).	
Darwinula	D. spp.	Carapace Nunatak; Mackay Glacier; Mauger Nunatak; Storm Peak	Shells	Freshwater ostracod. The specimens of this genus cannot be identified to species level.	
Ephemeroptera indet.	Indeterminate	Carapace Nunatak	Abdominal segments and paired cerci	Mayfly nymphs.	Modern mayfly
Estheriina	E. stormpeakensis	Blizzard Heights	Shells	Diplostraca (Spinicaudatan).	
Glyptoasmussia	G. prominarma; G. meridionalis; G. australospecialis	Blizzard Heights; Storm Peak	Shells	Diplostraca (Spinicaudatan).	
Hemiptera indet.	Indeterminate	Carapace Nunatak	Abdominal segments and isolated wings	True bugs.	
Isopodichnus	I. isp. type A; I. isp. type B	Carapace Nunatak	Braided Structures	Interpreted as traces of Notostracans searching for food in the lacustrine bottom.	
Lepidurus	L. stormbergensis	Carapace Nunatak	Complete Specimens	Notostracan. Represented by specimens much bigger than forms (20 mm vs 10–12 mm breadth) from South Africa.	Extant specimen
Lioestheria	L. doumanii; L. antarctis; L. longulus; L. ellioti; L. rickeri; L. beardmorensis; L. juracircularis; L. formavariabalis; L. castaneus; L. malangensis; L. minuta; L. ichthystromatos; L. crustapatulus; L. rhadinis; L. transantarctensis	Blizzard Heights; Brimstone Peak; Carapace Nunatak; Mauger Nunatak; Storm Peak	Shells	Diplostraca (Spinicaudatan). Correlated with coeval East African and Indian lioestheriids	
Oribatida indet.	Indeterminate	Storm Peak	Excavated areas filled with coprolites	Mite tunnels. The tunnels where recovered in wood stems, fern rhizomes and petioles.	example of Oribatida mite
Palaeolimnadia	P. minutula; P. sp.	Blizzard Heights; Mauger Nunatak; Storm Peak	Shells	Diplostraca (Spinicaudatan).	
Protamphisopus	P. wianamattensis	Carapace Nunatak	Complete Specimens	Freshwater Isopoda. Shows affinities with specimens from the Upper Triassic of New South Wales	Extant Phreatoicus
Pseudoasmussiata	P. defretinae	Storm Peak	Shells	Diplostraca (Spinicaudatan).	
Scoyenia	S. isp.	SW Gair Mesa	Burrows	Burrow fossils in lacustrine environment, probably made by arthropods	
Syncarida indet.	Inderminate	Carapace Nunatak	Complete Specimens	A Freshwater member of Syncarida.	Extant example

=== Fish ===
Genus	Species	Location	Material	Notes
Archaeomaenidae indet.	Indeterminate	Storm Peak	One patch of scales; Referred Coprolite	Clearly from a taxon larger than Oreochima.
Oreochima	O. ellioti	Storm Peak; Blizzard Heights; Carapace Nunatak	Multiple specimens	A Freshwater archaeomaenid. Represents a rather small genus.

=== Fungi ===
Genus	Species	Location	Stratigraphic position	Material	Notes	Images
Ceratocystis/Verticicladiella?	C/V.? sp.	Carapace Nunatak	Middle Section	Hyphae	The morphology shown by this hypae and the colonization pattern in the woods resemble that of the extant Verticicladiella wageneri.	
Fungi indet.	Indeterminate	Carapace Nunatak	Middle Section	Hyphae	Infestation traces of thick-walled hypae where recovered on Brachyphyllum-type foliage locally	
Fungi traces?	Indeterminate	Storm Peak	Middle Section	Galleries? in Valves	Galleries of an infesting organism in conchostracan valves	

=== Plants ===
Mostly of the samples recovered at Carapace Nunantak are characterised by dominance of the Cheirolepidaceous Classopollis and Corollina. Two taxa, the Araucariaceous Callialasporites dampieri and the Pteridaceae Contignisporites cooksoni are also common palynological residues in local samples. One of the best-preserved fossil flora of the Antarctic. Nearly all the floral remains where recovered from Siliclastic interbeds, being mostly of them Silidified. A large assemblage of fossil trunks, with diameters between 8 and 23 cm and possible arthropod tunnels, are known from Suture Bench. Multiple Charophyta are found across Storm Peak.

Genus	Species	Location	Material	Notes	Images
Agathoxylon	A. pseudoparenchymatosum; A. sp.	Carapace Nunantak; Mt. Fazio, Mesa Range; Haban Spur, Mesa Range	Fossil Wood	Affinities with Araucariaceae or Cheirolepidiaceae inside Pinales.	
Alisporites	A. similis; A. spp.	Carapace Nunatak; Storm Peak; Coalsack Bluff	Pollen	Affinities with the families Caytoniaceae, Corystospermaceae, Peltaspermaceae, Umkomasiaceae and Voltziaceae	
Aratrisporites	A. sp.	Carapace Nunatak	Spores	Affinities with Pleuromeiales.	
Araucariacites	A. australis	Carapace Nunatak; Storm Peak; Coalsack Bluff	Pollen	Affinities with the family Araucariaceae.	
Baculatisporites	B. comaumensis	Carapace Nunatak	Spores	Affinities with the family Osmundaceae.	
Brachyoxylon	B. sp. cf. B. currumilii; B. sp.	Carapace Nunantak; Mt. Fazio, Mesa Range	Fossil Wood	Affinities with Araucariaceae or Cheirolepidiaceae inside Pinales.	
Brachyphyllum	B. spp.	Carapace Nunatak	Several isolated Branched Shoots	A member of the family Cheirolepidiaceae. Associated with Classostrobus cones.	
Callialasporites	C. dampieri; C. segmentatus; C. turbatus	Carapace Nunatak; Storm Peak; Coalsack Bluff	Pollen	Affinities with the family Araucariaceae. Conifer pollen from medium to large arboreal plants.	
Chimaerostrobus	C. minutus	Carapace Nunatak	Single Pollen Cone	Chimaerostrobus is reminiscent of extant Araucariaceae and several extinct taxa such as Kobalostrobus and Voltziales.	
Cibotiumspora	C. jurienensis	Carapace Nunatak	Spores	Affinities with Cyatheaceae and Dicksoniaceae inside Filicopsida.	
Cladophlebis	C. oblonga	Carapace Nunantak	Isolated Pinnae	A Fern of the family Osmundaceae.	
Classopollis	C. classoides	Carapace Nunatak; Storm Peak; Coalsack Bluff	Pollen	Affinities with Cheirolepidiaceae inside Pinales.	
Classostrobus	C. elliotii	Carapace Nunatak	Five permineralized pollen cones	A member of the Cheirolepidiaceae. More than five Brachyphyllum-type leaves where found in close association with these cones.	
Coniopteris	C. hymenophylloides	Carapace Nunantak	Isolated Pinnae	A Fern of the family Polypodiales inside Polypodiidae.	
Contignisporites	C. cooksoni	Carapace Nunatak; Storm Peak; Coalsack Bluff	Spores	Affinities with the Pteridaceae in the Polypodiopsida. Forest ferns from humid ground locations.	
Corollina	C. spp.	Carapace Nunatak; Storm Peak; Coalsack Bluff	Pollen	Affinities with Cheirolepidiaceae inside Pinales.	
Cupressacites	C. ramachandrae	Carapace Nunatak; Storm Peak; Coalsack Bluff	Pollen	Affinities with Cupressaceae.	
Cyathidites	C. australis; C. minor	Carapace Nunatak	Spores	Affinities with the family Cyatheaceae or Adiantaceae. Arboreal fern spores.	
Dictyophyllitides	D. harrisi	Carapace Nunatak	Spores	Affinities with the family Schizaeaceae, Dicksoniaceae or Matoniaceae.	
Dictyozamites	D. sp. cf. minisculus	Carapace Nunatak	Leaflets	A member of Bennettitales.	
Elatocladus	E. confertus	Carapace Nunatak	Branched Shoots	A member of the family Cupressaceae. Probably represent belong to the Conifer Austrohamia.	
Exesipollenites	E. spp.	Carapace Nunatak; Storm Peak; Coalsack Bluff	Pollen	Affinities with Araucariaceae or Cheirolepidiaceae inside Pinales.	
Ginkgocycadophytus	G. nitidus	Carapace Nunatak	Pollen	Affinities with the family Karkeniaceae and Ginkgoaceae.	
Inaperturopollenites	I. limbatus	Carapace Nunatak	Pollen	Affinities with Cupressaceae.	
Ischyosporites	I. crateris	Carapace Nunatak; Storm Peak; Coalsack Bluff	Spores	Incertade sedis pteridophyte.	
Marchantites	M. mawsonii	Carapace Nunantak	Isolated Thalli	A liverwort of the family Marchantiales.	
Mixoxylon	M. jeffersonii	Mt. Fazio, Mesa Range	Fossil Wood	Spermatophyte Wood, probably related to Bennettitales or Cycadales and previously known only from Cretaceous strata.	
Neoraistrickia	N. spp.	Carapace Nunatak	Spores	Affinities with the Selaginellaceae. Herbaceous lycophyte flora, similar to ferns, found in humid settings.	
Nothodacrium	N. warreni	Carapace Nunatak; Storm Peak	Cutinised and fertile material	A genus with Resemblance with the extant Dacrydium, yet a more recent work found it to be just a convergently evolved relative of Telemachus.	
Osmundacidites	O. senectus; O. wellmanii	Carapace Nunatak; Storm Peak; Coalsack Bluff	Spores	Affinities with the family Osmundaceae. Near fluvial current ferns, related to the modern Osmunda regalis.	
Otozamites	O. antarcticus	Carapace Nunatak	Leaflets	A member of Bennettitales.	
Pagiophyllum	P. spp.	Carapace Nunantak	Single Branched Shoot	A member of the family Araucariaceae.	
Pinuspollenites	P. globosaccus	Carapace Nunatak; Storm Peak; Coalsack Bluff	Pollen	Affinities with the family Pinaceae.	
Podosporites	P. variabilis	Carapace Nunatak	Pollen	Affinities with the family Podocarpaceae.	
Podostrobus	P. warrenii	Carapace Nunatak	Single cone	A member of the family Voltziales. Likely represents the cone of the same conifer that produced the Nothodacrium foliage.	
Protocupressinoxylon	P. spp.	Coombs Hills; Storm Peak; Mt. Fazio, Mesa Range	Fossil Wood	A member of the family Cupressaceae.	
Protohaploxypinus	P. sp.	Carapace Nunatak; Storm Peak; Coalsack Bluff	Pollen	Affinities with the family Pinaceae. Conifer pollen from medium to large arboreal plants.	
Polyphacelus	P. stormensis	Storm Peak	Silicified rachides	A Polypodiopsidan of the family Dipteridaceae. Closely related to Clathropteris meniscoides.	
Puntactosporites	P. scabratus	Carapace Nunatak	Spores	Incertade sedis pteridophyte.	
Retitriletes	R. austroclavatidites	Carapace Nunatak	Spores	Affinities with the Lycopodiaceae.	
Sculptisporis	S. moretonensis	Carapace Nunatak	Spores	Affinities with the family Sphagnaceae. "Peat moss" spores.	
Striatella	S. seebergensis	Carapace Nunatak	Spores	Affinities with the Pteridaceae. Forest ferns from humid ground locations.	
Todisporites	T. minor	Carapace Nunatak	Spores	Affinities with the Pteridaceae. Forest ferns from humid ground locations.	
Trilobosporites	T. antiquus	Carapace Nunatak; Storm Peak; Coalsack Bluff	Spores	Affinities with Dicksoniaceae. Tree fern spores.	
Verrucosisporites	V. varians	Carapace Nunatak	Spores	Incertade sedis pteridophyte.	
Vitreisporites	V. signatus	Carapace Nunatak	Pollen	Affinities with the Caytoniaceae	
Zamites	Z. spp.	Carapace Nunatak	Leaflets	Spermatophyta incertae sedis	

== See also ==
- List of fossiliferous stratigraphic units in Antarctica
- Shafer Peak Formation
- Ellsworth Land Volcanic Group
- Hanson Formation
- Shackleton Formation
- South Polar region of the Cretaceous
- Toarcian turnover
- Toarcian formations
  - Marne di Monte Serrone, Italy
  - Calcare di Sogno, Italy
  - Sachrang Formation, Austria
  - Posidonia Shale, Lagerstätte in Germany
  - Ciechocinek Formation, Germany and Poland
  - Krempachy Marl Formation, Poland and Slovakia
  - Lava Formation, Lithuania
  - Azilal Group, North Africa
  - Whitby Mudstone, England
  - Fernie Formation, Alberta and British Columbia
    - Poker Chip Shale
  - Whiteaves Formation, British Columbia
  - Navajo Sandstone, Utah
  - Los Molles Formation, Argentina
  - Kandreho Formation, Madagascar
  - Kota Formation, India
  - Cattamarra Coal Measures, Australia
