= Cañadón Asfalto Formation =

Geological formation in southern Argentina

- Stratigraphic range: Middle-Late Toarcian; ~179.17–178.07 Ma Dubious assigantion of the Puesto Almada Member of likely Callovian-Oxfordian age, that can be part of the Cañadón Calcáreo Formation or the Sierra de la Manea Formation instead
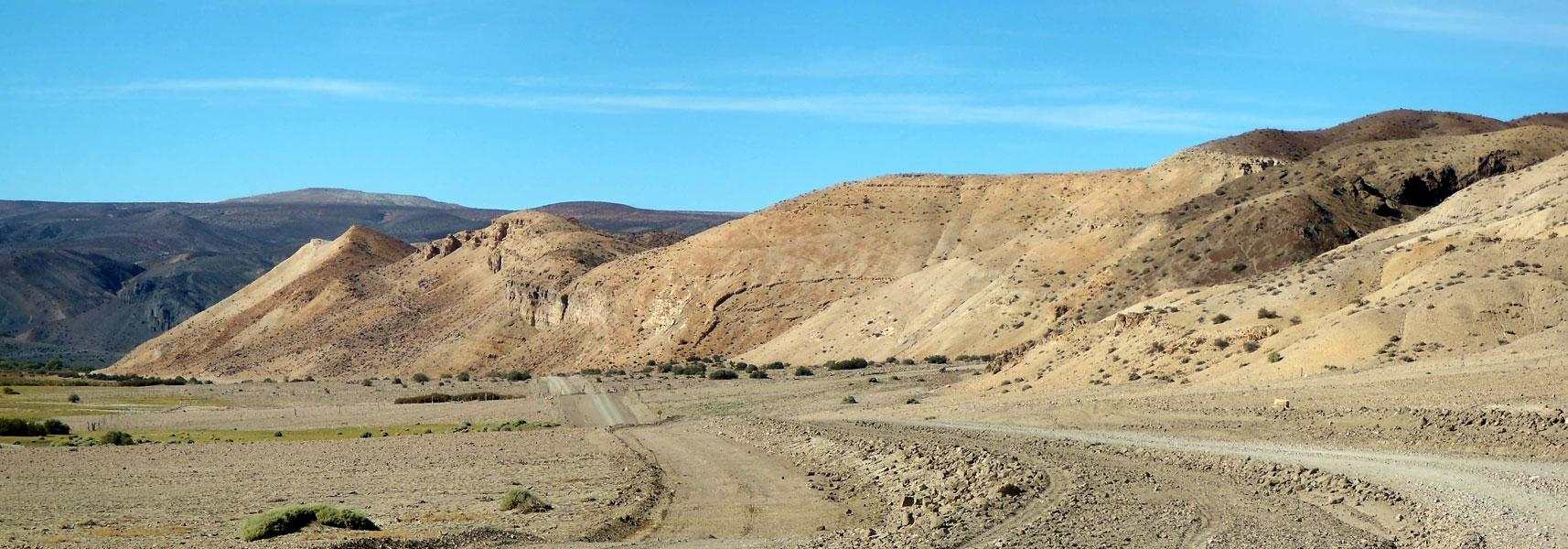
- Cañadón Asfalto Formation near Cerro Cóndor, Chubut, Argentina
- Type: Geological formation
- Unit of: Sierra de Olte Group
- Sub-units: Las Chacritas Member; Puesto Almada Member?
- Underlies: Sierra de la Manea Formation?; Cañadón Calcáreo Formation
- Overlies: Lonco Trapial Formation
- Thickness: 600 m (2,000 ft)

Lithology
- Primary: Sandstone
- Other: Limestone, shale, conglomerate, tuffite

Location
- Coordinates: 43.4°S 69.2°W
- Approximate paleocoordinates: 40.5°S 29.3°W
- Region: Chubut Province, Patagonia
- Country: Argentina
- Extent: Cañadón Asfalto Basin

Type section
- Named for: The Cañadón Asfalto in Chubut River region
- Named by: Stipanicic, P.N., Rodrigo, F.O.L., & Martínez, C.G
- Year defined: 1968
- Cañadón Asfalto Formation (Argentina)

The Cañadón Asfalto Formation is a geological formation from the Lower Jurassic, with doubtful layers of Late Jurassic age previously referred to it. The Cañadón Asfalto Formation is located in the Cañadón Asfalto Basin, a rift basin in the Chubut Province of northwestern Patagonia, southern Argentina. The basin started forming in the earliest Jurassic.

The formation is composed of fluvial-lacustrine deposits, typically sandstones and shales with a saline paleolake carbonate evaporitic sequence of limestone in its lowest Las Chacritas Member. Interbedded with these are volcanic tuffites. It is divided into two members, the Las Chacritas Member, and the overlying Puesto Almada member, but the latter has also been assigned to the overlying Cañadón Calcáreo Formation by other authors.

The exact age of the formation has been controversial, with uranium-lead dating of the volcanic tuff beds having given various different ages. Recent work has suggested that the base of the formation was formed around 171 Ma, during the upper Aalenian, with the main age for the Lower Las Chacritas Member being around 168 Ma, during the Bajocian, Bathonian and Callovian, while the overlying Puesto Almada Member seems to be around 158 Ma, or Oxfordian in age. But that changed thanks to the discovery of zircons near the location of the discovery of Bagualia, allowing a precise dating of the Las Charcitas Member as Middle-Late Toarcian, 178-179 million years. And a more advanced dating constrained the age of the formation as Middle-Late Toarcian, contemporaneous to the Chon Aike volcanic activity, making it a local equivalent to Antarctica's Mawson Formation (Ferrar Volcanic Province) and the South African Drakensberg Group (Karoo Volcanic Province).

This unit belongs to the Patagonia-Antarctic Peninsula sequence, along with the Marifil, Lonco Trapial & Garamilla Formation in Central-Northern Patagonia. They form part of the wider first-stage event (V1) of the Chon Aike Province, proving connection with both areas in the Early Jurassic, with the closest unit in South America being the Bahía Laura Volcanic Complex (Deseado Massif), the Quemado Complex (Austral Patagonia) & the Tobífera and Lemaire Formations (Fuegian Andes). Other Units include Bajo Pobre, Cañadón Huemules and Roca Blanca Formations in Argentina. Finally in Antarctica the Mapple, Brennecke Formations & Ellsworth Land Volcanic Group and Ellsworth-Whitmore terrane isolated granitoids.

The Volcanic-Lacustrine interbeds found in units like the Ellsworth Land Volcanic Group of the Antarctic Peninsula are not only coeval with, but also continuations of the biozone seen in the Chacritas member.

== History ==
The study of the Jurassic deposits of the Cañadón Asfalto Basin started with Alejandro Matveievich Piatnitzky in 1936, who studied the zone from the Genoa River to the Chubut River, dividing it into several stratigraphic units. In doing this he described the first layers that can be included within the Cañadón Asfalto Formation, the so-called "Capas de Estheria", recovered in places like the Cañón de Bagual. This layer is associated with plant remains such as Arthrotaxites, which allowed them to be assigned to the Jurassic interval. His works were followed by several authors, including M.A. Flores, who studied the layers in between Chubut River, Sierra Cuadrada and Valle del Sapo in 1948–1957.

Flores defined these layers, the Estheria unit, as bituminous Shales. He found remains of sauropod dinosaurs and floral remains, which led to the suggestion of a referral of this section to the upper middle Jurassic, constraining its known age. In 1949, the unit was referred to the Sierra de Olte Group by J. Frenguelli, who also described some floral remains. It was the team led by Stipanicic that named the Cañadón Asfalto Formation, referred to back then as a Callovian-Oxfordian unit. Following this definition, Tasch & Volkheimer published the main initial faunal review of the strata in 1970, with a clear focus on the spinicaudatan fauna, though it also included the first regional correlations. This work was followed by that of others, such as C. Nakayama in 1972, F. Nullo & C. Proserpio in 1975 and J.M.C. Turner in 1983, all focused on the geological aspects of the unit.

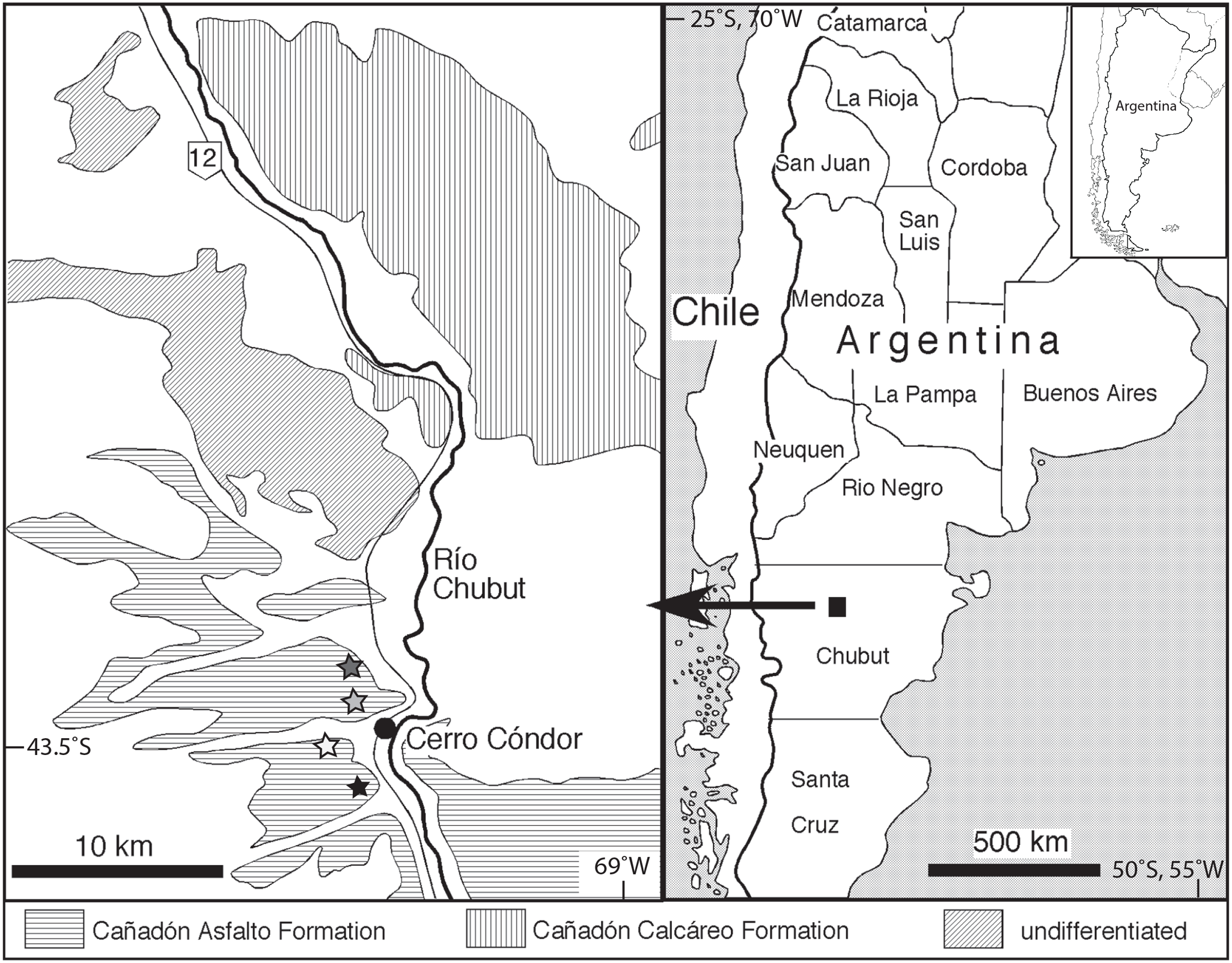
Formation map and location, shaded horizontally

In 1979, Bonaparte published the first description of dinosaurian remains from the location, including the sauropods Patagosaurus and Volkheimeria and the theropod Piatnitzkysaurus. Towards the 90s, the Cañadón Asfalto Formation was subdivided into lower and upper sections, with the lower being equivalent to the Puesto Gilbert Formation and the upper coeval with the Cañadón Calcáreo Formation. E.G. Figari established the two actual members in 2005, following his 1990's works, and formally called them the lower and upper member. In 2012, these two were respectively named the Las Chacritas Member and the Puesto Almada Member. Recent works such as Cúneo et al. in 2013 have proven that the formation is older than previously thought, and that some of the sections that form the Puesto Almada member belong to the Cañadón Calcáreo Fm. Beyond the U-Pb and Lu-Hf zircon datings, the main focus of ongoing work has been on the discovery of new fossil sites like the "Canela" and "A12" sites, and revision of both floral and faunal discoveries of previously discovered ones, especially on the "Queso rallado" site.

== Geology ==
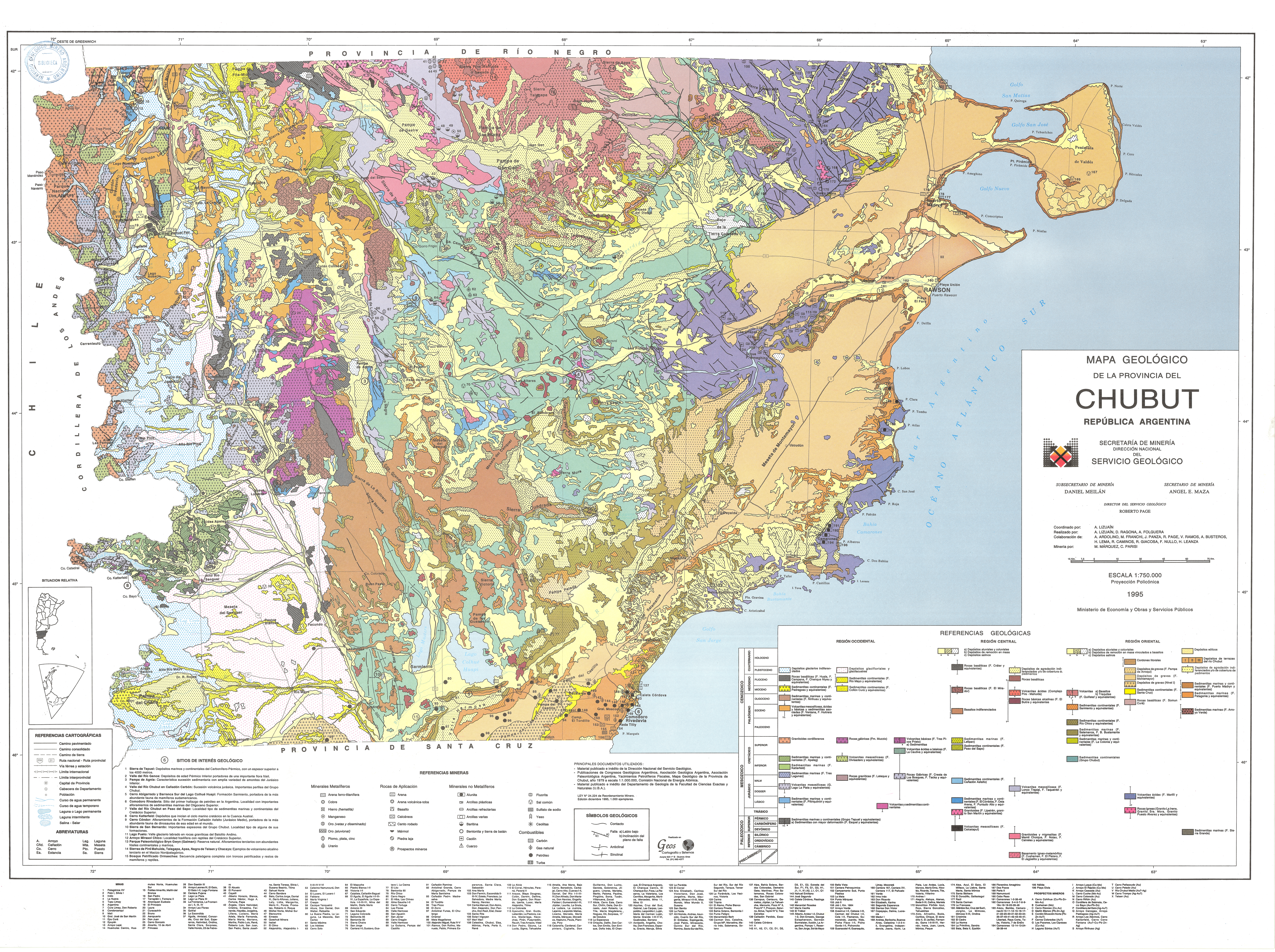
Geologic map of the Chubut Province, including the Cañadon Asfalto Fm

The Cañadón Asfalto Basin (whose full name is Somuncurá-Cañadón Asfalto rift basin) represents among the most extensive exposure of Jurassic rocks in South America. It limits to the northwest with the Subcordilleran Patagonian Batholith+Ñirihuau Basin and to the south with the Alto de Cotricó, a structural element that separates it from the San Jorge Gulf Basin. It was developed over a Paleozoic basement, whose composition is dominated by plutonic and metamorphic rocks, that, along the Tria-Jurassic layers are part of a local succession of three megasequences, being the Jurassic ones linked with a mixed mosaic of volcanic (was likely linked to the Chon Aike Silicic Large Igneous Province) and sedimentary rocks (fluvial and lacustrine). The Jurassic section can be correlated with an extensive tectonic regime for the central units in the basin, with also the presence of "pull-apart" models. This "pull-apart" model evolved based on the combined presence of diverse structural and depositional features that include lake-derived layer associated with vaporite horizons and various types of synsedimentary deformation, all with the presence of intercalations of basaltic strata. In this basin, towards the southern sector three microbasins are defined: Cerro Cóndor, Cañadón Calcáreo and Fossati. The rotation of the Chubut Jurassic blocks is documented, yet the lateral components seem to have been linked to oblique extension. The Chubut Province was in the Jurassic part of a local Rift that was a result of the fragmentation of Gondwana, associated in extension with the opening of the Weddell Sea and to the migration towards the south of the Antarctic Peninsula, developed in a similar way to the rift seen in the coeval deposits of the Transantarctic Mountains (Specially the Mawson Formation in the Queen Alexandra Rangue). This basin was later affected by a regional contractional phase during the Early Cretaceous (seen in the deposition of the Chubut Group).

Local vulcanism was linked with the Chon Aike Igneous Province, or Chon Aike-Antarctic Province. The Vulcanism was product of initial rifting, what also led to the Karoo-Ferrar (South Africa And Antarctica), where the Early Jurassic facies in Patagonia and Larsen Basin deposited influenced by the pushing the Wedell Sea basin did over the surrounding plates, as can be seen in the similarities between the Sweeney Formation and the Lonco Tapial Formation. In the Cañadón Asfalto Fm is found on thin layers of tuffs produced by distal ash falls within the lacustrine layers of the lower Chacritas Member, with the presence of sectors with scarce pyroclastic flows and basaltic flows. The interdigitation between carbonate and volcaniclastic deposits is clearly evident in the surroundings of Estancia Fossatti and in the Navidad Sector. Other Volcanic sectors nearby that may have influenced this formation include the Subcordilleran & Cordilleran Patagonian Batholiths in the west.

=== Age ===
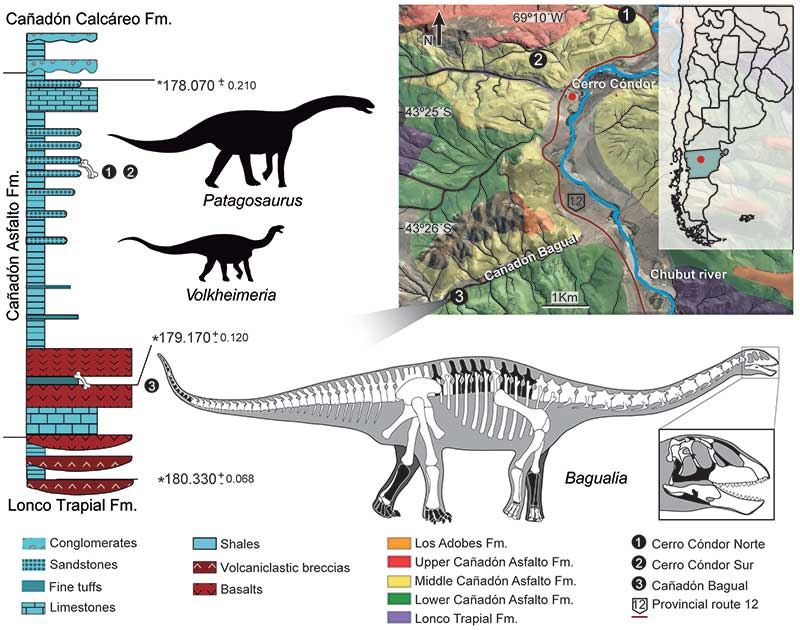
Location map and stratigraphic distribution of the main sauropods of the Cañadón Asfalto Formation

The Age of the sediments of the Cañadón Asfalto Formation has been debated for decades. It was initially Piatnitzky in 1939 who noted the over lain position of this sediments over the basement, and suggested possible Jurassic to Earliest Cretaceous age based on regional correlations. In the description of the Cañadón Asfalto Formation in 1968, Stipanicic et al. defined that both Cañadón Asfalto and Los Adobes where of "Dogger" (=middle Jurassic) age. In 1984, there was a work that correlated the unit with the Ferrarotti successions, finding differences with the Cañadón Asfalto and upper layers lumped initially on it, suggesting there can be an Upper Jurassic or Lower Cretaceous distinctive unit. Based on the Microfossils and flora, Toarcian to Callovian was assigned to Las Chacritas member, while Callovian-Tithonian was assigned to the Puesto Almada member. However, this wasn't followed by the appearance of numerous radiometric datings obtained from outcrops from different depocenters: starting in 2007, where a K/Ar age of 170 ±4.4 Ma was obtain for the Las Chacritas Member, followed in 2010 of a younger 147.1 ± 3.3 Ma for the Puesto Almada Member, that was later reassigned to 161 ± 3 Ma by U/Pb dating on zircons in the locality Estancia La Sin Rumbo. Then, in 2013 Cúneo et al. provided the considered most controversial datations to date: Toarcian, 176,15 ± 0,12 and 178,766 ± 0,092 Ma at Cerro Bayo and Cerro Cóndor respectively, yet this was initially contested (with 168.2 ± 2.2 Ma for Chacritas member) and Puesto Almada constrained latter in 2017 to 160.3 ± 1.7-158.3 ± 1.3 Ma (Callovian-Oxfordian). In 2016 a depth evaluation of local basement samples on Sanidine yielded the current oldest age, 182,8 ± 0,8 Ma, Early Toarcian. Yet, it was a more recent dating, the one that fully constrained the fossiliferous sections of Las Chacritas Member to Middle Toarcian age (179,4 ± 0,059 Ma, 179,4 ± 0,13 Ma & 177,2 ± 0,4 Ma), that was supported with the discovery of zircons of the same range in the Bagualia layers (Cañadón Bagual) and in other outcrops, including detailed age constraint in the uppermost level of the member proving a definitive age constraint of all the biota recovered in this layers to 179.17 ± 0.12 Ma-178.07 ± 0.21 Ma. Additional, also Toarcian (179.481 ± 0.059, 179.41 ± 0.13, and 177.27 ± 0.40 Ma) ages, were measured the same year in nearby outcrops, Barreño, Alice Creek and Quebrada Subsidiaria, near the Cerro Cóndor depocenter. The Puesto Almada member is in a more complex situation, as seems some or all of its layers can belong on reality to the Cañadón Calcáreo Formation. A separate unit has been even suggested, the Sierra de la Manea Formation, and this last one can include a great part of the Puesto Almada layers.

== Paleoenvironment ==
The Cañadón Asfalto formation represents a continuous inland sector on lacustrine and terrestrial habitats far from the nearest coast. The closest marine settings where recovered at the west in the Chubut Basin, where, for example the Toarcian Mulanguiñeu Formation recovers a diverse record of marine fauna, including index ammonites (Dactylioceras and Canavaria), brachiopods (groups Spiriferinida and Terebratulida), bivalves (families Nuculidae, Nuculanidae, Polidevciidae and Malletiidae), gastropods (families Eucyclidae, Trochoidea, Pseudomelanoidea, Cirridae, Procerithiidae, etc. ), calcareous tube annelids (Serpulidae), gregarious corals (Montlivaltia), decapods (Mecochirus robbianoi), crinoids (Pentacrinites), spines of Echinoidea, leaf remains (Elatocladus hallei; Conifers) and traces of bioturbation (ichnogenera Rhizocorallium and Lapispira), indicating that at this time the Paleopacific Ocean flooded the basin hosting benthic macroinvertebrate associations in a carbonate-elastic ramp, however, none of the measured transgressions flooded the Cañadón Asfalto Basin (although it is estimated that in the upper Toarcian the coast was very close to Paso de Indios), although it was influenced by the volcanic events of the latter, as shown by the traces of volcanic tuffs in the Toarcian part of the Paso de Indios formation. Beyond this sector, the Ordovic-Devonian North Patagonian Massif and the Deseado Massif gave a montane influence to the deposition of the formation. This can be seen in the so-called "Navidad district section" recovers similar Pb isotopic compositions to the ores found on this massifs.

Back in the Early Jurassic the Patagonian region was marked by distinct geological features, including the Subcordilleran Plutonic Belt and the North Patagonian Batholith, coeval with volcanic activity occurring inland like Chon Aike in the east. Between the Subcordilleran Batholith and Chon Aike lied an elongated shape rifted basin with various small basins and grabens caused by regional faults that underwent different phases of rifting during the Upper Sinemurian-Lower Pliensbachian, resulting in diverse volcanic phenomena like caldera formation and explosive eruptions due to magma intrusion. Latter in the lower-middle Pliensbachian a subsequent transpressional phase led to structural changes, influencing the stretching of the continental crust and affecting sedimentation patterns in the adjacent environments of the marine Osta Arena and Cañadón Asfalto formations. Contrarily to the underliying Lonco Trapial volcanic units, the ones from the Cañadón Asfalto preserve the remanence acquired during their formation, part of the Lower Pliensbachian-Toarcian local NNW-oriented transpressive phase. The Cañadón Asfalto Formation along with the Lonco Trapial Formation, Bajo Pobre and Cañadón Huemules, Marifil, Garamilla, Bahía Laura Volcanic Complex, Quemado Complex, Tobífera and Lemaire Formations in Argentina, Mapple, Brennecke Formations & Ellsworth Land Volcanic Group & indet granitoids in Antarctic Peninsula, are part of the main mafic sectors of the Chon Aike-Antarctic Peninsula, being one of the largest rhyolitic provinces in the world, what is seen on the abundance of volcanic intrusions in the otherwise lacustine/terrestrial facies of the formation, what can be seen in the hyaloclastite and peperite facies of the Navidad sector, indicators of interaction of lacustrine waters and magmatic sources, that seem to come mostly from local basement rifts. Recent U-Pb geochronology data from the Antarctic Peninsula area found that the "Chon Aike V1-V2" crops out extensively in northeast Patagonia and the southern Antarctic Peninsula, being both regions narrow belts sub parallel to the proto-Pacific margin of Gondwana. A land bridge between SA and continental Antarctica is expected to be present at the time, as the Larsen Basin records a coeval fully terrestrial block Syn-rift megasequence, correlated and connected with the Magallanes Basin.

The type locality of the Formation at Cañadón Asfalto creek records strata accumulated in rift-related, lacustrine-fluvial-alluvial environments intermittently subjected to volcanic input, resembling the same conditions in the modern African Great Rift Valley. Floral composition was made of Lycophytes, Equisetales, Ferns, Conifers, Bennettitales and Peltaspermales, all along abundance of charcoal particles, suggest frequent Wildfires and/or Forest fires. Deep lacutrine bodies show abundance of Charales.

=== Chacritas Member ===
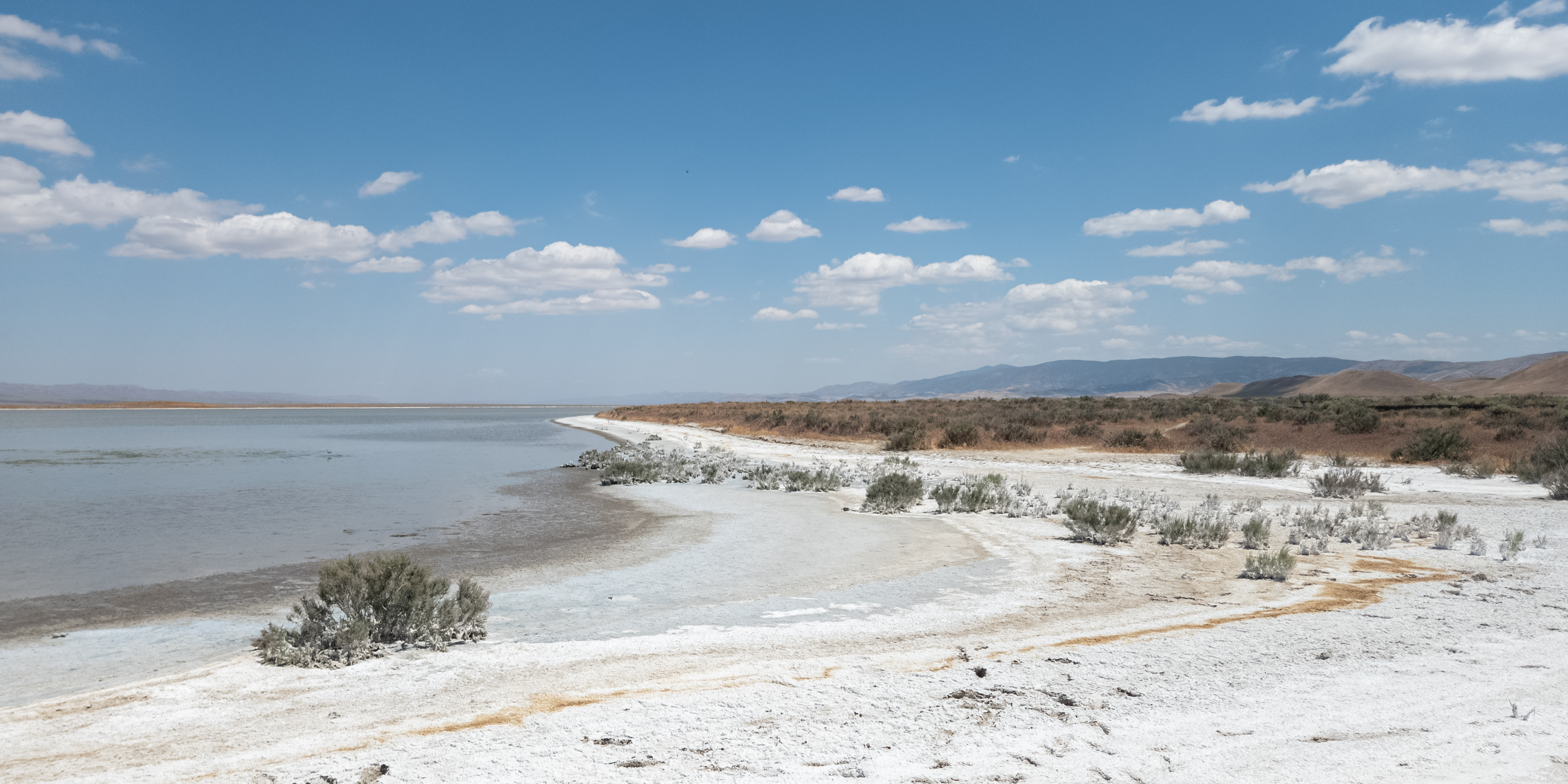
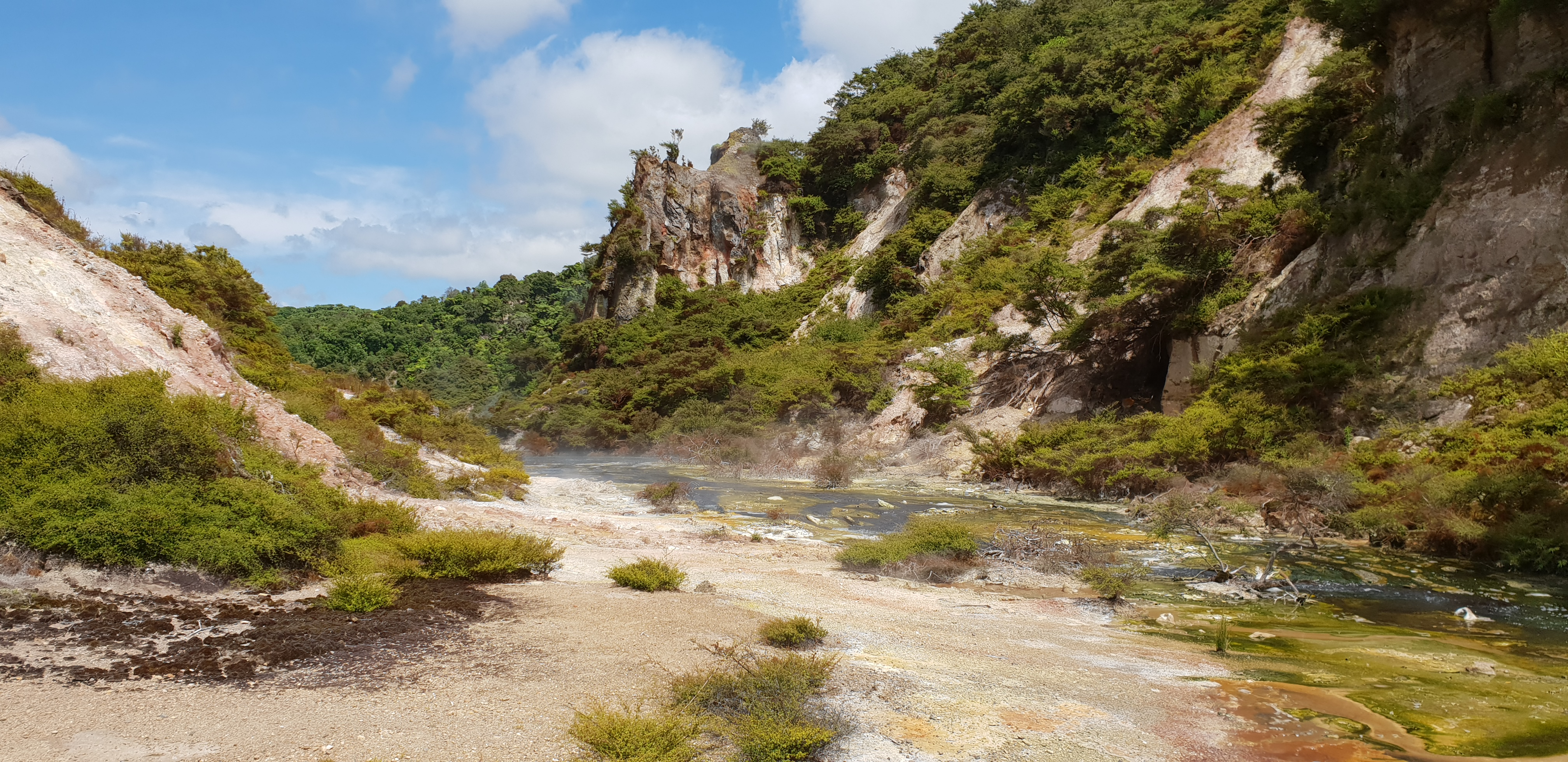
The Chacritas Member hosted volcanic-influenced soda lake (Example from modern California), while nearby environments hosted varied floral belts from coastal Cheirolepidaceous forests to highland Podocarps (Modern Equivalent from New Zealand), a rift area with nearby volcanic influence of the Chon Aike Province

This member is mostly made of two major depositional settings: lacustrine and fluvial deposits, that have intervals of tuffaceous materials, suggesting this environments coevolved with volcanic activity. Palustrine littoral environments levels are seen at Cerro Cóndor and Estancia Fossati, characterized by the presence of lacustrine limestones interbedded with shales, tuffs and sandstones. The lacustrine section has been called the "Chacritas Paleolake", and seems to have been a rather saline or even hypersaline hydrologically closed pan lake, shallow in deep, with marginal zones and palustrine subenvironments made of low-energy ramp-like margins. This can be seen on several sections such as the Cañadón Carrizal, where layers that how aerial exposures, and so a regression tendency in a low-energy lake, what changued the biota locally (ex. microbial activity on surfaces). The lacustrine facies can be seen in other locations, as in Quebrada de las Chacritas, where at least 5 types of different facies, with both lacustrine and Stromatolite bioherm origin were described, showing this last ones a microbial belt. The increased amount of algal matter and microbial bioherms suggest highstand levels of the lake, while on layers where mudcracks and pedogenesis occurs shows likely a lowstand of the water level that killed the microbial matter. It has been determined that the main lacustrine body existed in the so-called "Cerro Cóndor Biohermal Belt", while Cañadón Las Chacritas facies show progradations towards the south until it face basaltic materials in southern area of Cerro Cóndor, reflected in the flooding of the belt and increased algal fossils. This lake was clearly influenced by the volcanic activity, as well was likely a product of the rifting that the Cañadón Asfalto basin suffered back in the Toarcian. This can be seen on the abundance of chert like the one recovered in modern Lake Magadi in Kenyan section of the African Rift. This chert is indicator of high alkaline settings in shallow lacustrine units, thus temporal increasing of Magadi-like mineralization in the lake may have been possible. An identical type of lake, known as "Carapace Lake", also developed in a rift system was located in the coeval Mawson Formation of Antarctica, what suggest that both, Carapace and Chacritas were likely alkaline lakes that had notorious influence of hydrothermal fluids. This type of lacustrine facies is seen also in the Antarctic Peninsula Sweeney Formation and in the Larsen Basin, that represent a continuation of the same Biozone both Lonco Tapial and Cañadón Asfalto are included.

The abundance of organic matter in the lacustrine facies, great presence of microinvertebrate fauna together with the rare presence of mudcracks, low breccia presence and pedogeniclayers suggest that the immediate setting along the lake had between arid and sub-humid conditions. Nearby emerged settings have abundant Classopollis spp., key genera for thermophilic settings, what can suggest the nearby emerged lands had warm and dry conditions. Other species suggest a warm to warm-temperate climate, with markedly seasonal (monsoonal) characteristics that coincide with the presence of the Seasonally Dry Subtropical Biome/Seasonal tropical forest. Overall this flora, as recovered in the Cañadón Lahuincó and Cañadón Caracoles sections suggest the presence of fluvial (riparian) and coastal lacustrine floras, along with inland dry settings dominated by Conifers, overall in a similar distribution that the one seen in coaeval layers in Australia, as well the Mawson Formation in Antarctica. Data from local cuticles of Araucariaceous and Cheirolepidicaceous conifers have been put under microscope, what can lead to future deeper interpretations of local climate fluctuation. Initial revisions of Brachyphyllum spp. cuticles has led to know the presence of common environmental stress on local conifers during the deposition of the Chacritas member.

=== Puesto Almada Member ===
This member was originally described as being mostly a fluvial transition where the local lacustrine settings disappeared, yet, locations such as Cerro Bandera show that it hosted lacustrine, palustrine, and pedogenic deposits. Alluvial facies are the main indicators of the sediment supply, while the lacustrine facies suggest a second water filling locally, where a smaller body of water known as "Almada Paleolake" was developed, creating also several coeval wetlands that are more notorious towards the uppermost section. Tuff intrusions are more scarce than in the underlaying section and seem to be derived from ash directly falling into water. Despite its name, the "Almada Fish Fauna", including genera such as Condorlepis groeberi, has been proven to belong to the Cañadón Calcáreo Formation, as well the crocodilian genus Almadasuchus, all of this is due to the uncertain difference and limit between both units. Overall climate conditions where similar to the underliying section, yet with a more marked seasonality and a more humid touch.

== Paleobiota ==
The rocks of the formation preserve a diverse biota, including plants, dinosaurs, invertebrates, mammals and pterosaurs, among others. Notable named dinosaurs include theropods (Asfaltovenator, Condorraptor, Eoabelisaurus, and Piatnitzkysaurus), sauropods (Bagualia, Patagosaurus, and Volkheimeria), and ornithischians (Manidens).

== See also ==
- List of dinosaur-bearing rock formations
- Azilal Formation
- Evergreen Formation
- Mawson Formation
- Drakensberg Group
- Deseado Massif
- Chon Aike Formation
- La Matilde Formation
- Paleobiota of the Cañadón Asfalto Formation
