= Ellsworth Land Volcanic Group =

Geological formation in the Latady Basin, Ellsworth Land, Antarctic Peninsula

- Stratigraphic range: Toarcian; ~183.4–177.5 Ma
- Type: Geological formation
- Sub-units: Mount Poster Formation; Sweeney Formation
- Underlies: Anderson Formation (In part)
- Thickness: 600–2000 m

Lithology
- Primary: Silicic ignimbrites
- Other: Mudstone, Sandstone

Location
- Coordinates: 74°S 65°E
- Region: Antarctic Peninsula
- Country: Antarctica
- Extent: Ellsworth Land

Type section
- Named for: Ellsworth Land
- Named by: Hunter & Cantrill
- Ellsworth Land Volcanic Group (Antarctica)

The Ellsworth Land Volcanic Group is a geological formation in the Latady Basin, Ellsworth Land, Antarctic Peninsula, with a calculated maximum depositional age of 183.4 ± 1.4 Ma, and a younger age around 177.5 ± 2.2 Ma, covering the Toarcian stage of the Jurassic Period in the Mesozoic Era. This group is made up of volcanoclastic material, with the Mount Poster Formation, composed of silicic ignimbrites, and the Sweeney Formation, consisting of a mix of basaltic and sedimentary facies.

The Mount Poster Formation was the first described in 1985, found on the locality of the same name, with exposures across northwestern areas of the southern Black Coast, Orville Coast, and eastern Ellsworth Land. It was found to be made of pyroclastic rocks along lava flows, all from intracaldera origin, interbedded with few sedimentary rocks. Originally, dating analyses indicated ages 189 ± 3 Ma-188 ± 3 Ma for the lowermost sections (Lower Pliensbachian), and 167 ± 3 Ma (Bathonian) for different locations within the formation, yet was later constrained to the Toarcian-only, between 183 and 177 Ma. Due to this datations it was allocated in the lowermost section of the Jurassic Latady Basin layers, overlaid by what was defined back then as "Latady Formation" (now Latady Group), now proven to be the Sweeney Formation. The Sweeney Fm rocks outcrop on W Potter Peak, Mount Jenkins, Mount Edward, Mount Ballard and Mount Wasilewski. Local vulcanism is known to have continued in the Middle-Late Jurassic, as evidenced in the Latady Group deposition.

The Ellsworth Land Volcanic Group belongs to the Patagonia-Antarctic Peninsula sequence, along the Mapple & Brennecke Formations and the N and Ellsworth-Whitmore terrane isolated granitoids. This units form part of the wider first-stage event (V1) of the Chon Aike Province, proving connection with both areas in the Early Jurassic, with the closest unit in South America being the Tobífera and Lemaire Formations (Fuegian Andes), the Quemado Complex (Austral Patagonia), the Bahía Laura Volcanic Complex (Deseado Massif) and the Marifil, Cañadón Asfalto, Lonco Trapial & Garamilla Formation in Central-Northern Patagonia. Other Units include Bajo Pobre, Cañadón Huemules and Roca Blanca Formations in Argentina.

== Geology and Stratigraphy ==
The Antarctic Peninsula has been traditionally interpreted as a native continental arc, yet more recent studies suggest it is a collection of terranes merged onto the Gondwana margin. In the Antarctic Peninsula and eastern Ellsworth Land, volcanic and plutonic rocks formed during the subduction of oceanic lithosphere, marking different periods of volcanic activity. These rocks, part of the Antarctic Peninsula Volcanic Group, range from Early Jurassic to Tertiary age and exhibit various facies and ages, though their relationships are not fully understood. The Mesozoic volcanic-sedimentary layers in the Ellsworth land sit atop older metamorphosed sedimentary rocks, like Ordovician to Permian basement on the Trinity Peninsula Group. Plutonic rocks, forming widespread outcrops, dominate the Antarctic Peninsula's igneous landscape, with their full extent and connectivity still not fully understood due to limited exposure and data availability. The Larsen & Latady Basins developed and where filled in the Early Jurassic as a result of rifting and arc extension during the early stages of the southern Gondwana break-up.

The Ellsworth Land Volcanic Group underlies parts of the southern Antarctic Peninsula and eastern Ellsworth Land. At Mount Poster, these volcanic rocks, up to 600 meters thick, and probably exceeds 2 kilometers in total thickness, yet is difficult to know. Ellsworth Land intertongues with the Sweeney Fm and is overlaid by the Latady Group, marked by intense folding, thrust faulting, and pluton intrusion during the Late Jurassic to Early Cretaceous period.

The Ellsworth Land VG shows considerable alteration and metamorphism, leading to challenges with volcanic sections correlation due to variations in rock types and minor faulting, with an estimated thickness of roughly 1000 meters in the Sweeney Mountains, where is present in most peaks, where is characterized by silicic ignimbrite, featuring diverse weathering patterns and lithology dominated by feldspar-rich ignimbrite. Additionally, it contains lithic-rich sections with quartzite fragments and traces of red mudstone, along with late-stage epidote and quartz veining. Well-consolidated units exhibit distinguishable fiamme, while less consolidated ignimbrites contain flattened pumices, occasionally found alongside deformed ignimbrites. The sedimentary facies are more typically tens of metres thick, with a maximum of ~300 m black finely laminated mudstone and sandstone.

=== Age ===
Analyses of intracaldera ignimbrites in the Mount Poster Formation yielded an age of 183.4 ± 1.4 Ma, around the same time as volcanic activity in other regions like Karoo-Ferrar. Zircon analysis were conducted on eight samples of silicic ignimbrite spanning from the Sweeney Mountains to Lyon Nunataks, with ages ranging from 185.2 ± 1.5 Ma to 177.5 ± 2.2 Ma, while detrital zircons from sedimentary rocks at Potter Peak West indicate again 183 ± 4 Ma. These findings indicate that volcanic activity began either slightly before or at the same time as the initial non-volcanic sedimentation in the Sweeney Formation. More recently, volcanic tuffs at Mount Peterson have been dated at 181.9 + 2.4 Ma and are likely correlated to the other sections.

== Paleoenvironment ==
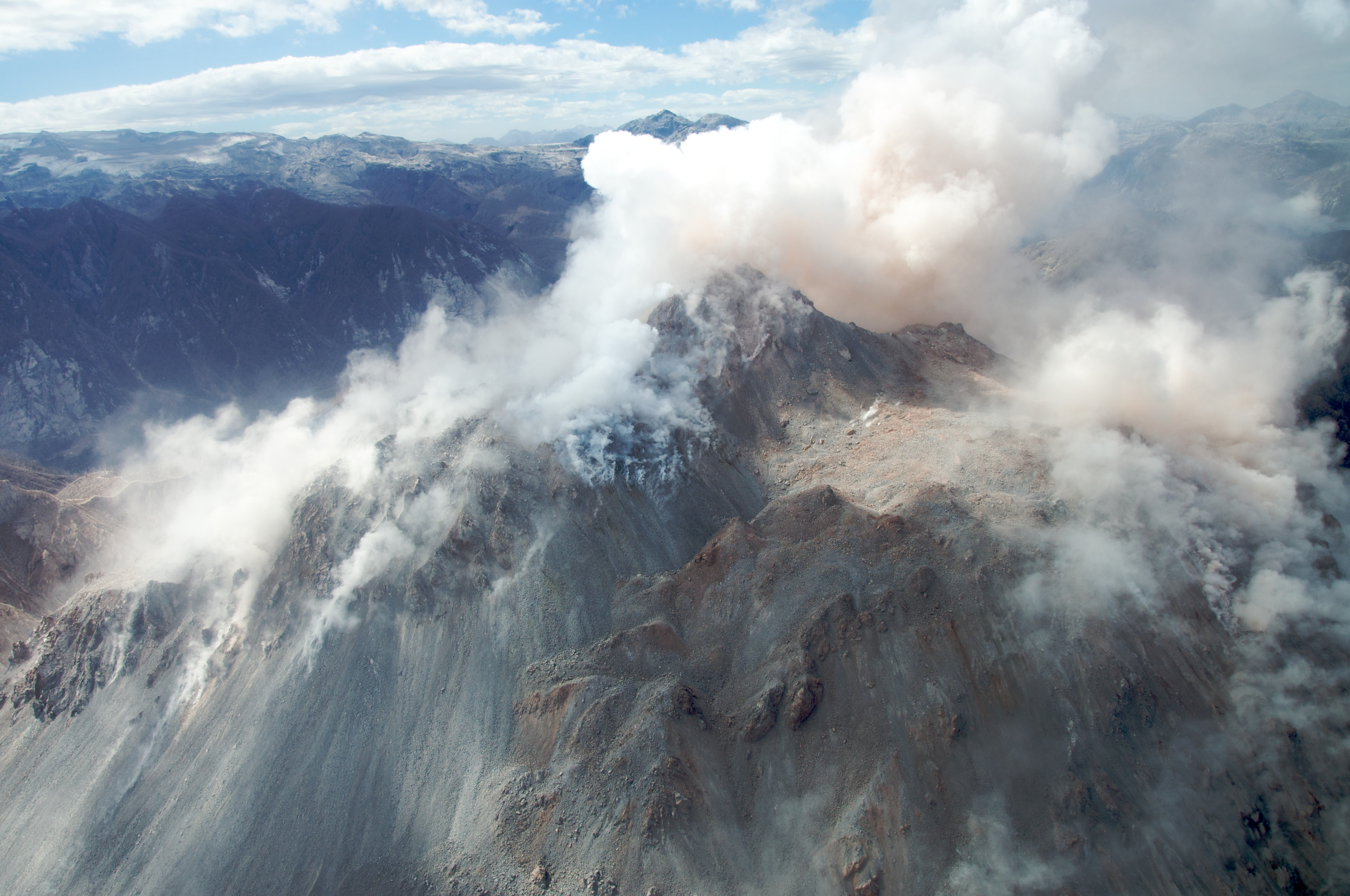
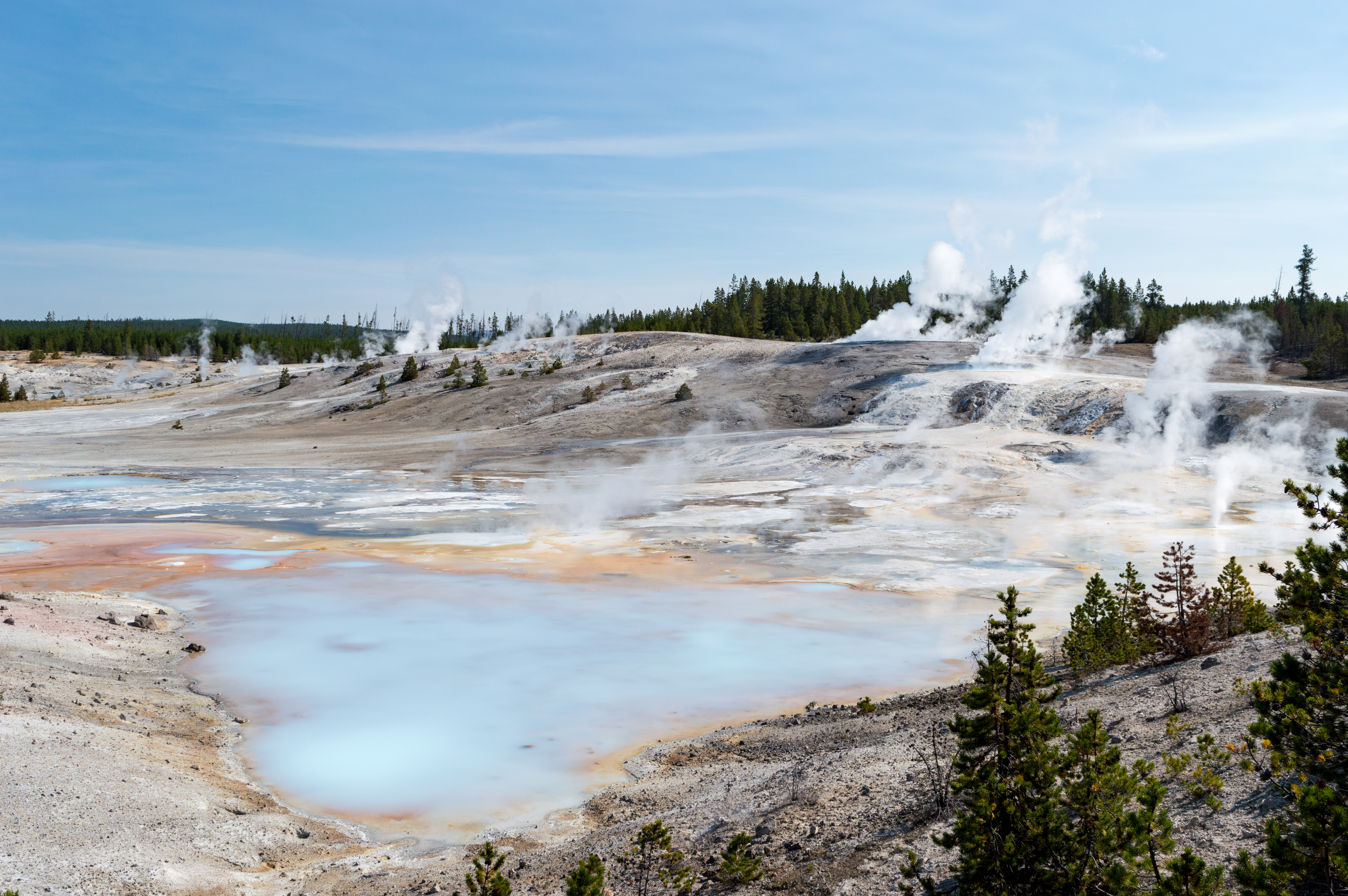
The ELVG was developed in a heavily volcanic landscape, with rhyolitic Caldera deposits of the Mount Poster (ex. Volcán Chaitén) associated with freshwater layers & disrupted vegetation of the Sweeney Fm (Yellowstone as example)

The Toarcian Latady Basin was bracketed between the Ellsworth-Whitmore block, that was located in the Paleopacific along the Marie Byrd Land, Thurston Island, the Antarctic Peninsula and Southern Patagonia, being either islands or a peninsular landmass connected with mainland South America. While there is a fit of the main surrounding continents and landmasses, the position of the inlet fragments along the Transantarctic margin of East Antarctica is complex. Local sediments where sourced mostly from the Mount Poster Caldera, followed by recycled-orogen materials. The Mount Poster Formation rhyodacitic ignimbrites emplaced in an intraplate, a major silicic flare-up within the Chon Aike Province setting in southern Palmer Land, influenced heavily by upper crustal melting, being supply to both the Atoll Nunataks Formation and parts of the Latady Group.

Local vulcanism was likely dominated by large-volume (Ultra-Plinian) eruptions, providing a potential rhyolitic volcanic source to nearby Transantarctic Area (ex. Mawson Formation). The Mount Poser layers suggests they were likely deposited within a Volcanic crater, indicated by similar composition, strong bonding, extensive layering, and the presence of faults and dykes around the edges that mark the boundaries of such crater, resembling units recovered in western United States and Alaska, where volcanic activity created similar landscapes. The differences seen on the layers might indicate different volcanic events from various centers, possibly forming a series of connected or nested craters. The sedimentary layers near the volcanic ones often show signs of heat damage or disturbance by the volcanics: red mudstone next to basaltic flows turns black, and disrupted bedding underlies lava bodies. Sedimentary layers mainly consist of well-sorted sandstone and siltstone with ripple patterns, suggesting deposition in freshwater, likely in a lacustrine body with associated subaerial fluvial units. Fossil plant remains indicate a terrestrial environment, with conifers dominating and suggesting a preference for volcanic-rich soil. Lacustrine layers with volcanic influence are recovered in the connected Cañadón Asfalto Formation.

== Fossil content ==
The fossil palaeoassemblage is dominated by plants, suggesting a fully terrestrial or lacustrine setting, without any marine evidence. The material is dominated by wood trunks and root horizons. The leaf-based macroflora is conifer-dominated and corresponds to genera recovered in the Argentinian Cañadón Asfalto Formation, where cuticular analysis of the same taxa suggests common environmental stress. This fits also with the local foliar remains, that are consistent with growth between eruptive phases.

=== Equisetales ===
Genus	Species	Location	Member	Material	Ecogroup	Palaeoclimate requirements	Notes	Images
Equisetites	E. lateralis	Mount Poster; Potter Peak	Mount Poster Formation; Sweeney Formation	Stems	Lowland and Riverside	Warm to temperate, relatively wet	Plants of the group Equisetales. Usually linked with riversides	Equisetites specimen

=== Pteridophyta ===
Genus	Species	Location	Member	Material	Ecogroup	Palaeoclimate requirements	Notes	Images
Cladophlebis	C. antarctica; C. gallantinensis	Mount Poster; Potter Peak	Mount Poster Formation; Sweeney Formation	Isolated Pinnae	Lowland and Riverside	Warm to temperate, relatively wet	Plants of the family Osmundaceae.	

=== Peltaspermales ===
Genus	Species	Location	Member	Material	Ecogroup	Palaeoclimate requirements	Notes	Images
Archangelskya	A. furcata	Potter Peak	Sweeney Formation	Isolated Pinnae	Lowland and Riverside	Warm, can withstand long periods of drought; seasonal climate	Plants of the group Pteridospermata	
Taeniopteris	T. sp.	Potter Peak	Sweeney Formation	Isolated Pinnae	Lowland and Riverside	Warm to temperate, relatively wet	Plants of the group Pentoxylales. Their liana-like anatomy has also led to suggestions of a habit similar to that of brambles	

=== Cycadeoidopsida ===
Genus	Species	Location	Member	Material	Ecogroup	Palaeoclimate requirements	Notes	Images
Zamites	Z. antarcticus	Potter Peak	Sweeney Formation	Leaflets	Lowland and Riverside	Warm to temperate, can withstand long periods of drought; seasonal climate	Affinities with Bennettitales inside Cycadeoidopsida.	

=== Coniferophyta ===
Genus	Species	Location	Member	Material	Ecogroup	Palaeoclimate requirements	Notes	Images
Brachyphyllum	B. spp.	Potter Peak West	Sweeney Formation	Branched shoots	Upland, Lowland and Riverside	?Warm to temperate, relatively wet	Plants of the family Araucariaceae or Cheirolepidiaceae	
Elatoclaudus	E. confertus	Potter Peak West	Sweeney Formation	Branched shoots	Upland and Lowland	Warm to temperate, can withstand long periods of drought; seasonal climate	Plants of the family Cupressaceae	
Pagiophyllum	P. divaricatum	Potter Peak West	Sweeney Formation	Branched shoots	Lowland and Coastal lake	Warm to temperate, can withstand long periods of drought; seasonal climate	Plants of the family Araucariaceae or Cheirolepidiaceae	

== See also ==
- List of fossiliferous stratigraphic units in Antarctica
- Shafer Peak Formation
- Mawson Formation
- Hanson Formation
- Shackleton Formation
- South Polar region of the Cretaceous
- Toarcian turnover
- Toarcian formations
  - Marne di Monte Serrone, Italy
  - Calcare di Sogno, Italy
  - Sachrang Formation, Austria
  - Posidonia Shale, Lagerstätte in Germany
  - Ciechocinek Formation, Germany and Poland
  - Krempachy Marl Formation, Poland and Slovakia
  - Lava Formation, Lithuania
  - Azilal Group, North Africa
  - Whitby Mudstone, England
  - Fernie Formation, Alberta and British Columbia
    - Poker Chip Shale
  - Whiteaves Formation, British Columbia
  - Navajo Sandstone, Utah
  - Los Molles Formation, Argentina
  - Kandreho Formation, Madagascar
  - Kota Formation, India
  - Cattamarra Coal Measures, Australia
