= EWM =

EWM may refer to:

- Edinburgh Woollen Mill, a British retailer
- Ellsworth–Whitmore Mountains, in Antarctica
- Exploding wire method
- European Women in Mathematics
