= Caraphlebia =

Caraphlebia Temporal range: Toarcian ~182–177 Ma

Scientific classification
- Kingdom: Animalia
- Phylum: Arthropoda
- Clade: Pancrustacea
- Class: Insecta
- Order: Odonata
- Family: †Selenothemistidae
- Genus: †Caraphlebia; Carpenter, 1969
- Species: †C. antarctica

Binomial name
- †Caraphlebia antarctica Carpenter, 1969

Extinct genus of insects

Caraphlebia is an extinct genus of dragonflies, known from the Early Jurassic Mawson Formation of Antarctica. It is one of the only named fossil insects from Antarctica that have been formally described; others include two beetles, Grahamelytron crofti and Ademosynoides antarctica, both from a Jurassic deposit on Mount Flora Formation. Caraphlebia is related to the genus Liassophlebia, but the hind wing has several weak antipodals in addition to the two strong, primary ones. In 2018, Caraphlebia was confirmed to be placed in the family Selenothemistidae.
