= List of fossiliferous stratigraphic units in the Falkland Islands =

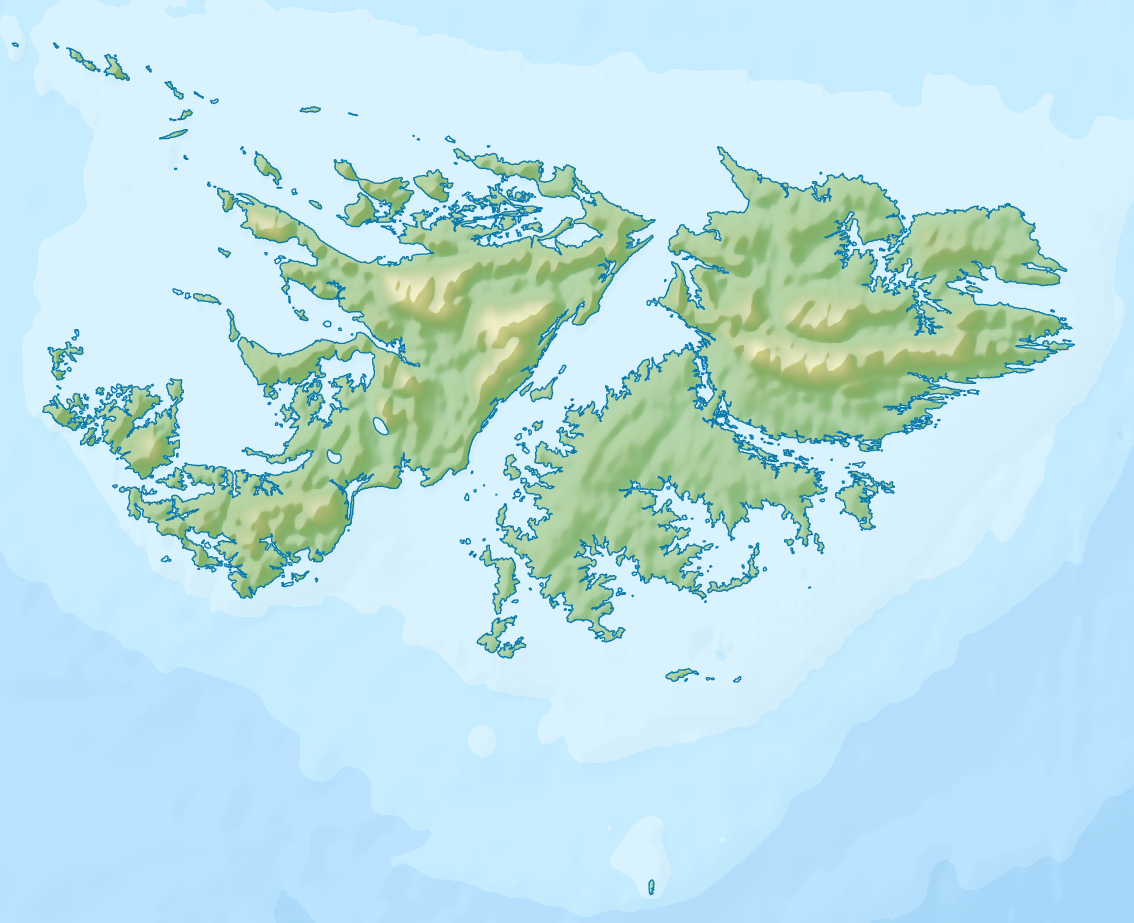
Fossiliferous stratigraphic units in the Falkland Islands
Permian
Fitzroy Tillite

This is a list of fossiliferous stratigraphic units in the Falkland Islands.

== List of fossiliferous stratigraphic units ==
Group	Formation	Period	Notes
	Bay of Harbours Formation	Wuchiapingian	
	Brenton Loch Formation	Capitanian	
Isla Soledao Group	B. Choiseul Formation	Sakmarian	
	Fitzroy Tillite	Early Cambrian	

== See also ==
- List of fossiliferous stratigraphic units in Antarctica
