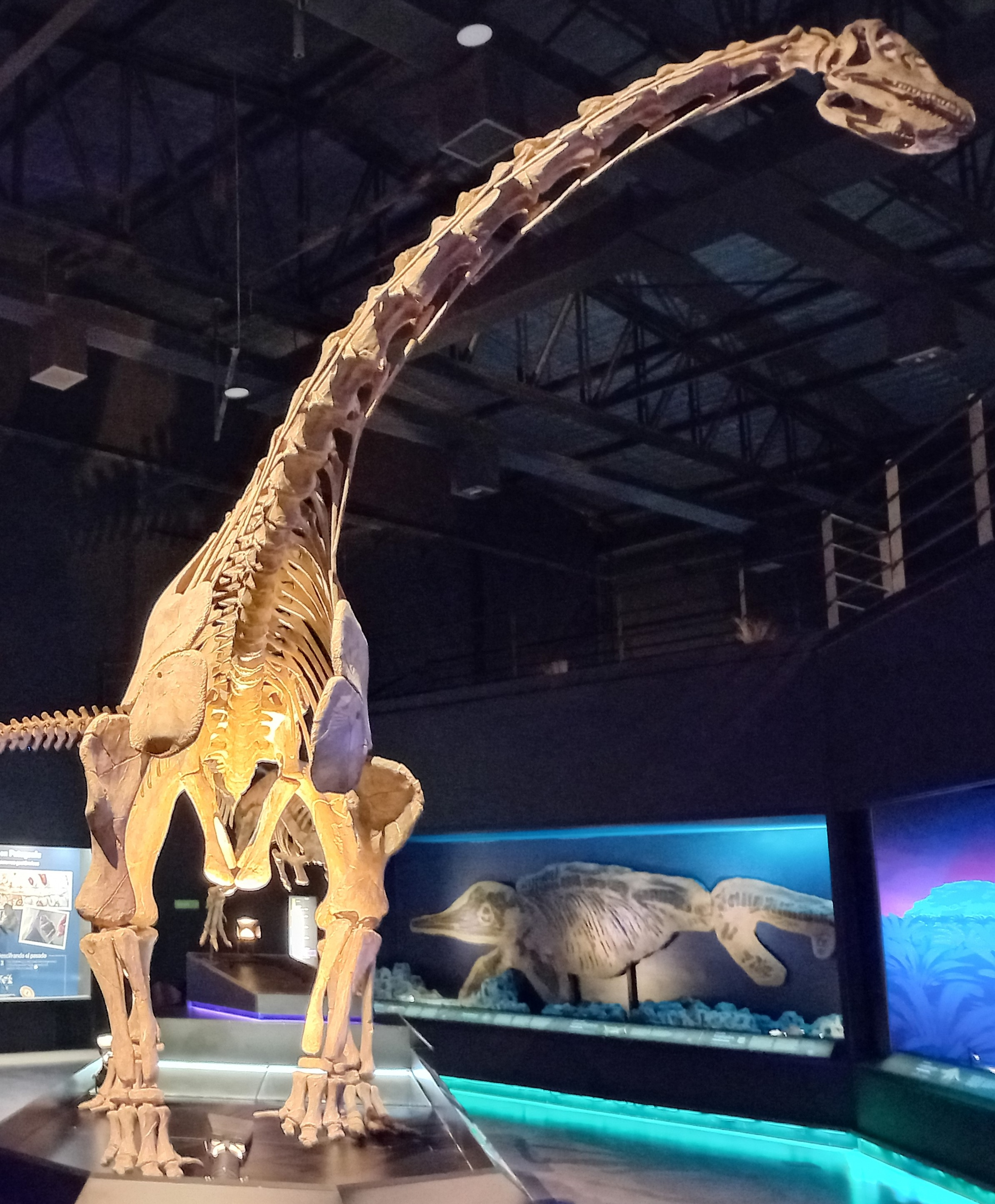
- Skeleton of Bagualia at the Museo Paleontológico Egidio Feruglio

Scientific classification
- Kingdom: Animalia
- Phylum: Chordata
- Class: Reptilia
- Clade: Dinosauria
- Clade: Saurischia
- Clade: †Sauropodomorpha
- Clade: †Sauropoda
- Clade: †Eusauropoda
- Genus: †Bagualia; Pol et al., 2020

Type species
- †Bagualia alba Pol et al., 2020

= Bagualia =

Bagualia Temporal range: Early Jurassic (middle Toarcian), ~179.17 Ma

Genus of sauropod dinosaurs

Bagualia (meaning "wild horse") is an extinct genus of eusauropod dinosaur from the Early Jurassic (middle Toarcian) Cañadón Asfalto Formation in what is now the Chubut Province of Argentina. The type species, B. alba, was formally described in 2020. Bagualia represents the oldest known definitive eusauropod, and due to the completeness of its material, it represents one of the most important taxa for understanding the early evolution of the group.

== Discovery and naming ==
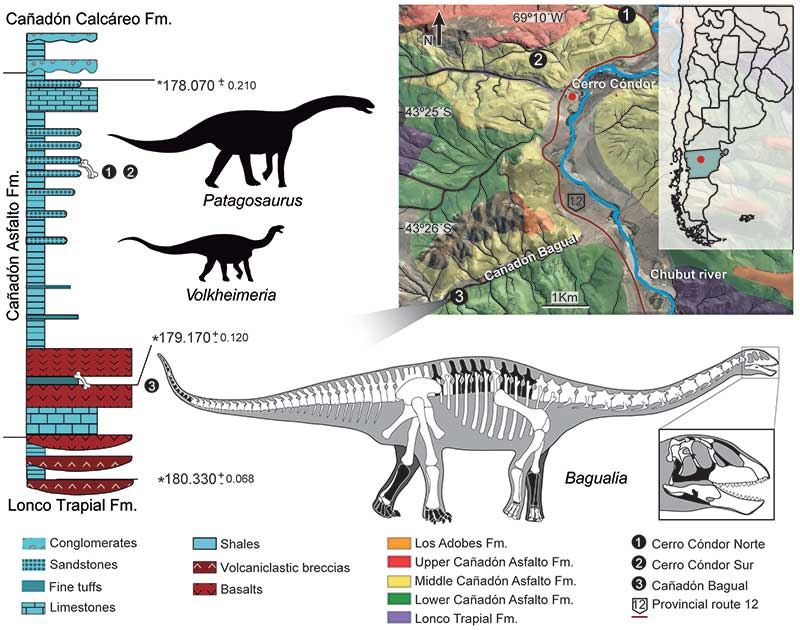
Location map and stratigraphic distribution of the main sauropods of the Cañadón Asfalto Formation

The Bagualia fossil material was discovered in Bagual Canyon, approximately 4.3 kilometres (2.7 mi) from Cerro Cóndor in Chubut, Argentina within the Early Jurassic deposits of the Cañadón Asfalto Formation. The fossils were excavated by the Museo Paleontológico Egidio Feruglio during fieldwork in 2007 and 2009. The remains were embedded in a dark grey pelitic matrix rich in organic matter. This layer, dated precisely to around 179 million years ago, formed in a lacustrine environment beneath a basaltic layer. The fossils include the holotype, MPEF-PV 3301 (a partial skull with cervical vertebrae), and additional remains from at least three individuals (MPEF-PV 3305–3348).

The generic name, Bagualia comes from "bagual," the Spanish word for "wild horse," referencing the specimens' discovery in the Bagual Canyon ("Cañadón Bagual"). The specific name, alba, is a Spanish word meaning "dawn," highlighting the dinosaur's early age in the sauropod lineage.

== Description ==
Bagualia is known from many bones from three individuals, including vertebrae from the neck, back, and tail, limb and girdle bones, as well as skull and teeth fragments. The size of Bagualia was likely brought on by a newly formed ecosystem and climate shifts, which were all caused by volcanic activity in the Southern Hemisphere during the Early Jurassic. While the harsh climate and ashes drove most sauropodomorphs to extinction, Bagualia was able to adapt to newly sprouted conifers and plants, using its long neck to snip plant matter from them while staying in place, conserving energy. Its teeth are surrounded by a thick layer of enamel, roughly seven times thicker than other extinct herbivores, enabling the animal to better shear conifer leaves. The digestive system of Bagualia was also a likely reason why it grew to such a large size, and another function of its long neck has been proposed: it may have dissipated heat in a similar fashion to how elephants use their ears.

=== Skull ===
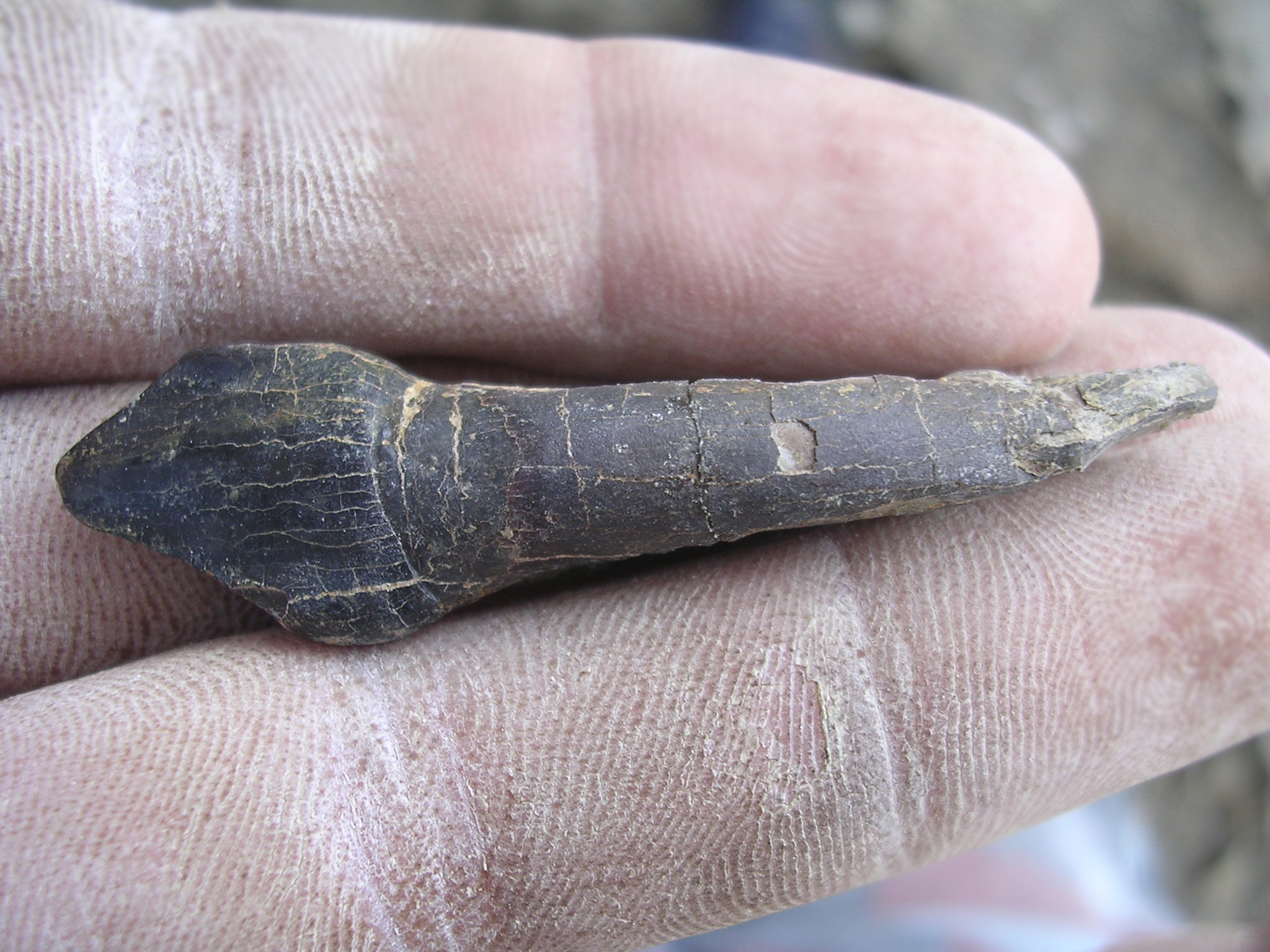
Tooth of Bagualia collected during excavation

The skull of Bagualia is relatively complete. The premaxilla is robust and nearly complete with a tall, lateromedially compressed structure, with a smooth lateral surface with several foramina, and its anterior margin lacks a step. A beak-like process is present at the anteroventral end, unique to Bagualia, which may have supported a larger keratinous structure. The maxilla of Bagualia shows 13 alveoli, with some teeth preserved in varying stages of eruption. It has a prominent premaxillary process and a deep narial fossa. Although the ascending process of the maxilla is missing, the antorbital fenestra and lacrimal processes are well-defined. The maxilla articulates with the jugal and palatine, but lacks contact with the ectopterygoid. The right nasal has a broad but damaged articulation with the frontal and a thinner connection with the prefrontal. The lacrimal is robust and dorsoventrally tall, with distinct articulations for the jugal, maxilla, prefrontal, and nasal, similar to other sauropods like Camarasaurus and Turiasaurus. The rhomboid-shaped left prefrontal features prominent articular facets for the lacrimal, nasal, and frontal bones, characterised by its elongated shape and triangular cross-section. The postorbital forms the posterior and posterodorsal boundaries of the orbit, featuring a slender ventral process typical of early sauropodomorphs. The robust squamosals have four articulating processes, with the longest ventral process contributing to an 'S'-shaped profile.

The braincase is nearly complete and ossified, showcasing a robust and tall structure similar to other eusauropods. It features limited cranial pneumaticity and lacks certain recesses, with an elliptical foramen magnum dorsoventrally oriented, contrasting with the circular shape seen in many non-sauropod sauropodomorphs. The paroccipital process is laterally projected, with a unique morphology that differs from other sauropodomorphs. In the Endocranium, pituitary gland hypertrophy supports its link to increasing body size, aligning with trends in later large-bodied sauropods. The floccular lobe is reduced in Bagualia, consistent with a shift to low-agility, quadrupedal locomotion, shared with later eusauropods. Its inner ear anatomy, particularly the shortened and widened semicircular canals, reflects reduced agility and a stable posture. Bagualia shows a moderate sense of smell, more developed than in latter sauropods but less than in predatory sauropodomorphs. Its encephalization quotient is similar to Spinophorosaurus, suggesting moderate brain activity, possibly aided by a well-developed venous system.

The right dentary has 16 alveoli and shows an emerging tooth, while the left dentary has 14 alveoli with five partially erupted teeth. Notably, these dentaries exhibit a U-shaped configuration characteristic of eusauropods, featuring unique structural traits, including well-developed alveoli and a prominent coronoid process on the surangular. The teeth are spoon-shaped with heavily wrinkled enamel, displaying asymmetrical mesial and distal margins, characteristic of many sauropodomorphs, with notable features like a medial convex area and a procumbent arrangement typical of eusauropods. Numerous small pores on the ventral margin, along with little wear on the first erupted tooth, may indicate a vascular function, possibly supporting a keratin-like covering.

=== Axial skeleton ===
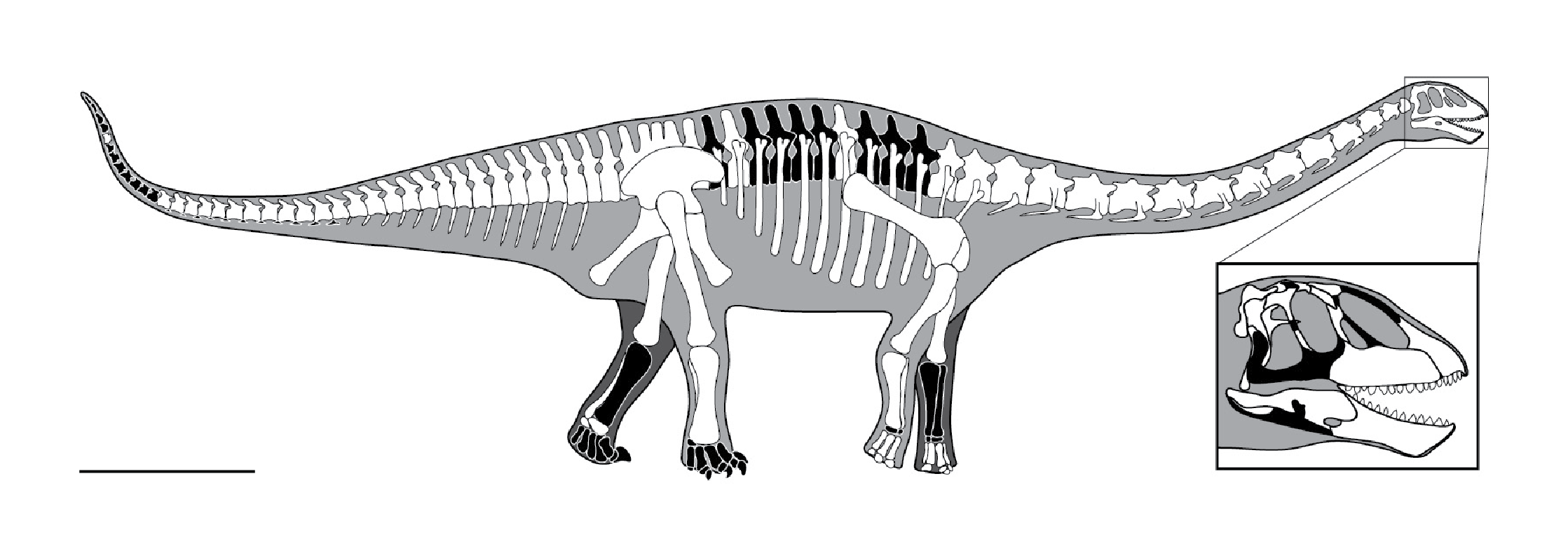
Reconstructed skeleton of Bagualia alba. Preserved bones in white and missing elements in black

Bagualia's appendicular skeleton provides key insights into the evolution of Eusauropoda. It exhibits a well-developed acromion process, deeper acromion fossa, and a straight humerus with a low deltopectoral crest, indicating adaptations for a graviportal lifestyle. The humerus and femur show increased eccentricity, reinforcing resistance to bending forces in large-bodied sauropods. A deep radial fossa in the ulna and changes in metacarpal proportions highlight the transition to obligate quadrupedalism. The laterally projecting cnemial crest of the tibia and a wedge-shaped astragalus suggest refinements in locomotion. These features mark Bagualia as a pivotal taxon in the shift towards the massive, quadrupedal build of later sauropods.

All cervical vertebrae exhibit an opisthocoelous structure, featuring elongated centra and a ventral keel. The recovered proatlas is robust and rhomboid in shape, while the atlas is distinguished by its elongated neurapophyses. The axis reveals notable features, such as deep lateral fossae and a prominent neural arch, indicating the holotype likely belonged to a subadult individual. Cervical ribs feature a tetraradiate shape at their proximal ends, characterized by a prominent tuberculum, capitulum, and anterior process, along with a long, slender shaft directed posteriorly, consistent with most sauropods.

The preserved dorsal vertebrae, unlike the cervical vertebrae, exhibit more developed zygapophyses, apophyses, and bony laminae. The parapophyses shift from the mid-length of the centrum in the anterior dorsal vertebrae to the neural arch starting from the third dorsal vertebra, a characteristic found in all sauropods. The dorsal ribs are represented by various isolated fragments that cannot be accurately matched.

The pelvic girdle is compressed and misaligned, with left elements shifted posteriorly relative to the right. The sacrum, composed of five vertebrae, has fused sacral ribs, with variations in development and orientation. The neural spines are plate-like and lack lateral fossae, differing from those of some other sauropods, and are fused and posteriorly curved. The sacral ribs are positioned away from the acetabulum, indicating a non-sauropod sauropodomorph structure.

The caudal vertebrae demonstrate distinguishing characteristics including the elongation index, neural spine inclination, and transverse process development. The anterior caudal vertebrae display distinct morphology with amphicoelous centra and well-developed transverse processes, while the middle vertebrae are more elongated with marked articular facets for haemal arches. In the posterior caudal vertebrae, the centra are significantly longer than tall, lacking transverse processes and lateral fossae, with decreasing neural spine angles observed towards the tail's end. The haemal arches contain a canal that occupies roughly 20% of the overall chevron length, exhibiting differences when analyzed alongside other eusauropod lineages. Their concave surfaces, extended ventral blades, and central ridges align with characteristics observed in multiple sauropod taxa. Additionally, the posterior haemal arches tend to become shorter and thicker at their distal ends.

== Classification ==
Bagualia is considered to be an early member of Eusauropoda. Due to its provenance from the Cañadon Asfalto Formation, which is dated to the Toarcian, its describers interpret this as evidence of a eusauropod dominance after an Early Jurassic global warming event, replacing more basal sauropodomorphs. Successive phylogenetic analyses from 2020, 2021, and 2024 have confirmed a close relationship between Bagualia, Nebulasaurus, Patagosaurus, and Spinophorosaurus. The results of Gomez et al. (2024) are shown in the cladogram below:

- Sauropoda
  - Antetonitrus
  - - Ingentia
    - Lessemsaurus
  - - Ledumahadi
    - Pulanesaura
    - - - Gongxianosaurus
        - Amygdalodon
        - NHMUK PVR 36834
      - - Archaeodontosaurus
        - Volkheimeria
        - Sanpasaurus
        - Vulcanodon
        - Tazoudasaurus
        - Eusauropoda
          - Shunosaurus
          - - Barapasaurus
            - - - Patagosaurus
                - - Bagualia
                  - - Nebulasaurus
                    - Spinophorosaurus
              - - Tonganosaurus
                - - Mamenchisauridae
                  - - Cetiosaurus
                    - - Turiasauria
                      - - Jobaria
                        - Neosauropoda

== Palaeobiology ==
=== Palaeoecology ===
Bagualia has important paleoecological implications due to its robust skull and broad teeth, which indicate a shift towards bulk browsing on tough vegetation, such as conifers from families like Araucariaceae, Cheirolepidiaceae, and Cupressaceae after the Toarcian Oceanic Anoxic Event, what may have been a key for their success after local environmental change. This adaptation allowed it to process fibrous plant material, reflecting its capacity to exploit new dietary resources during the end of the Early Jurassic. The features of Bagualia highlight a key evolutionary step between early sauropodomorphs and derived eusauropods, suggesting significant ecological interactions as environments changed.

Bagualia had broad-crowned teeth, suggesting it fed on tougher vegetation, distinct from sauropods like Patagosaurus with thinner crowns. This dental variation indicates niche partitioning, reducing competition by targeting different food sources. The environment supported diverse vegetation, enabling Bagualia to exploit specific resources, possibly at different feeding heights, within a competitive ecosystem. The presence of a tall skull with robust jaws and increase in the number of replacement teeth further supports the ability to consume tough plants. Additionally, the thickness of the enamel in Bagualia was about 24% greater on the labial side of the tooth relative to the lingual side, and the enamel thickness varied depending on a tooth's position in the tooth row, with the posterior teeth having thicker enamel than the anterior teeth; in Patagosaurus, the opposite pattern is observed. This indicates that the teeth further back in the tooth row in Bagualia were better suited for withstanding high stresses produced by mastication compared to those of Patagosaurus.

== Paleoenvironment ==
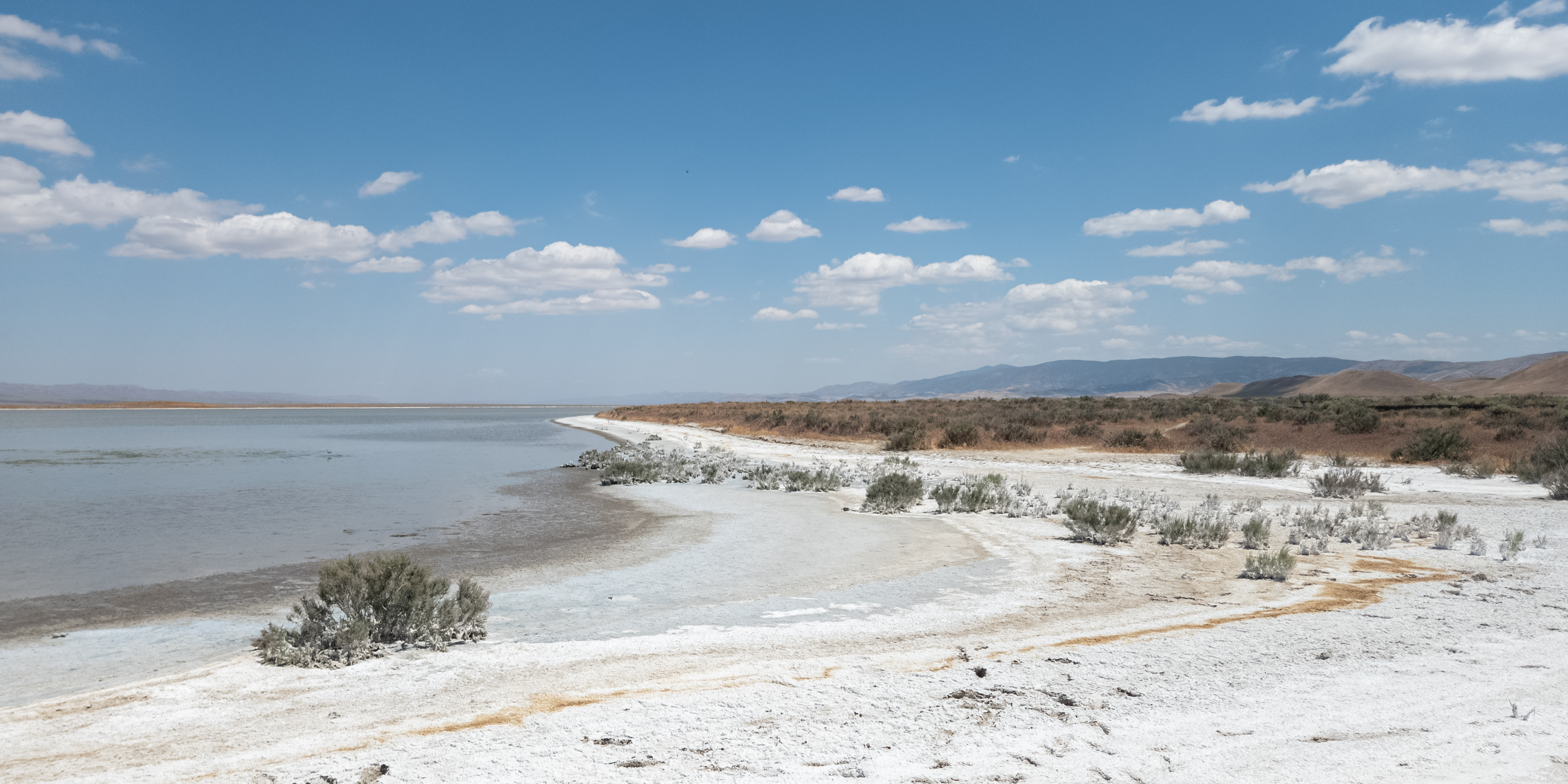
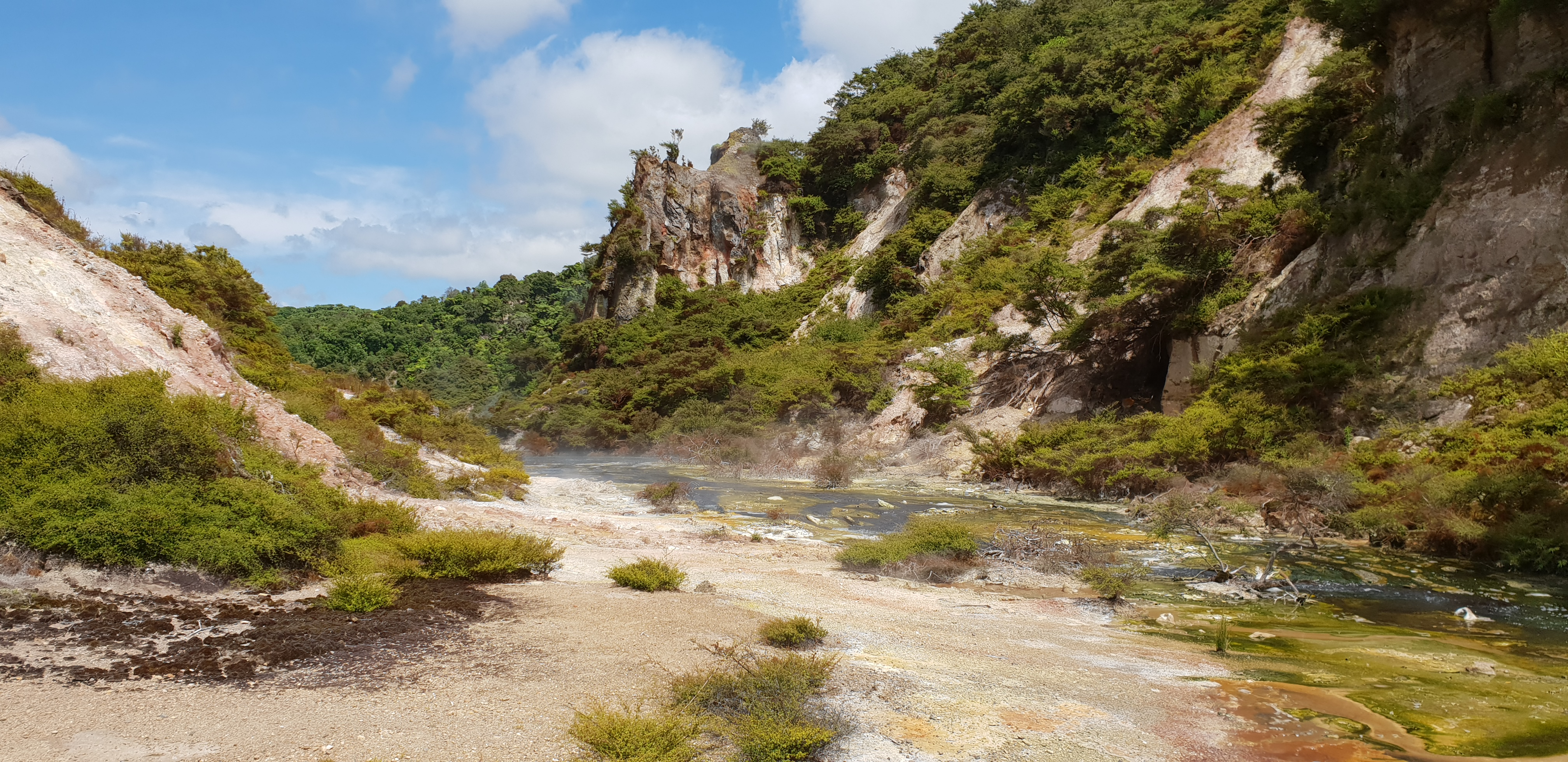
The Chacritas Member hosted volcanic-influenced soda lake (Example from modern California), while nearby environments hosted varied floral belts from coastal Cheirolepidaceous forests to highland Podocarps (Modern Equivalent from New Zealand), a rift area with nearby volcanic influence of the Chon Aike Province

The holotype of Bagualia comes from the Chacritas Member of the Cañadón Asfalto Formation. This member is mostly made up of two major depositional settings: lacustrine and fluvial deposits. Both of these have intervals of tuffaceous materials, suggesting the presence of volcanic activity. Palustrine littoral environment levels are seen at Cerro Cóndor and Estancia Fossati, characterized by the presence of lacustrine limestones interbedded with shales, tuffs and sandstones. The lacustrine section has been called the "Chacritas Paleolake", and seems to have been a rather saline or even hypersaline hydrologically closed pan lake, shallow in depth, with marginal zones and palustrine subenvironments made of low-energy ramp-like margins.

In addition to the Bagualia fossils, the site also yielded remains of different conifer families, turtle fossils, and teeth from at least four theropod dinosaurs. The presence of these diverse remains, mixed in the sediment, suggests a rich and complex ecosystem during the Early Jurassic period.
