= List of fossiliferous stratigraphic units in Antarctica =

Fossiliferous stratigraphic units in Antarctica
Pliocene
Miocene
Paleogene
Late Cretaceous
Early Cretaceous
Late Jurassic
Early Jurassic
Triassic
Permian
Carboniferous
Devonian
Cambrian

This is a list of fossiliferous stratigraphic units in Antarctica.

== List of fossiliferous stratigraphic units ==
Supergroup	Group	Formation	Period
	Sorsdal Formation	Zanclean	
	Heidemann Valley Trench Formation	Pliocene	
	Destruction Bay Formation	Early Miocene	
Sirius Group	Meyer Desert Formation - biota	Middle Miocene	
	Cape Melville Formation	Miocene	
	Polonez Cove Formation	Oligocene-Pliocene	
	Bay Formation	Chattian	
	Fildes Formation	Eocene	
	Cross Valley Formation	Late Cretaceous-Late Paleocene	
Seymour Island Group	La Meseta Formation	Ypresian-Priabonian	
Seymour Island Group	López de Bertodano Formation	Maastrichtian-Danian	
Marambio Group	López de Bertodano Formation	Maastrichtian-Danian	
Marambio Group	Sobral Formation	Santonian-Danian	
Marambio Group	Snow Hill Island Formation	Campanian-Maastrichtian	
Marambio Group	Santa Marta Formation	Santonian-Campanian	
	Zamek Formation	Campanian-Maastrichtian	
	Half Three Point Formation	Campanian-Maastrichtian	
Gustav Group	Hidden Lake Formation	Coniacian-Santonian	
Gustav Group	Whisky Bay Formation	Albian-Coniacian	
Gustav Group	Kotick Point Formation	Aptian-Albian	
Fossil Bluff Group	Triton Point Formation	Late Albian	
Fossil Bluff Group	Neptune Glacier Formation	Late Albian	
Fossil Bluff Group	Pluto Glacier Formation	Late Aptian-Albian	
Fossil Bluff Group	Himalia Ridge Formation	Tithonian-Berriasian	
	Cerro Negro Formation	Aptian	
	Lagrelius Point Formation	Early Aptian	
	Pedersen Formation	Early Aptian	
	Spartan Glacier Formation	Valanginian-Aptian	
Byers Group	Chester Cone Formation	Berriasian-Valanginian	
Byers Group	President Beaches Formation	Berriasian	
Byers Group	Devils Point Formation	Tithonian-Berriasian	
	Anchorage Formation	Tithonian-Berriasian	
	Ameghino Formation	Kimmeridgian-Berriasian	
	Ablation Point Formation	Kimmeridgian	
Latady Group	Hauberg Mountains Formation	Callovian-Tithonian	
Ellsworth Land Volcanic Group	Mount Poster Formation	Toarcian	
Ellsworth Land Volcanic Group	Sweeney Formation	Toarcian	
Botany Bay Group	Mount Flora Formation	Bathonian	
Botany Bay Group	Camp Hill Formation	Early Jurassic	
	Carapace Formation	Toarcian	
	Selene Nunatak Formation	Pliensbachian-Toarcian	
Victoria Group	Hanson Formation	Hettangian-Pliensbachian	
	Lashly Formation	Carnian	
Beacon Supergroup	Fremouw Formation	Early-Late Triassic	
Beacon Supergroup	Buckley Formation	Capitanian	
Beacon Supergroup	Takrouna Formation	Sakmarian	
	Mount Glossopteris Formation	Lopingian	
	Bainmedart Coal Measures	Wordian	
	Polarstar Formation	Guadalupian	
	Radock Formation	Kungurian	
	Weller Coal Measures	Artinskian	
LeMay Group	Lully Foothills Formation	Sinemurian	
LeMay Group	Mount King Formation	Serpukhovian-Bashkirian	
Taylor Group	Aztec Siltstone	Middle-Late Devonian	
Taylor Group	Beacon Heights Orthoquartzite	Middle-Late Devonian	
Crashsite Group	Mount Wyatt Earp Formation	Early Devonian	
	Horlick Formation	Early Devonian	
	Minaret Formation	Guzhangian-Cambrian Stage 10	
	Nelson Limestone	Guzhangian	
	Spurs Formation	Wuliuan-Drumian	
	Taylor Formation	Wuliuan	
	Schneider Hills Limestone	Cambrian Stage 3-Stage 4	
	Cape Melville Formation	Cambrian Stage 3	
Byrd Group	Shackleton Limestone	Cambrian Stage 3	
	Mount Spann Formation	Cambrian Stage 2-Guzhangian	

== See also ==
- Geology of Antarctica
- List of fossiliferous stratigraphic units in Namibia
- List of fossiliferous stratigraphic units in South Africa
- List of fossiliferous stratigraphic units in the Falkland Islands
