= Lashly Formation =

Geologic formation in Antarctica

- Stratigraphic range: Carnian; ~235–222 Ma
- Type: Geological formation

Lithology
- Primary: Sandstone, mudstone
- Other: Conglomerate, siltstone

Location
- Coordinates: 77.2°S 160.1°E
- Approximate paleocoordinates: 66.7°S 86.6°E
- Region: Victoria Land
- Country: Ross Dependency
- Lashly Formation (Antarctica)

The Lashly Formation is a Late Triassic (Carnian) geologic formation in Victoria Land of the Ross dependency in Antarctica. The formation has provided fossil flora and indeterminate reptiles and dicynodonts.

Tuff found in combination with Dicroidium fragments were interpreted as the result of a forest fire during the Triassic.

== Description ==
The Lashly Formation comprises carbonaceous mudstones and conglomeratic sandstones deposited in channels and on floodplains of a meandering fluvial environment.

Lashly member C consists of fining-upward cycles of medium- to fine-grained sandstone grading upward into carbonaceous siltstone and mudstone, and thin coal beds. Quartz pebbles and cobbles and mudstone clasts occur near the base of major sandstone units. Irregular lenses of coal occur along bedding planes and over large scours. Dicroidium fronds and other plant fragments are common in carbonaceous beds.

== Fossil content ==
The following fossils have been reported from the formation:

- Therapsids
  - Dicynodontia indet.
- Reptiles
  - Reptilia indet.
- Flora
  - Craterisporites rotundus
  - Playfordiaspora crenulata
  - Alisporites spp.
  - Aratrisporites spp.
  - Dicroidium sp.
  - Uvaesporites spp.

== See also ==
- List of fossiliferous stratigraphic units in Antarctica
- Fremouw Formation
