= Ellsworth–Whitmore Mountains =

The Ellsworth–Whitmore Mountains (EWM) is the innermost of the four or five allochthonous terranes, or tectonic blocks, that form West Antarctica. EWM was located in an embayment off Natal, South Africa, before the break-up of Gondwana during which it was rotated 90° anticlockwise. The EWM is named for the Ellsworth and Whitmore mountain ranges.

The EWM was deformed during Gondwanan Late Permian–Late Jurassic orogenic events and is underlain by Grenvillan crust that much older than the amalgamation of Gondwana. A 90° anticlockwise rotation of the EWM during the Gondwana break-up is supported by palaeomagnetic data from several primary remanences: the Late Cambrian Frazier Ridge Formation and the Nash Hills.

The origin of the crustal blocks of West Antarctica and Zealandia remained enigmatic for decades largely because of their locations on the Pacific margin of Gondwana from where they were transported large distances. The EWM formed part of Gondwana's southern margin, Earth's longest and most long-lived active margin. Stretching from South America over South Africa, West Antarctica, Victoria Land, New Zealand, and Eastern Australia, this margin was the location of the 18,000 km (11,000 mi)-long Terra Australis orogeny that began during the Neoproterozoic break-up of Rodinia and culminated in the closure of the Adamastor and Mozambique oceans. During the Palaeozoic the central part of the southern margin, EWM together with the Sierra de la Ventana (Argentina) and the Cape Fold Belt (South Africa), was a passive margin.
