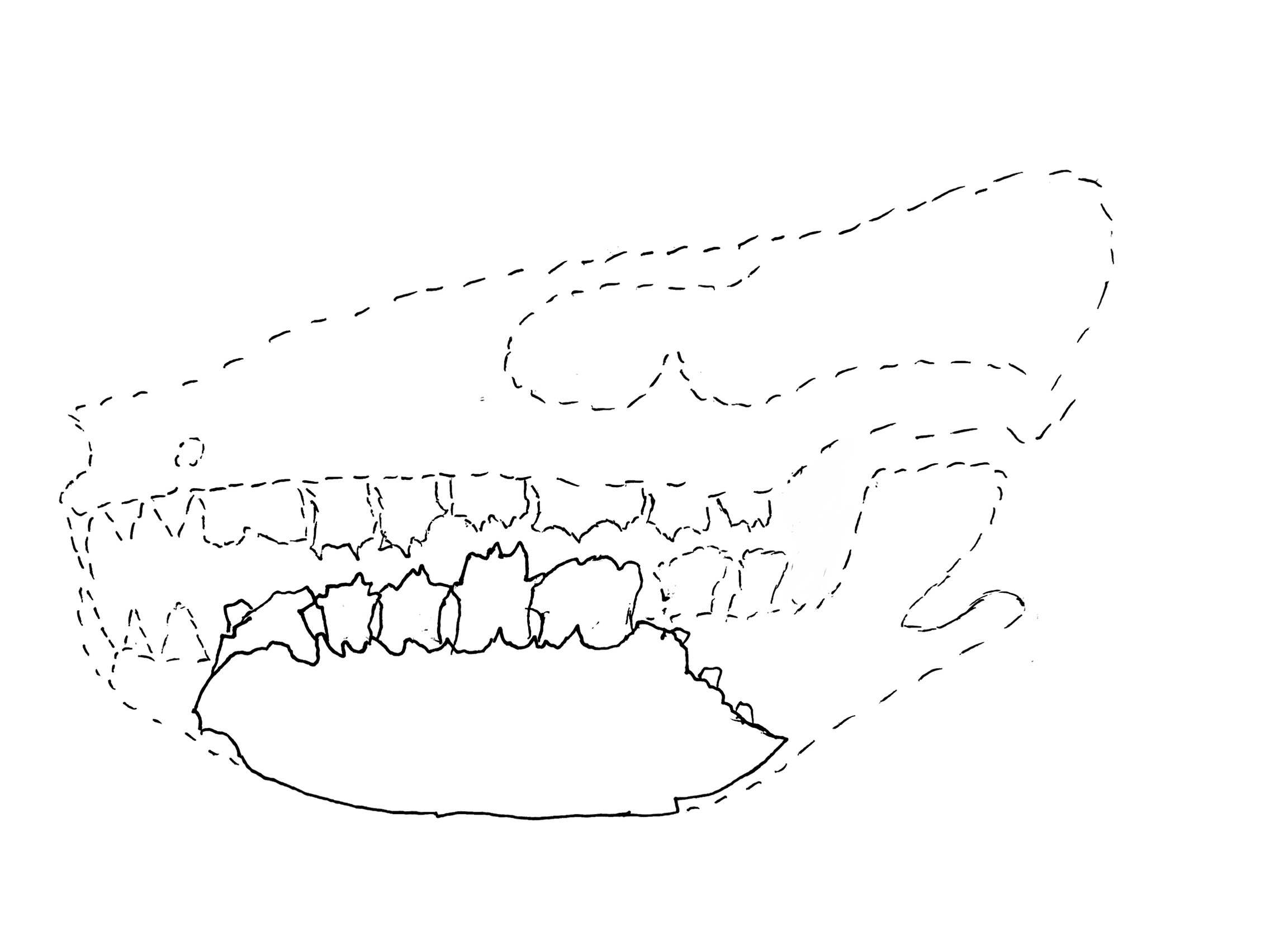
- Preserved portions of Klamelia and speculative skull

Scientific classification
- Kingdom: Animalia
- Phylum: Chordata
- Class: Mammalia
- Order: †Eutriconodonta
- Family: †Klameliidae
- Genus: †Klamelia; Chow and Rich, 1984
- Species: †K. zhaopengi

Binomial name
- †Klamelia zhaopengi Chow and Rich, 1984

= Klamelia =

Klamelia Temporal range: Middle Jurassic, 175–162 Ma

Genus of extinct mammal

Klamelia, named after the district in which it was found, is an extinct eutriconodontan in the family Klameliidae. It is known from Late Jurassic (Oxfordian age) rocks of northwestern China. Klamelia was described in 1984 and is known from highly fragmentary remains, with only a dentary and some of its associated teeth being found. There is only one accepted species of Klamelia, K. zhaopengi, which is named after Zhao Xijin and Peng Xiling, paleontologists who collected the holotype specimen.

== Discovery ==
The remains of Klamelia were discovered by Zhao Xijin in 1980. It was found in basal section of the Shishugou Group in Xinjiang province of China. Chow and Rich described Klamelia in 1984. The type specimen, IVPP V6447, is the property of the Institute of Vertebrate Paleontology and Paleoanthropology in Beijing. Despite another attempt to find fossils in the area in 2003, no more remains of Klamelia have been discovered.

== Description ==
Klamelia is distinguished from other Eutriconodonts by having at least six lower molars, fusion of the mandible extending to below the point of contact between the second and third molars, and the furthest back premolar significantly larger than the second molar. Klamelia is also distinguished from basal mammaliaformes by significant differences in their teeth compared to more basal mammaliaformes.

=== Mandible ===
The mandible displays characteristics which suggests that it was shortened; the first being that the posterior border of the mandibular fusion only stops below the second and the third molar and the second being that the posterior region of the midline symphysis is steeply inclined. The second characteristic indicates that the mandible did not extend much further than the last premolar. Therefore, there would be a reduced number of molars in the jaw, just like in Gobiconodon.

=== Teeth ===
The teeth increase in size in the posterior portions of the mandible. There are four large cusps on the teeth which are arranged in a straight line, however this could be in part due to warping during fossilization. The third cusp, going from front to back, is the largest by a wide margin. The next largest cusp is the second, with the fourth being slightly smaller. The shortest in the frontmost cusp. Ridges of enamel on the tongue side of the tooth are large and continuous on the molars. Ridges of enamel on the cheek side of the tooth are only well developed at the front and back of the molars. The molars overlap each other slightly. To accommodate this, each molar is rotated slightly.

== Classification ==
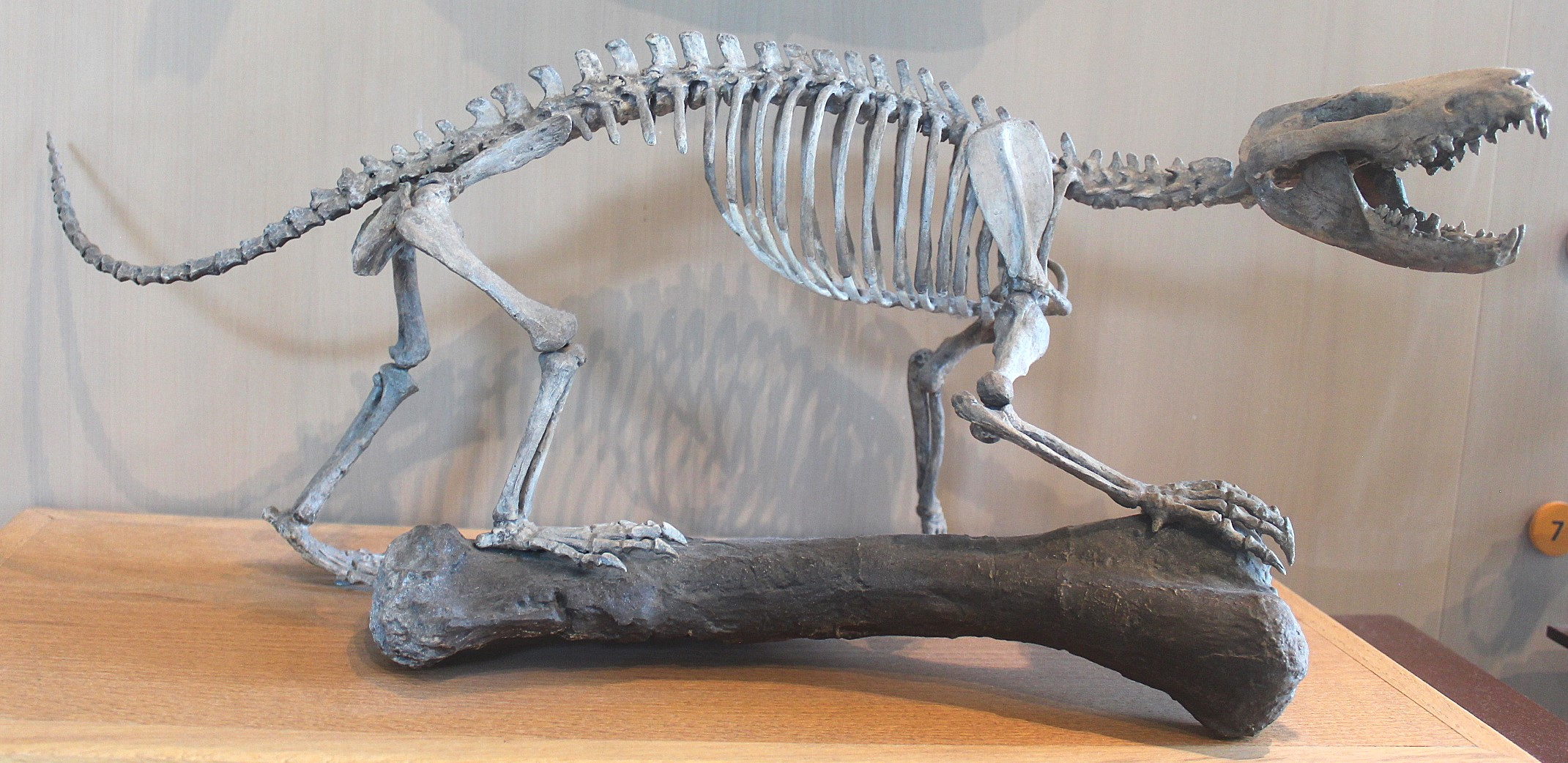
Cast of the skeleton of Gobiconodon, a relative of Klamelia

When Chow and Rich described Klamelia, they determined it to be closely related to Gobiconodon due to various synapomorphies, notably the shortening of the mandible and reduction of pre-molar teeth to six or less. Thus, they created the new subfamily Gobiconodontidae to include Gobiconodon, Guchinodon (now Gobiconodon), and Klamelia. Jenkins and Schaff (1988) subsequently changed Gobiconodontinae from subfamily to family status, but excluded Klamelia from the family in their description of Gobiconodon ostromi. Rougier et al. (2001) found that Klamelia was a mammaliaform of uncertain position after discovering Gobiconodon hopsoni. Klamelia was found to be a mammaliaform, however, primarily because of the reassessment of Gobiconodontidae as mammaliaformes. They also noted that the foreshortening of the mandible noted by Chow and Rich to be an indicator of derived features could be incorrect if the last premolar was, as they determined it, a double-rooted canine. In 2004, Kielan Jaworowska et al. corroborated the findings of Jenkins and Schaff, finding Klamelia to be a basal eutriconodontid.

When Klamelia was described, Chow and Rich created the subfamily Gobiconodontinae. They found Klamelia to be the most derived member due to the shortening of the jaw, but they also found it to be the youngest member of Gobiconodontidae. Chow and Rich found Gobiconodontinae to be a basal clade within Triconodonta (now known as Eutriconodonta), and it was subsequently placed within Amphilestidae.

After the description of Ferganodon in 2006 by Martin and Averianov, the position of Klamelia was reassessed. Because Ferganodon and Klamelia have many synapomorphies in their teeth, most notably the teeth being shaped roughly as a parallelogram, Ferganodon was placed as the closest ancestor to Klamelia, and the new family Klameliidae was erected. The study which described Ferganodon found that it contained more plesiomorphies than Klamelia and consequently placed it as the more basal member of Klameliidae. Klameliidae is most closely related to the gobiconodonts.

== See also ==
- Glossary of mammalian dental topography
