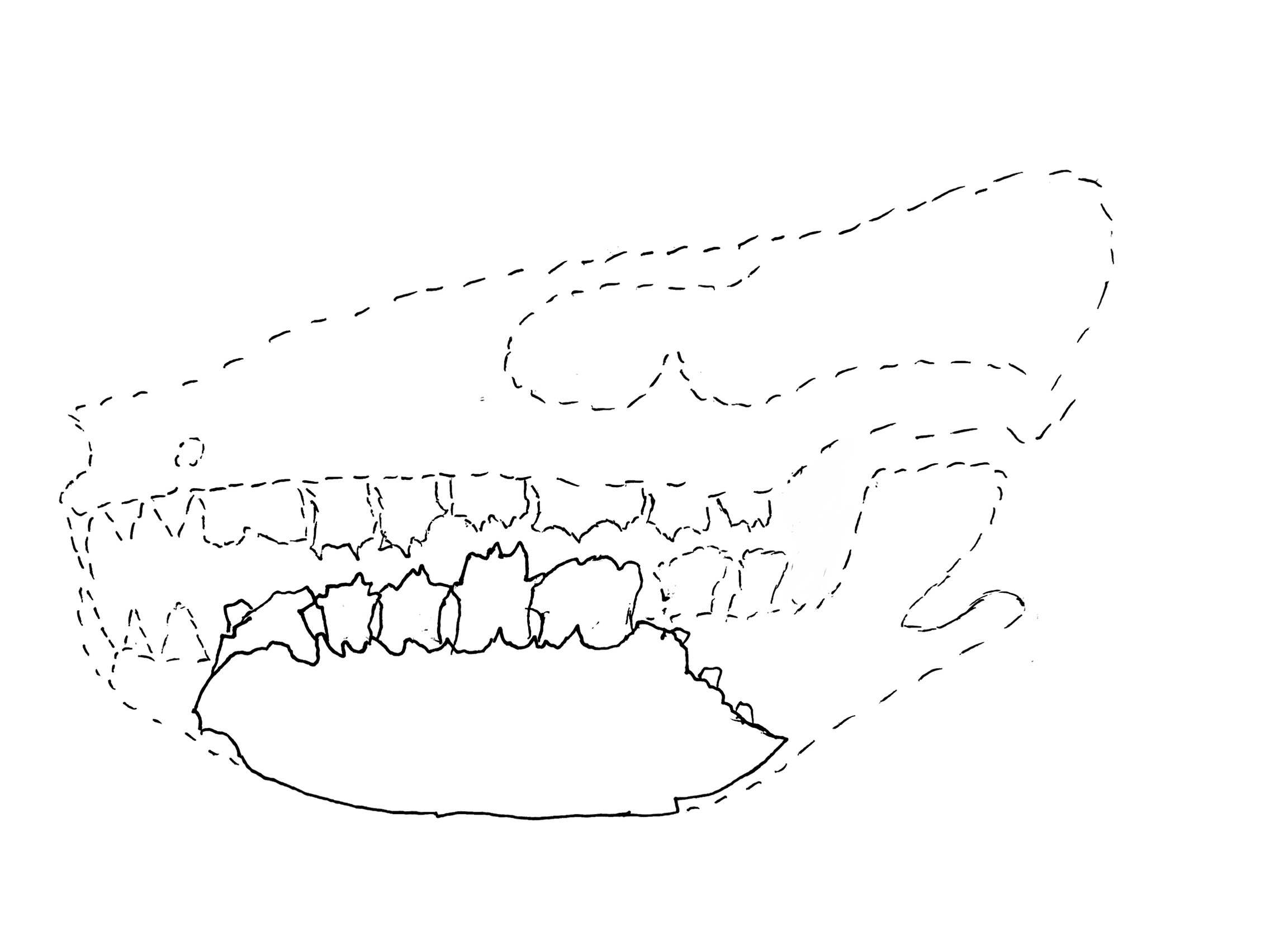
- Klamelia's preserved dentary and speculative skull

Scientific classification
- Domain: Eukaryota
- Kingdom: Animalia
- Phylum: Chordata
- Class: Mammalia
- Order: †Eutriconodonta
- Family: †Klameliidae; Martin & Averianov, 2006

Genera
- Ferganodon Thomas & Averianov, 2006; Klamelia Chow & Rich, 1984

= Klameliidae =

Klameliidae Temporal range: Middle Jurassic

Extinct family of mammals

Klameliidae is a family of extinct mammals from the Jurassic which are closely related to the Gobiconodonts. It contains only two genera: Ferganodon and Klamelia. They are distinguished from Gobiconodonts by parallelogram shaped lower molariforms and other slight differences in dental topography.
