= Tikitherium =

Tikitherium Temporal range: Neogene

Scientific classification
- Kingdom: Animalia
- Phylum: Chordata
- Class: Mammalia
- Order: Eulipotyphla
- Family: Soricidae
- Subfamily: Crocidurinae
- Genus: †Tikitherium; Datta, 2005
- Species: †T. copei

Binomial name
- †Tikitherium copei Datta, 2005

Extinct genus of mammaliaforms

Tikitherium is an extinct genus of mammaliaforms from India, known from a single upper tooth. Originally argued to be a primitive mammaliaform from the Late Triassic, a 2024 study argued that it actually represented the remains of a shrew from the Neogene. Tikitherium refers to Tiki, the village located near the Tiki Formation where the specimen was originally thought to have come from, and therium is Greek for “Beast”. The species was named copei in honor of Edward Drinker Cope for his pioneering discoveries towards understanding mammalian molars.

== History and discovery ==
Tikitherium copei was first described by Datta in 2005. The first and only specimen is an upper tooth that was thought to have discovered in the lower part of the Late Triassic Tiki Formation, located in the South Rewa Gondwana Basin, India. Both the genus Tikitherium and the species copei were named by Datta in 2005. The currently only known specimen was deposited in the Paleontology Division of the Geological Survey of India, Calcutta. Although only a single tooth was found, it showed several derived features that are similar to other early mammalian dentitions, but further detailed comparisons showed the various differences that allowed this tooth to specifically stand out on its own.

=== Classification ===
Tikitherium is considered to be mammal based on Datta (2005). However, the phylogeny based on Luo and Martin (2007) places Tikitherium and Docodonta as sister taxa, which are Mammaliformes, based on the shared traits of wear facets and platform on the lingual side of the molars. Although Luo and Martin conclude that Tikitherium and Docodonta are the most closely related, it is debated that Woutersia instead may be the sister taxa to Docodonta due to the similarity of their prominent lingual cusps.

- Mammaliaformes
  - Morganucodon
  - - Kuehneotherium
    - - Megazostrodon
      - - Delsatia
        - - Woutersia
          - - Tikitherium
            - Docodonta
              - - Tegotherium
                - Sibirotherium
              - - Gondtherium
                - - Castorocauda
                  - - - Itatodon
                      - Krusatodon
                    - - Simpsonodon
                      - - - Tashkumyrodon
                          - Borealestes
                        - - Dsungarodon
                          - - Haldanodon
                            - Docodon

A 2024 study argued that the tooth was actually the upper fourth premolar of a shrew belonging to the subfamily Crocidurinae, and actually dated to the Neogene rather than the Late Triassic as had previously been supposed. The authors suggested that T. copei "likely represents a distinct taxon at least at the species level. However, as the validity of T. copei is not certain, Pal/CHQ-009, the holotype of T. copei, should be currently identified as Crocidurinae gen. et sp. indet."

== Description ==
Tikitherium is only known from a single upper tooth, originally argued to be a left molar but currently thought to be a right fourth premolar. The tooth closely resembles members of the modern shrew subfamily Crocidurinae in having a "short horseshoe-shaped protocone", and the hypocone being absent. The tooth is broadly similar to those of species of Suncus. It differs from modern members of Crocidurinae by "a more massive central cusp (paracone) and a more obtuse angle between the paracone axis and the lingual lobe.", which are likely plesiomorphic features.

== Geological and paleoenvironment ==
Tikitherium was previously thought to have originated from the Tiki Formation, which is well known for its Late Triassic vertebrates. However, it has since been argued that Tikitherium actually was found in reworked sediments derived from erosion of the Tiki Formation that formed much later during the Neogene. A similar issue was previously reported with Tikiguania which was also previously interpreted as coming from the Tiki Formation, and thus the oldest known squamate, but was later interpreted as modern agamid lizard coming from Neogene or Quaternary deposits.
