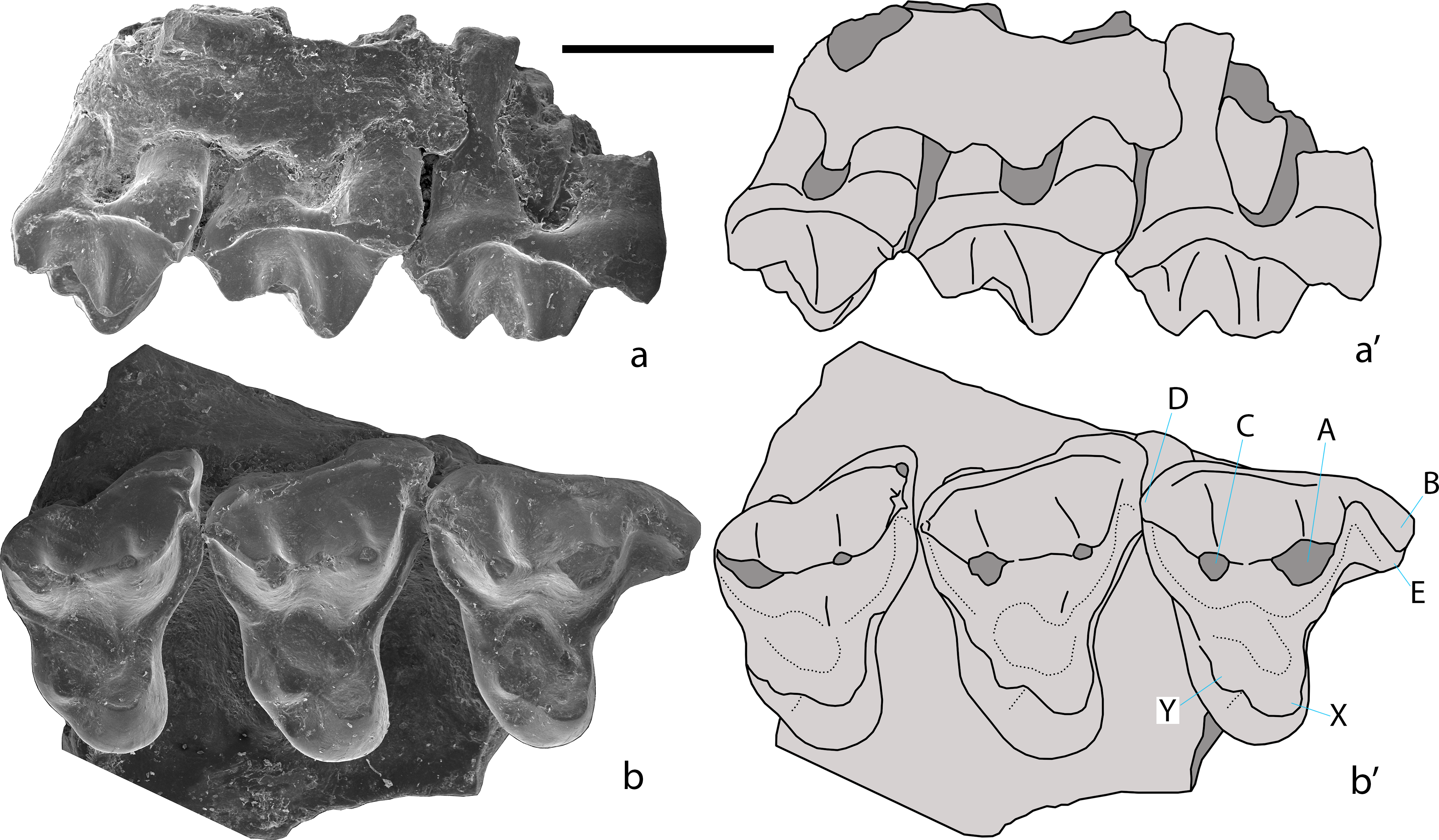
- Maxilla fragment
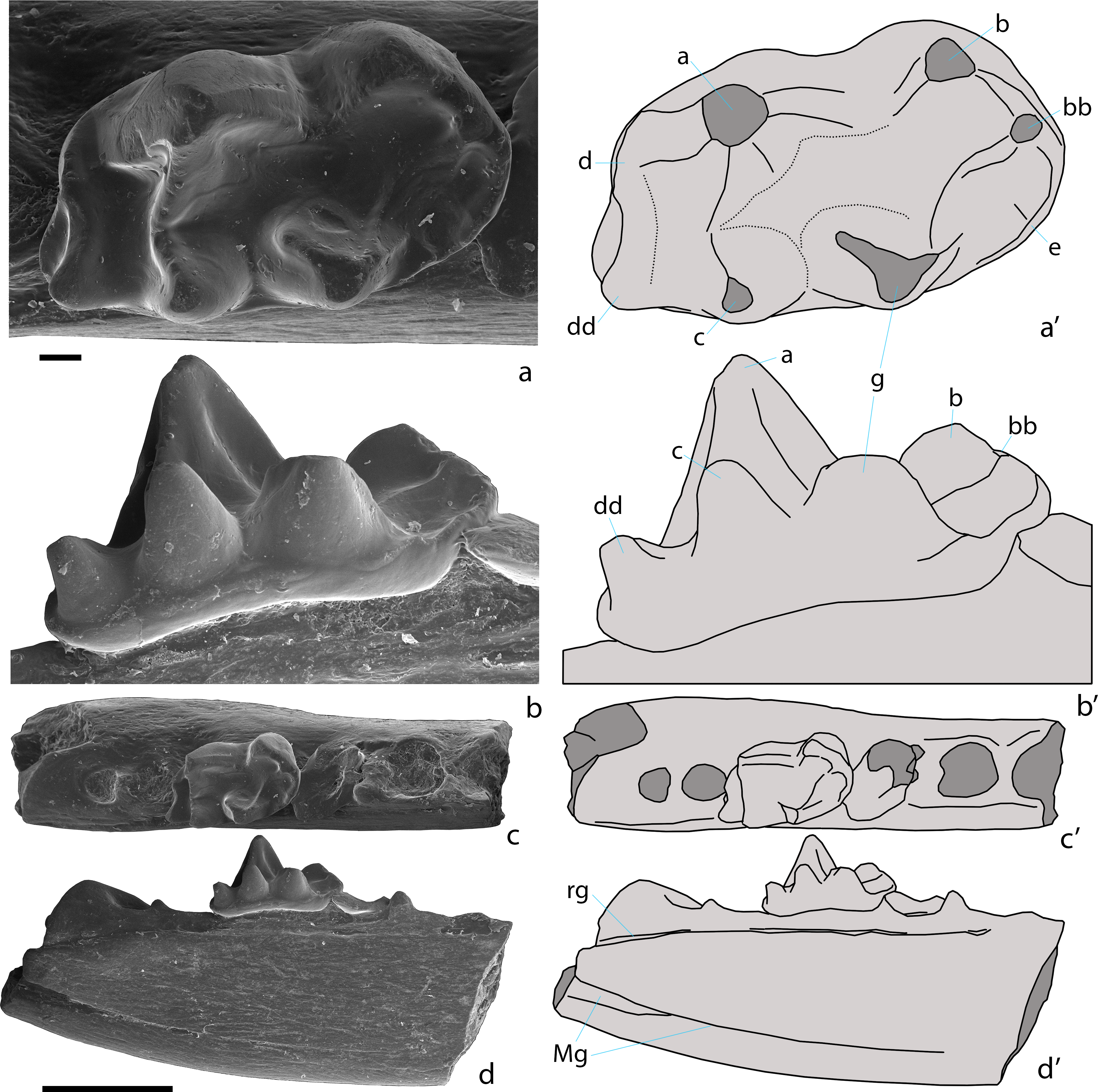
- Dentary fragment

Scientific classification
- Domain: Eukaryota
- Kingdom: Animalia
- Phylum: Chordata
- Clade: Synapsida
- Clade: Therapsida
- Clade: Cynodontia
- Clade: Mammaliaformes
- Order: †Docodonta
- Family: †Tegotheriidae
- Genus: †Khorotherium; Averianov et al., 2018
- Species: †K. yakutensis

Binomial name
- †Khorotherium yakutensis Averianov et al., 2018

= Khorotherium =

Khorotherium Temporal range: Lower Cretaceous

Extinct genus of mammaliaforms

Khorotherium is a genus of extinct mammaliaforms. The type and only species, Khorotherium yakutensis, is known from the Lower Cretaceous Batylykh Formation in Western Yakutia, Russia. It belongs to the family Tegotheriidae from the order Docodonta, alongside Sibirotherium from the same region, it is amongst the youngest known docodonts.

== Phylogeny ==
- - Sinoconodon
  - - Dinnetherium
    - - Morganucodon
      - - Megazostrodon
        - - Woutersia
          - Docodonta
            - Itatodon
            - - Castorocauda
              - Tashkumyrodon
              - Docodontidae
                - Borealestes
                - - Docodon
                  - Haldanodon
              - - Acuodulodon
                - Simpsonodontidae (new family)
                  - Dsugarodon
                  - Simpsonodon
                - Tegotheriidae
                  - Krusatodon
                  - - Hutegotherium
                    - Tegotheriinae
                      - Tegotherium
                      - Sibirotherium
                      - - Khorotherium
