= Hutegotherium =

Hutegotherium Temporal range: Middle Jurassic, 165 Ma

Scientific classification
- Domain: Eukaryota
- Kingdom: Animalia
- Phylum: Chordata
- Clade: Synapsida
- Clade: Therapsida
- Clade: Cynodontia
- Clade: Mammaliaformes
- Order: †Docodonta
- Family: †Tegotheriidae
- Genus: †Hutegotherium; Averianov, Lopatin, Krasnolutskii & Ivantsov, 2010
- Species: †H. yaomingi

Binomial name
- †Hutegotherium yaomingi Averianov, Lopatin, Krasnolutskii & Ivantsov, 2010

Extinct genus of mammaliaforms

Hutegotherium is an extinct genus of tegotheriid docodont known from partial remains found in Middle Jurassic (Bathonian age) Itat Formation of Krasnoyarsk Krai, Russia. It was first named by Averianov, A. A.; Lopatin, A. V.; Krasnolutskii, S. A.; and Ivantsov, S. V. in 2010 and the type species is Hutegotherium yaomingi.

== Phylogeny ==
Cladogram after Averianov et al. (2010).

- - Sinoconodon
  - - Dinnetherium
    - - Morganucodon
      - - Megazostrodon
        - - Woutersia
          - Docodonta
            - Itatodon
            - - Castorocauda
              - Tashkumyrodon
              - Docodontidae
                - Borealestes
                - - Docodon
                  - Haldanodon
              - - Acuodulodon
                - Simpsonodontidae (new family)
                  - Dsungarodon
                  - Simpsonodon
                - Tegotheriidae
                  - Krusatodon
                  - - Hutegotherium
                    - Tegotheriinae
                      - Tegotherium
                      - Sibirotherium
