= Castorocauda =

Castorocauda Temporal range: Middle Jurassic, 164 Ma
- Fossil cast at the Chaoyang Paleontological Museum

Scientific classification
- Kingdom: Animalia
- Phylum: Chordata
- Clade: Synapsida
- Clade: Therapsida
- Clade: Cynodontia
- Clade: Mammaliaformes
- Order: †Docodonta
- Family: †Docodontidae
- Genus: †Castorocauda; Ji et al., 2006

Type species
- †Castorocauda lutrasimilis Ji et al., 2006

Jurassic beaver-like mammal from China

Castorocauda is an extinct, semi-aquatic, superficially otter-like genus of docodont mammaliaforms with one species, C. lutrasimilis. It is part of the Yanliao Biota, found in the Daohugou Beds of Inner Mongolia, China dating to the Middle to Late Jurassic. It was part of a Middle Jurassic explosive radiation of Mammaliaformes moving into diverse habitats and niches. Its discovery in 2006, along with the discovery of other unusual mammaliaforms, disproves the previous hypothesis of Mammaliaformes remaining evolutionarily stagnant until the extinction of the non-avian dinosaurs at the end of the Mesozoic.

Weighing an estimated 500–800 g (1.1–1.8 lb), Castorocauda is the largest known Jurassic mammaliaform. It is the earliest known mammaliaform with aquatic adaptations or a fur pelt. It was also adapted for digging, and its teeth are similar to those of seals and Eocene whales, collectively suggesting it behaved similarly to the modern-day platypus and river otters and ate primarily fish. It lived in a wet, seasonal, cool temperate environment – which possibly had an average temperature not exceeding 15 °C (59 °F) – alongside salamanders, pterosaurs, birdlike dinosaurs, and other mammaliaforms.

== Discovery and etymology ==
The holotype specimen, JZMP04117, was discovered in the Daohugou Beds of the Jiulongshan Formation in the Inner Mongolia region of China, which dates to about 159–164 million years ago (mya) in the Middle to Late Jurassic. It comprises a partial skeleton including an incomplete skull but well-preserved lower jaws, most of the ribs, the limbs (save for the right hind leg), the pelvis and the tail. The remains are so well preserved that there are elements of its soft anatomy and hair.

The genus name Castorocauda derives from Latin Castor "beaver" and cauda "tail", in reference to its presumed beaver-like tail. The species name lutrasimilis derives from Latin lutra "otter" and similis "similar", because some aspects of its teeth and vertebrae are similar to modern otters.

== Description ==
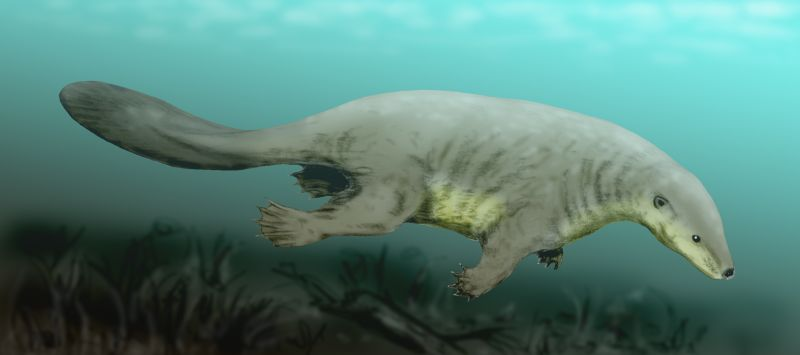
Life restoration

Castorocauda was the largest of known docodonts. The preserved length from head to tail is 425 mm (16.7 in), but in life it was much larger. Based on the dimensions of the platypus, the lower weight limit was estimated to be 518 g (1.1 lb) in life, and the upper 700 to 800 g (1.5 to 1.8 lb), making it the largest known Jurassic mammaliaform, surpassing the previous record of 500 g (1.1 lb) for Sinoconodon.

It had specialized teeth that curve backwards to help it hold onto slippery fish, as seen in modern seals and also ancestral whales. The first two molars have cusps in a straight row, and interlocked during biting. This feature is similar to the ancestral condition in Mammaliaformes (such as in triconodonts) but is a derived character (it was specially evolved instead of inherited) in Castorocauda. The lower jaw contained 4 incisors, 1 canine, 5 premolars and 6 molars.

The forelimbs of Castorocauda are very similar to those of the modern platypus: the humerus widens towards the elbow; the forearm bones have hypertrophied (large) epicondyles (where the joint attaches); the radial and ulnar joints are widely separated; the ulna has a massive olecranon (where it attaches to the elbow); the wrist bones are block-like; and the finger bones are robust. Docodontans were likely burrowing creatures and had a sprawling gait, and Castorocauda may have also used its arms for rowing, similar to the platypus. There are traces of soft tissue between the toes, suggesting webbed hind feet. It likely also had claws, and the holotype shows a spur on the hind ankle, which, in male platypuses, is venomous.

Castorocauda likely had 14 thoracic, 7 lumbar, 3 sacral and 25 tail vertebrae. Like some mammals, it had plated ribs, and the ribs extended into the lumbar vertebrae. Plating occurred on the proximal margins (the part of the rib closest to the vertebra), and, in Castorocauda, they may have served to increase the insertion area (the part of a muscle which moves while contracting) of the iliocostalis muscle on the back, which would interlock nearby ribs and better support the torso of the animal. Plated ribs are present in arboreal (tree-dwelling) and fossorial (burrowing) xenarthrans (sloths, anteaters, armadillos and relatives). The tail vertebrae are flattened dorsoventrally (shortened vertically and widened more horizontally); and each centrum has two pairs of transverse processes (which jut out diagonally from the centrum) on the headward side and another on the tailward side, making the centrum appear somewhat like the letter H from the top-view looking down. This tail anatomy is similar to beavers and otters, which use their tails for paddling and propulsion.

Fur was preserved on the holotype, and it is the earliest known pelt; this showed that fur, with its many uses including heat retention and as a tactile sense, was an ancestral trait of mammals. Mammals preserved with fur from the Chinese Yixian Formation show little hair on the tail, whereas the fur outline preserved on the Castorocauda tail was 50% wider than the pelvis. The first quarter is covered by guard hairs, the middle half by scales and little hair cover and the last quarter by scales with some guard hair. Beavers have a very similar tail. Evidence of fur and assumed heightened tactile senses indicate it had a well-developed neocortex, a portion of the brain unique to mammals which, among other things, controls sensory perception.

== Taxonomy ==
Stem Mammaliaformes

- - Adelobasileus
  - - Sinoconodon
    - - - Morganucodon
        - Megazostrodon
      - - - Haramiyavia
          - - Thomasia
            - - Megaconus
              - - Eleutherodon
                - Sineleutherus
        - - Docodonta
            - - Sibirotherium
              - - Tegotherium
                - Hutegotherium
            - - Itatodon
              - - - Krusatodon
                  - Agilodocodon
                - - Simpsonodon
                  - - - Tashkumyrodon
                      - - Castorocauda
                        - Dsungarodon
                    - - Borealestes
                      - - - Docofossor
                          - Docodon
                        - Haldanodon
          - - Hadrocodium
            - Crown mammals

Castorocauda with other mammaliaforms

Castorocauda is a member of the order Docodonta, an extinct group of mammaliaforms. Mammaliaformes includes mammal-like creatures and the crown mammals (all descendants, living or extinct, of the last common ancestor of all living mammals). Docodonts are not crown mammals. When Castorocauda was first described in 2006, it was thought to be most closely related to the European Krusatodon and Simpsonodon. In a 2010 review of docodonts, Docodonta was split into Docodontidae, Simpsonodontidae and Tegotheriidae, with Castorocauda considered incertae sedis with indeterminate affinities. Simpsonodontidae is now considered to be paraphyletic and thus invalid, and Castorocauda appears to have been most closely related to Dsungarodon, which came from the Junggar Basin of China and probably ate plants and soft invertebrates.

Castorocauda is part of a Middle Jurassic mammaliaform diversification event, wherein mammaliaforms radiated into a wide array of niches and evolved several modern traits, such as more modern mammalian teeth and middle ear bones. It was previously thought that mammals were small and ground-dwelling until the Cretaceous–Paleogene boundary (K–Pg boundary) when dinosaurs went extinct. The discovery of Castorocauda, and evidence for an explosive diversification in the Middle Jurassic – such as the appearance of eutriconodontans, multituberculates, australosphenidans, metatherians and eutherians, among others – disproves this notion. This may have been caused by the breakup of Pangaea, which started in the Early to Middle Jurassic and diversified habitats and niches, or modern traits that had been slowly accumulating since mammaliaforms evolved until reaching a critical point which allowed for a massive expansion into different habitats.

== Paleoecology ==
Castorocauda is the earliest known aquatic mammaliaform, pushing back the first appearance of mammaliaform aquatic adaptations by over 100 million years. The teeth interlocked while biting, suggesting that they were strictly used for gripping; the recurved molars were likely used to hold slippery prey; and the teeth shapes are convergent with seals and Eocene whales, suggesting a similar ecological standing. Based on these, its adaptations to swimming and digging and its large size, Castorocauda was probably comparable to the modern day platypus, river otters and similar semi-aquatic mammals in ecology and fed primarily on fish (piscivory).

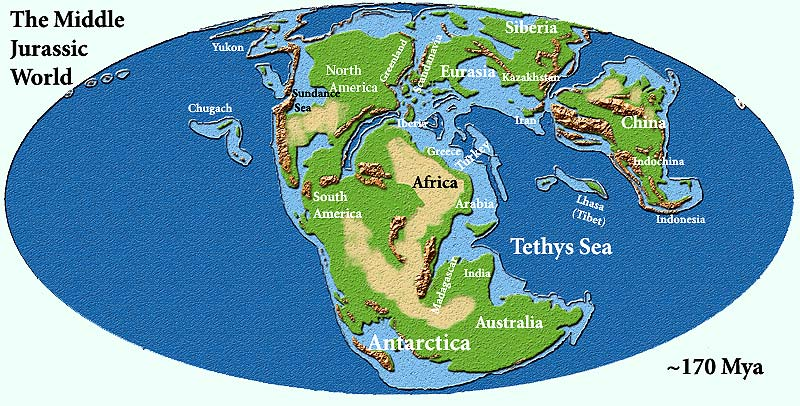
Map of the Middle Jurassic

The Daohugou Beds also include several salamanders, numerous pterosaur species (of which many likely were piscivorous), several insects, the clam shrimp Euestheria and some birdlike dinosaurs. No fish are known from specifically the Daohugou Beds, but the related Linglongta locality contains undetermined ptycholepiformes. Other mammals include the flying-squirrel-like Volaticotherium, the burrowing Pseudotribos, the oldest known eutherian Juramaia. the rat-like Megaconus and the gliding Arboroharamiya. The plant life of the Tiaojishan Formation was dominated by cycadeoids (mainly Nilssonia and Ctenis), leptosporangiate ferns and ginkgophytes and has pollen remains predominantly from pteridophytes and gymnosperms, which indicate a cool temperate and wet climate with distinct wet and dry seasons, possibly with an annual temperature of below 15 °C (59 °F).

== See also ==
- Haldanodon
- Borealestes
