= Microdocodon =

Microdocodon Temporal range: Late Jurassic

Scientific classification
- Domain: Eukaryota
- Kingdom: Animalia
- Phylum: Chordata
- Clade: Synapsida
- Clade: Therapsida
- Clade: Cynodontia
- Clade: Mammaliaformes
- Order: †Docodonta
- Family: †Tegotheriidae
- Genus: †Microdocodon; Zhou et al., 2019
- Species: †M. gracilis

Binomial name
- †Microdocodon gracilis Zhou et al., 2019

Extinct genus of mammaliaforms

Microdocodon is a genus of docodontan mammaliaform from the Late Jurassic Yanliao Biota. It contains only a single species, Microdocodon gracilis, known from the Daohugou locality. It is unique for preserving the hyoid bone, which is almost unknown in the early mammal fossil record.

== Anatomy ==
The species is notable for providing insight into the evolution of the ability to chew and suckle in early relatives of mammals, by preserving a nearly intact hyoid in the throat. This bone is important in mammals because it allows them to suckle, and move their tongue with precision. The complexity of the structure in Microdocodon suggests that chewing and suckle evolved before in the precursors to Mammalia, the mammaliaforms, but after their split with the earlier cynodonts. This supports previous conclusions that an important feature that marks crown mammals (Mammalia) from the mammaliaforms is the evolution of the middle ear, and the way in which it disconnected from its previous position in the mandible.

Microdocodon is an especially small early mammal, thought to have been a shrew-like insectivore weighing about 9 grams. It was probably capable of climbing and living in trees. Microdocodon lived at the same time as semiaquatic Castorocauda, the subterranean mammaliaform Docofossor, and the arboreal Agilodocodon, all known from the Yanliao Biota.

== See also ==
- List of synapsids
