= Peraiocynodon =

Peraiocynodon Temporal range: Middle Jurassic, 174.1–163.5 Ma

Scientific classification
- Kingdom: Animalia
- Phylum: Chordata
- Clade: Synapsida
- Clade: Therapsida
- Clade: Cynodontia
- Clade: Mammaliaformes
- Order: †Docodonta
- Family: †Docodontidae
- Genus: †Peraiocynodon; Simpson, 1928

Type species
- †Peraiocynodon inexpectatus Simpson, 1928

Species
- †P. inexpectatus Simpson, 1928; †P. major Sigogneau-Russell, 2003

Extinct genus of mammaliaforms

Peraiocynodon is an extinct mammaliaform from the order Docodonta, found in the Middle Jurassic rocks of the United Kingdom. It is only known from isolated molar teeth found in the mammal bed at Kirtlington cement quarry in Oxfordshire, England (Forest Marble Formation).

Peraiocynodon was originally erected in 1928 with a single species named, but it was later considered to be a synonym of Docodon. However, in 2003, the genus was resurrected and a new species, P. major, was described based on new teeth found at Kirtington Cement Quarry in Oxfordshire. It remains uncertain whether one or both of these species of Peraiocynodon may be the deciduous teeth of another genus of docodontan, or whether they truly are separate species. In 2004, Alexander Averianov synonymised P. major with Krusatodon kirtlingtonensis.
