= Zhe-Xi Luo =

American palaeontologist

- Education: Nanjing University 1982; University of California at Berkeley 1989; Harvard University 1991
- Scientific career
- Workplaces: University of Chicago current Harvard University

Zhe-Xi Luo (Chinese 骆泽喜; pinyin: Luò Zéxǐ) is an American paleontologist of Chinese origin, specializing in vertebrate paleontology, particularly mammal evolution, morphology, and systematics.

== Background ==
Luo gained his Bachelor's in Geology, Stratigraphy and Paleontology in 1982 from Nanjing University's Department of Geology, before completing his PhD in Paleontology at the University of California at Berkeley, Museum of Paleontology in 1989. He then completed a postdoctoral fellowship in Mammalian Evolutionary Morphology at Harvard University, Museum of Comparative Zoology in 1991. He currently has a lab as Professor of Organismal Biology and Anatomy at the University of Chicago Department of Organismal Biology and Anatomy.

== Research ==
In 1983 Luo met Polish paleontologist Zofia Kielan-Jaworowska, and they co-authored many books and scientific publications. He has since published prolifically and is one of the leading experts in mammal evolution, particularly Mesozoic mammals. He has worked extensively on the origins of mammal ear and jaw anatomy, and has been involved in key research highlighting their unexpected ecological diversity.

Luo is known recently for his work on new mammal specimens from China including Docofossor and Agilodocodon and Microdocodon, and the earliest eutherian mammal, Juramaia. He works in close collaboration with researchers around the world, including at the Beijing Museum of Natural History, and on specimens from around the world, including Haramiyavia.

== Selected publications ==
- Luo ZX, Yuan CX, Meng QJ, Ji Q A. 2011. Jurassic eutherian mammal and divergence of marsupials and placentals. Nature. 2011 Aug 24; 476(7361): 442–5.
- Luo ZX, Ji Q, Yuan CX. 2007. Convergent dental adaptations in pseudo-tribosphenic and tribosphenic mammals. Nature. 450(7166): 93–7.
- Luo ZX, Ji Q, Wible JR, Yuan CX. 2003. An Early Cretaceous tribosphenic mammal and metatherian evolution. Science. 302(5652):1934–40.
- Luo ZX, Crompton AW, Sun AL 2001. A new mammaliaform from the early Jurassic and evolution of mammalian characteristics. Science. 292(5521):1535–40.
