= Balabansai Formation =

Geological formation in Central Asia

- Stratigraphic range: Bathonian-Callovian; ~168–164 Ma
- Type: Geological formation
- Underlies: Hodzhiabad Formation; Cretaceous red beds
- Overlies: Igrysai Svita
- Thickness: Up to 250 m (820 ft)

Lithology
- Primary: Sandstone, siltstone, claystone
- Other: Gravel, marl

Location
- Coordinates: 41.3°N 72.1°E
- Approximate paleocoordinates: 40.9°N 76.2°E
- Region: Ongtustik Qazaqstan oblysy, Jalal-Abad Region
- Country: Kazakhstan, Kyrgyzstan, Uzbekistan
- Balabansai Formation (Kyrgyzstan)

The Balabansai Formation (sometimes transcribed Balabansay, also known as Balabansai Svita) is a geological formation in Kazakhstan, Kyrgyzstan and Uzbekistan whose strata date back to the Bathonian and Callovian stages of the Middle Jurassic. Dinosaur remains are among the fossils that have been recovered from the formation. The lithology primarily consists of variegated sandstones, siltstones, claystones, and rare gravels and marls. Many taxa have been found in the formation, including amphibians and mammals.

== Vertebrate paleofauna ==
Indeterminate Avialae remains located in Ongtustik Qazaqstan Oblysy, Kazakhstan.

=== Fish ===
Fish of the Balabansai Formation
Genus	Species	Presence	Notes
Ferganamia	F. verzilini		A bowfin
Ferganoceratodus	F. jurassicus		A lungfish
Palaeobates	P. verzilini		An elasmobranch
Polyacrodus	P. balabansaiensis, P. prodigialis		A hybodont

=== Amphibians ===
Amphibians of the Balabansai Formation
Genus	Species	Presence	Notes
Ferganobatrachus	F. riabinini		Temnospondyl
Kokartus	K. honorarius		Salamander

=== Turtles ===
Turtles of the Balabansai Formation
Genus	Species	Presence	Notes
Toxocheloides	T. narynensis		
Xinjiangchelys	X. tianshanensis, X. latimarginalis		Xinjiangchelydae

=== Lizards ===
Lizards of the Balabansai Formation
Genus	Species	Presence	Notes
Changetisaurus	C. estesi		Relative of Dorsetisaurus
Lacertilia	Indeterminate		

=== Choristoderes ===
Choristoderes of the Balabansai Formation
Genus	Species	Presence	Notes
Choristodera	Indeterminate		Similar to Cteniogenys

=== Crocodyliformes ===
Crocodyliformes
Genus	Species	Presence	Notes
Sunosuchus	Indeterminate		

=== Dinosaurs ===
Dinosaurs
Genus	Species	Presence	Material	Notes
Praeornis	P. sharovi	Geographically located in Ongtustik Qazaqstan Oblysy, Kazakhstan.		
Alpkarakush	A. kyrgyzicus	Jalal-Abad Oblast, Kyrgyzstan	A partial skeleton including skull bones, partial pectoral and pelvic girdles, dorsal and sacral vertebrae, and most of the hindlimbs	A metriacanthosaurid theropod
Ferganasaurus	F. verzilini	Located within Kyrgyzstan		Basal sauropod
Ferganocephale	F. adenticulatum	Located within Kyrgyzstan		Dubious taxon, Neornithischia indet.
Neosauropoda indet.	Family, genus and species indeterminate	Kyrgyzstan	A heavily worn tooth, the apex of a tooth crown, a left metatarsal I, and a right manual phalanx	
Tetanurae indet.	Family, genus and species indeterminate	Kyrgyzstan	Dozens of teeth	
Stegosauria indet.	Family, genus and species indeterminate	Kyrgyzstan	Four posterior dorsal vertebrae	May be as old as Adratiklit. Remains not diagnostic, given nomen nudum "Ferganastegos" by Roman Ulansky.

=== Pterosaurs ===
Mammals
Genus	Species	Presence	Notes
Rhamphorhynchinae indet.	Genus and species indeterminate	Kyrgyzstan	

=== Mammals ===
Mammals
Genus	Species	Presence	Notes
Ferganodon	F. cf. naryensis		A eutriconodont
Paritatodon	Indeterminate		A docodont or a shuotheriid
Simpsonodon	Indeterminate		A docodont, multiple species present
Tashkumyrodon	T. desideratus		A docodont
Amphilestidae	Indeterminate		
Amphitheriidae	Indeterminate		
Docodonta	Indeterminate		
Paurodontidae	Indeterminate		
Tegotheriidae	Indeterminate		
Tinodontidae	Indeterminate		
Triconodontidae	Indeterminate		

== Invertebrate paleofauna ==
=== Molluscs ===
Genus	Species	Presence	Notes
Proparreysia	"P. thashkumyrica"		A bivalve
Sulcatapex	"S. chatkalica"		A bivalve
Yeniella	"Y. asiatica", "Y. sculpturata"		A bivalve

== Flora ==
=== Conifers ===
Genus	Species	Presence	Notes
Podozamites	P. lanceolatus		

=== Ferns ===
Genus	Species	Presence	Notes
Cladophlebis	C. whitbiensis		
Coniopteris	C. furssenkoi, C. hymenophylloides		

== See also ==
- List of dinosaur-bearing rock formations
