= Cyrtlatherium =

Cyrtlatherium Temporal range: Middle Jurassic, 174.1–163.5 Ma

Scientific classification
- Domain: Eukaryota
- Kingdom: Animalia
- Phylum: Chordata
- Clade: Synapsida
- Clade: Therapsida
- Clade: Cynodontia
- Clade: Mammaliaformes
- Order: †Docodonta
- Family: †Docodontidae
- Genus: †Cyrtlatherium; Freeman, 1979
- Species: †C. canei

Binomial name
- †Cyrtlatherium canei Freeman, 1979

Extinct genus of mammaliaforms

Cyrtlatherium is a dubious genus of extinct docodontan mammaliaform from the Middle Jurassic rocks of Oxfordshire, England. As it is only known from a few isolated molar teeth, there is disagreement about whether Cyrtlatherium is a separate genus, or whether it is a synonym and the molar teeth are the deciduous teeth of another genus of docodont.

Cyrtlatherium was named from a few single molar teeth found in the Kirtlington mammal beds in England, which were originally thought to belong to a kuehneotheriid, but were later reclassified as belonging to a docodont. When reclassifying it, Sigogneau-Russell argued that it was the milk tooth of a previously named docodont called Simpsonodon. This is now generally accepted to be the case by most mammal palaeontologists.
