= Itat Formation =

Geological formation in western Siberia, Russia

- Stratigraphic range: Bajocian-Bathonian; ~170–166 Ma
- Type: Geological formation
- Sub-units: Lower, Middle and Upper members
- Underlies: Tyazhin Formation
- Overlies: Ilan Formation
- Thickness: Several hundred metres

Lithology
- Primary: Sandstone, mudstone, coal
- Other: Siltstone

Location
- Coordinates: 55.7°N 89.2°E
- Approximate paleocoordinates: 58.2°N 86.7°E
- Region: Siberia
- Country: Russia
- Extent: Krasnoyarsk krai, Nazarovo depression, SE West Siberian basin

Type section
- Named for: Itatsky
- Itat Formation (Russia) Itat Formation (Krasnoyarsk Krai)

The Itat Formation (Russian: итатская свита) is a geologic formation in western Siberia. It was deposited in the Bajocian to Bathonian ages of the Middle Jurassic. Dinosaur remains are among the fossils that have been recovered from the formation, including the proceratosaurid Kileskus, as well as fish, amphibians, mammals and many other vertebrates. The formation is noted for bearing significant coal reserves, with large open pit coal mines extracting lignite from the unit currently in operation.

== Lithology ==
The lower section of the formation is around 50–130 m thick, and consists of light grey sandstones with gravel, siltstone and rare coal beds. At the Dubinino locality, the 50 m exposed section of the upper part of the formation shows an irregular rhythmic alteration of fine grained sandstone, siltstone and mudstone and coal seams typically a few tens of cm's but up to several meters thick. The deposit is located on the South Eastern margin of the West Siberian basin

== Locality ==
Most of the fossils were found in the overburden of Berezovsk coal mine^{[ru]}, which is located in southern Krasnoyarsk Krai (Sharypovsky District) near the border with Kemerovo Oblast. The deposit is stratigraphically located in the upper member of the formation. The fossiliferous level of the locality is located above thick (> 50 m) coal seams and consists of unconsolidated silt and sand, which were deposited on an alluvial plain. Due to the fluvial origin of the sediment the remains are disarticulated and often are water worn, though they are mostly well preserved, which suggests they had not been significantly transported. The fossils were largely obtained by screenwashing of the debris. 10-15 tons of material have been processed so far.

== Paleobiota ==
Taken from unless otherwise noted.

=== Fish ===
Fish of the Itat Formation
Genus	Species	Location	Stratigraphic position	Abundance	Notes	Images
Hybodus	Indeterminate	Berezovsk coal mine	Upper Member	Partial tooth		
Acipenseriformes	Indeterminate	Berezovsk coal mine	Upper Member	Scales		
Amiiformes	Indeterminate	Berezovsk coal mine	Upper Member	"Abundant vertebrae, jaws and vomer fragments, as well as isolated teeth, and numerous isolated rhomboidal scales"		
Dipnoi	Indeterminate	Berezovsk coal mine	Upper Member	One complete upper tooth plate, several tooth plate fragments		
Palaeonisciformes	Undescribed	Berezovsk coal mine	Upper Member	Many partial skeletons	Similar to Palaeoniscinotus and Pteroniscus	

=== Amphibians ===
Amphibians of the Itat Formation
Genus	Species	Location	Stratigraphic position	Abundance	Notes	Images
?Eodiscoglossus	Indeterminate	Berezovsk coal mine	Upper Member	Atlantal centrum		Frog
Kiyatriton	K. krasnolutskii	Berezovsk coal mine	Upper Member	Dentary, atlantes, trunk vertebrae and fragmentary cranial and postcranial bones	Formerly known as "Berezovsk salamander B"; genus also known from Early Cretaceous Ilek Formation.	Crown group Salamander
Urupia	U. monstrosa	Berezovsk coal mine	Upper Member	Dentary, femur, an incomplete atlas, an anterior fragment of the left dentary, and fragments of trunk vertebrae	Estimated length of 480-560 centimetres	Stem-Salamander
Egoria	E. malashichevi	Berezovsk coal mine	Upper Member	Atlantal centra, trunk vertebrae	Formerly known as "Berezovsk salamander A" Possibly neotenic	Stem-Salamander

=== Turtles ===
Turtles of the Itat Formation
Genus	Species	Location	Stratigraphic position	Abundance	Notes	Images
Annemys	A. variabilis	Berezovsk coal mine	Upper Member	Thousands of isolated bones and several fragmented specimens, including three partial braincases and larger fragments of connected shell parts	Xinjiangchelyid	
Testudines	Indeterminate	Berezovsk coal mine	Upper Member		Likely one or two taxa distinct from Annemys.	

=== Lepidosauromorphs ===
Lepidosauromorphs of the Itat Formation
Genus	Species	Location	Stratigraphic position	Abundance	Notes	Images
Lepidosauromorpha	Indeterminate	Berezovsk coal mine	Upper Member	Several fragments of dentaries and maxillae	Basal form similar to Marmoretta	
Scincomorpha	Indeterminate	Berezovsk coal mine	Upper Member	Fused premaxillae and two dentary fragments additionally several fragmentary maxillae and dentaries	Two distinct taxa, one of which is two times smaller than the other.	

=== Choristoderes ===
Choristoderes of the Itat Formation
Genus	Species	Location	Stratigraphic position	Abundance	Notes	Images
Cteniogenys	Indeterminate	Berezovsk coal mine	Upper Member	Skull roof bones, maxillary and dentary fragments, vertebrae, ribs		

=== Pterosaurs ===
Pterosaurs of the Itat Formation
Genus	Species	Location	Stratigraphic position	Abundance	Notes	Images
?Rhamphorhynchidae	Indeterminate	Berezovsk coal mine	Upper Member	Numerous isolated teeth and very rare bone fragments		

=== Crocodyliforms ===
Crocodyliforms of the Itat Formation
Genus	Species	Location	Stratigraphic position	Abundance	Notes	Images
Goniopholididae	Indeterminate	Berezovsk coal mine	Upper Member	Several dozens of isolated teeth, osteoderms, and a few cranial fragments		

=== Dinosaurs ===
Dinosaurs of the Itat Formation
Genus	Species	Location	Stratigraphic position	Abundance	Notes	Images
Kileskus	K. aristotocus	Berezovsk coal mine	Upper Member	Holotype description: "premaxilla, maxilla, a mandible fragment, and several limb bone parts"; referred material includes cervical and caudal vertebrae and numerous isolated teeth, as well as a fibula	Proceratosaurid	
Heterodontosauridae	Indeterminate	Berezovsk coal mine	Upper Member	Isolated maxillary and dentary teeth		
Mamenchisauridae	Indeterminate	Berezovsk coal mine	Upper Member	Numerous isolated teeth and two platycoelous posterior caudal vertebrae	Sauropod	
Stegosauria	Indeterminate	Berezovsk coal mine	Upper Member	Fragmentary skeletons of at least two individuals		

=== Mammaliamorphs ===
Mammaliamorphs of the Itat Formation
Genus	Species	Location	Stratigraphic position	Abundance	Notes	Images
Amphibetulimus	A. krasnolutskii	Berezovsk coal mine	Upper Member	Dentary fragments, canine and upper molar	Alternately considered an amphitheriid or a cladotherian	
Amphitherium	Indeterminate	Berezovsk coal mine	Upper Member	Upper and lower molars and an edentulous dentary fragment	An amphitheriid	
Anthracolestes	A. sergeii	Berezovsk coal mine	Upper Member	Isolated teeth and edentulous dentary fragments	A dryolestid	
Hutegotherium	H. yaomingi	Berezovsk coal mine	Upper Member		A docodont	
Itatodon	I. tatarinovi	Berezovsk coal mine	Upper Member		Either a docodont or a member of the family Shuotheriidae	
Maiopatagium	M. sibiricum	Berezovsk coal mine	Upper Member		A euharamiyidan	
Sharypovoia	S. arimasporum, S. magna	Berezovsk coal mine	Upper Member		A euharamiyidan	
Simpsonodon	S. sibiricus	Berezovsk coal mine	Upper Member		A docodont	
"Sineleutherus"	"S." issedonicus	Berezovsk coal mine	Upper Member		A haramiyidan, now believed to represent a number of different euharamiyidan taxa.	
Stereognathus	Indeterminate	Berezovsk coal mine	Upper Member	Upper and lower postcanine teeth	A tritylodontid	
Tagaria	T. antiqua	Berezovsk coal mine	Upper Member	Isolated premolar and two molars	A multituberculate	
Tashtykia	T. primaeva	Berezovsk coal mine	Upper Member	Isolated premolars and incisors	A multituberculate	
Eutriconodonta	Indeterminate	Berezovsk coal mine	Upper Member	One large tooth and several tooth fragments	A large tooth similar to those of Gobiconodon	
Multituberculata	Indeterminate	Berezovsk coal mine	Upper Member	Molariforms		

=== Insects ===
Numerous insect species are known from the Kubekovo village locality located within the upper member of the formation.

Insects of the Itat Formation
Genus	Species	Location	Stratigraphic position	Abundance	Notes	Images
Epiosmylus	Epiosmylus longus				Osmylid lacewing	
Mesosmylina	Mesosmylina sibirica				Osmylid lacewing	
Kubekius	Kubekius multiramosus				Osmylid lacewing	
Thaumatomerobius	Thaumatomerobius mirabilis				Saucrosmylid lacewing	
Archizelmira	Archizelmira jarzembowskii				Archizelmirid fly	
Protanyderus	P. invalidus				Tanyderidae fly	
Boreomerope	B. antiqua				Meropeidae scorpionfly	
Itaphlebia	Itaphlebia completa, Itaphlebia jeniseica, Itaphlebia multa, Itaphlebia reducta				Nannochoristid scorpionfly	
Eublattula	E. curvinervis				A cockroach	
Mesobittacus	M. kubekovensis				hangingfly	
Eoptychoptera	E. maxima, E. modica, E. paramaculata				Ptychopteridae fly	
Eoptychopterina	E. glabra				Ptychopteridae fly	
Proptychopterina	Proptychopterina amota, Proptychopterina handlirschi, Proptychopterina yeniseica				Ptychopteridae fly	
Crenoptychoptera	Crenoptychoptera antica, Crenoptychoptera defossa				Ptychopteridae fly	
Palaeoperissomma	P. collessi				Perissommatidae fly	
Prohyperoscelis	Prohyperoscelis jurassicus				Canthyloscelidae fly	
Microdiplatys	Microdiplatys perfectus				Protodiplatyidae earwig	
Cicadocoris	Cicadocoris admotus, Cicadocoris frater				Progonocimicidae bug	
Olgamartynovia	Olgamartynovia nana				Progonocimicidae bug	
Locustopsis	Locustopsis picta				Locustopsidae orthopteran	
Tinaphis	Tinaphis sibirica				Szelegiewicziidae aphid	
Tarantogus	Tarantogus obscurus, Tarantogus opiparus, Tarantogus sibiricus				Mesopsychidae scorpionfly	
Blattula	Blattula aberrans, Blattula sibirica				Blattulid cockroach	
Kemobius	Kemobius lux				Archijassid leafhopper	
Kisa	Kisa fasciata				Archijassid leafhopper	
Kubecola	Kubecola guttatus				Archijassid leafhopper	
Necrotaulius	Necrotaulius kubekovi				Necrotauliidae caddisfly	
Orthophlebia	Orthophlebia obunca				Orthophlebiidae scorpionfly	

== Flora ==
Flora of the Itat Formation
Genus	Species	Location	Stratigraphic position	Abundance	Notes	Images
Lycopodites	Indeterminate				Club moss	
Equisetites	E. asiaticus, E. cf. lateralis				Stem-horsetail	
Coniopteris	C. hymenophylloides, C. simplex, C. cf. maakiana				Fern	
Cladophlebis	C. denticulata				Fern	
Gonatosorus	G. cf mrassiensis				Fern	
Todites	T. cf. princeps				Fern	
Lobifolia	Indeterminate				Fern	
Rhizomopteris	Indeterminate				Fern	
Ginkgo	Indeterminate, G. ex gr. insolita				Genus extant	
Podozamites	Indeterminate				Conifer	
Sphenobaiera	Indeterminate				Ginkgoales	
Stenorachis	S. cf. scanicus				Gymnosperm	
Czekanowskia	Indeterminate				Czekanowskiales	

== See also ==
- List of dinosaur-bearing rock formations
