= Paritatodon =

Paritatodon Temporal range: Bathonian-Callovian ~165–162 Ma

Scientific classification
- Domain: Eukaryota
- Kingdom: Animalia
- Phylum: Chordata
- Clade: Synapsida
- Clade: Therapsida
- Clade: Cynodontia
- Clade: Mammaliaformes
- Genus: †Paritatodon; Martin & Averianov, 2010
- Species: †P. kermacki

Binomial name
- †Paritatodon kermacki (Sigogneau-Russell, 1998)

Extinct genus of mammaliaforms

Paritatodon is an extinct mammaliaform which existed in Kyrgyzstan and England during the Jurassic period. It was originally the holotype specimen of Shuotherium kermacki, but Martin and Averianov (2010) argued that it resembled the genus Itatodon (Docodonta) and so renamed it Paritatodon.

Nonetheless, some recent phylogenetic studies assign it (and Itatodon) to Shuotheriidae, while others continue to consider the taxon a docodont.

Like many Mesozoic mammals, this species is only known from its teeth, in this case two lower molars from the Forest Marble Formation in England, and a single left lower molar from the Balabansai Formation in the Fergana Depression, Kyrgyzstan.
