= Dobunnodon =

Dobunnodon Temporal range: Middle Jurassic, 168–166 Ma

Scientific classification
- Kingdom: Animalia
- Phylum: Chordata
- Clade: Synapsida
- Clade: Therapsida
- Clade: Cynodontia
- Clade: Mammaliaformes
- Order: †Docodonta
- Family: †Docodontidae
- Genus: †Dobunnodon; Panciroli et al., 2021
- Species: †D. mussettae

Binomial name
- †Dobunnodon mussettae Panciroli et al., 2021

Synonyms
- Borealestes mussettae (Averianov, 2004); Borealestes mussetti Sigogneau-Russell, 2003

Extinct genus of mammaliaforms

Dobunnodon its an extinct genus of docodont from the Middle Jurassic (Bathonian) Forest Marble Formation of England, first discovered in Oxfordshire near the village of Kirtlington. The type species, D. mussettae, was originally named as a species of Borealestes in 2003.

== History ==
In 2003, Borealestes mussettae (originally 'B. mussetti') was named by Denise Sigogneau-Russell, based on isolated molars found in the Bathonian aged Kirtlington Mammal bed of Oxfordshire, England. It differs from B. serendipitus in the details of cusps and ridges on the molar teeth. The species name mussetti was in honour of Dr Frances Mussett, in recognition of her major participation in fossil excavation at Kirtlington Cement Quarry. However, mussetti is the masculine form, and so this has been amended to mussettae by subsequent authors, starting with Alexander Averianov in 2004. It was moved to the new genus Dobunnodon in 2021.

== Appearance ==
Dobunnodon is currently only known from isolated molars. Docodonts are small (shrew to rat sized) mammaliaforms. Dobunnodon is believed to be a basal member of Docodonta.
