= Nujalikodon =

Nujalikodon Temporal range: Rhaetian-Sinemurian ~200 Ma

Scientific classification
- Kingdom: Animalia
- Phylum: Chordata
- Clade: Synapsida
- Clade: Therapsida
- Clade: Cynodontia
- Clade: Mammaliaformes
- Order: †Docodonta
- Genus: †Nujalikodon

Type species
- †Nujalikodon cassiopeiae Patrocinio et al., 2025

Extinct genus of mammaliaforms

Nujalikodon is a genus of mammaliaform from the Rhætelv Formation of central East Greenland. It dates to the Late Triassic, making it the oldest definitive docodontan. It is known from a fragment of jaw with a single preserved molar tooth.

== Etymology ==
Nujalikodon is named after Nujalik, the goddess of hunting on land in Inuit mythology, and the suffix '-odon' meaning tooth. The name for the type species N. cassiopeiae, comes from the cusp pattern in the tooth, which resembles the arrangement of the stars in the constellation Cassiopeia.
