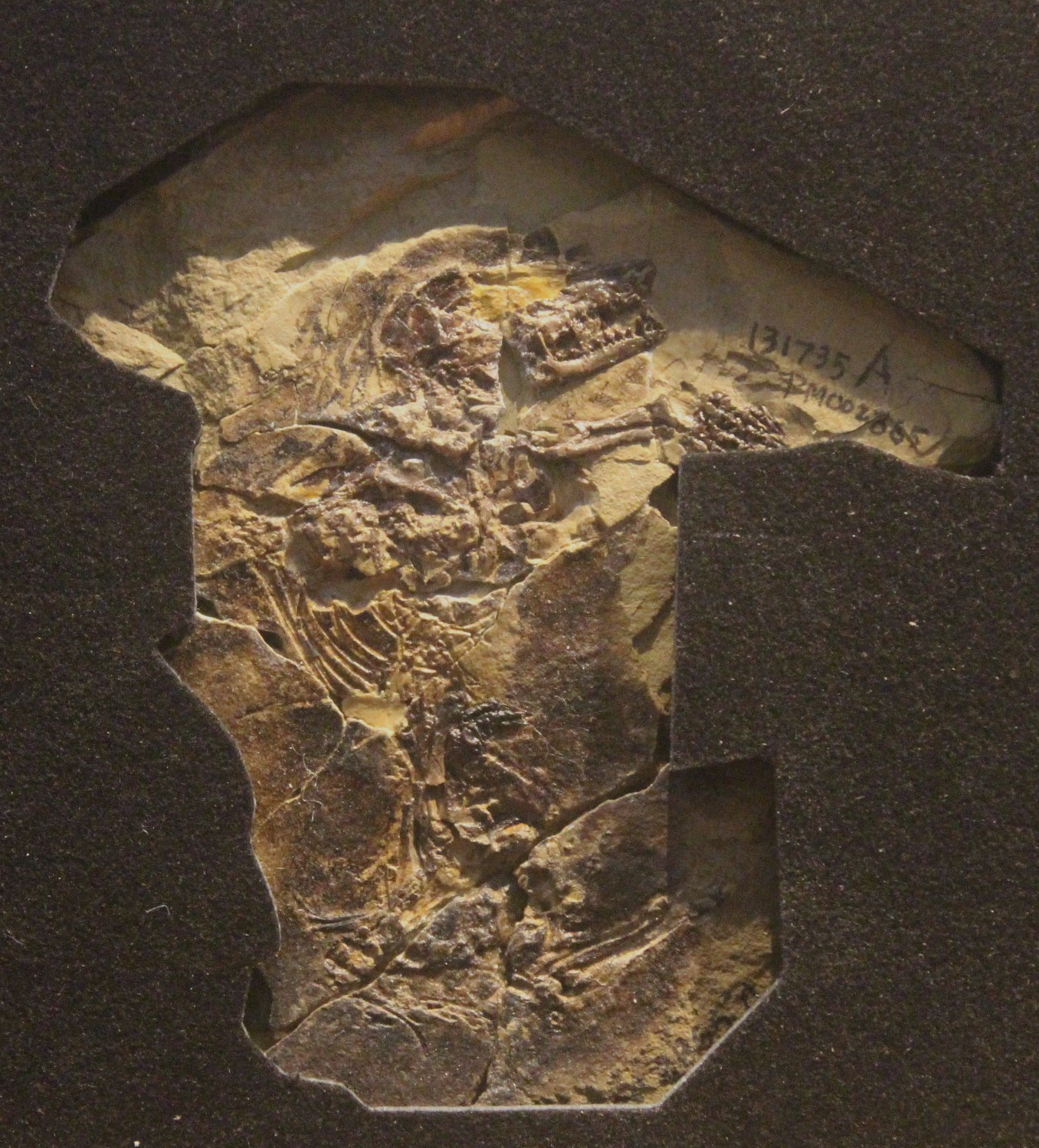
- Holotype specimen (BMNH 131735) of D. brachydactylus, National Natural History Museum of China

Scientific classification
- Domain: Eukaryota
- Kingdom: Animalia
- Phylum: Chordata
- Clade: Synapsida
- Clade: Therapsida
- Clade: Cynodontia
- Clade: Mammaliaformes
- Order: †Docodonta
- Family: †Docodontidae
- Genus: †Docofossor; Luo et al., 2015
- Species: †D. brachydactylus

Binomial name
- †Docofossor brachydactylus Luo et al., 2015

= Docofossor =

Docofossor Temporal range: Middle Jurassic

Extinct genus of mammaliaforms

Docofossor is an extinct mammaliaform (a docodont) from the Jurassic period. Its remains have been recovered in China from 160-million-year-old rocks. It appears to have been the earliest-known subterranean mammaliaform, with adaptations remarkably similar to the modern Chrysochloridae, the golden moles.

== Discovery ==
Life restoration of D. brachydactylus

The fossil of Docofossor brachydactylus, holotype BMNH 131735, along with that of Agilodocodon scansorius, was originally found by farmers near Nanshimen in the province of Hebei in a layer of the Chinese Tiaojishan Formation (Oxfordian) and acquired by the Beijing Museum of Natural History. The holotype consists of a compressed skeleton with skull and lower jaws, preserved on a plate and counterplate, along with soft-tissue remnants. The shoulder girdle area and the tail have been damaged. The type species Docofossor brachydactylus was named and described by Zhe-Xi Luo, Meng Qingjin, Ji Qiang, Liu Di, Zhang Yuguang, and April I. Neander in the journal Science in 2015. The generic name refers to the membership of the Docodonta and a burrowing lifestyle, fossor meaning "digger" in Latin. The specific name is derived from Greek βραχύς, "short", and δάκτυλος, "finger", referring to the reduction of the finger phalanges.

== Skeleton ==
Docofossor was at least nine centimetres long, exempting the tail, and weighed at least nine grams, perhaps sixteen. It had a skeletal structure and body proportions strikingly similar to the modern day African golden mole. It had shovel-like fingers for digging, short and wide upper molars typical of mammals that forage underground, and a sprawling posture indicative of subterranean movement. The sprawling is proven by a short hindlimb of just twenty-three millimetres, a massive olecranon as an adaptation for digging and a projecting parafibula forcing the knee joint into a bent position. Its snout point was blunt and slightly overhanging.

== Characteristics ==
Docofossor shows two unique derived traits or autapomorphies. The upper molars have a grooved (prestylar) shelf at the front. The fourth molar has a single root.

Docofossor had a reduced number of phalanges in its fingers. The phalangeal formula was 2-2-2-2-2 instead of the ancestral 2-3-3-3-3. This led to shortened but wide digits. Furthermore, the claw-bearing sections were enlarged and the upper phalanges shortened. African golden moles possess almost exactly the same adaptation, which provides an evolutionary advantage for digging mammals. This characteristic is due to the fusion of the bone joints between the upper and middle phalanges during embryonic development—a process influenced by the genes BMP and GDF-5. Because of the many anatomical similarities, the researchers hypothesize that this genetic mechanism may have played a comparable role in early mammaliaform evolution, as in the case of Docofossor.

The spines and ribs of Docofossor also show evidence for the influence of genes seen in modern mammals, since they feature a gradual thoracic to lumbular vertebrae transition. These shifting patterns of thoracic-lumbular transition have been seen in modern mammals and are known to be regulated by the genes Hox 9-10 and Myf 5-6. That these ancient mammaliaforms had similar developmental patterns is evidence that these gene networks could have functioned in a similar way long before true mammals evolved.

== Phylogeny ==
Docofossor was placed in the Docodontidae together with Docodon and Haldanodon. Docodontidae are basal Mammaliaformes outside of the crown group Mammalia.

== Paleobiology ==
Early mammaliaforms were once thought to have limited ecological opportunities to diversify during the dinosaur-dominated Mesozoic era. However, Docofossor and numerous other fossils—including Castorocauda, a (related) swimming, fish-eating mammaliaform—provide strong evidence that forms ancestral to the true mammals adapted to wide-ranging environments despite competition from dinosaurs.
