= Feredocodon =

Feredocodon Temporal range: 168–164 Ma Middle Jurassic

Scientific classification
- Kingdom: Animalia
- Phylum: Chordata
- Clade: Synapsida
- Clade: Therapsida
- Clade: Cynodontia
- Clade: Mammaliaformes
- Family: †Shuotheriidae
- Genus: †Feredocodon; Mao et al., 2024

Type species
- Feredocodon chowi Mao et al., 2024

Extinct genus of mammals

Feredocodon is an extinct genus of mammaliaform that lived during the Middle Jurassic between 168 and 164 million years ago. It was discovered in China, Inner Mongolia, in Daohugou locality.
