= Urupia =

Urupia Temporal range: Bathonian

Scientific classification
- Kingdom: Animalia
- Phylum: Chordata
- Class: Amphibia
- Order: Urodela
- Genus: †Urupia; Skutschas & Krasnolutskii, 2011

Type species
- †Urupia monstrosa Skutschas & Krasnolutskii, 2011

Extinct genus of salamanders

Urupia is an extinct genus of salamander in what is now Russia from the Bathonian aged Itat Formation. It was described by P. P. Skutschas and S. A. Krasnolutskii in 2011, and the type species is U. monstrosa.
