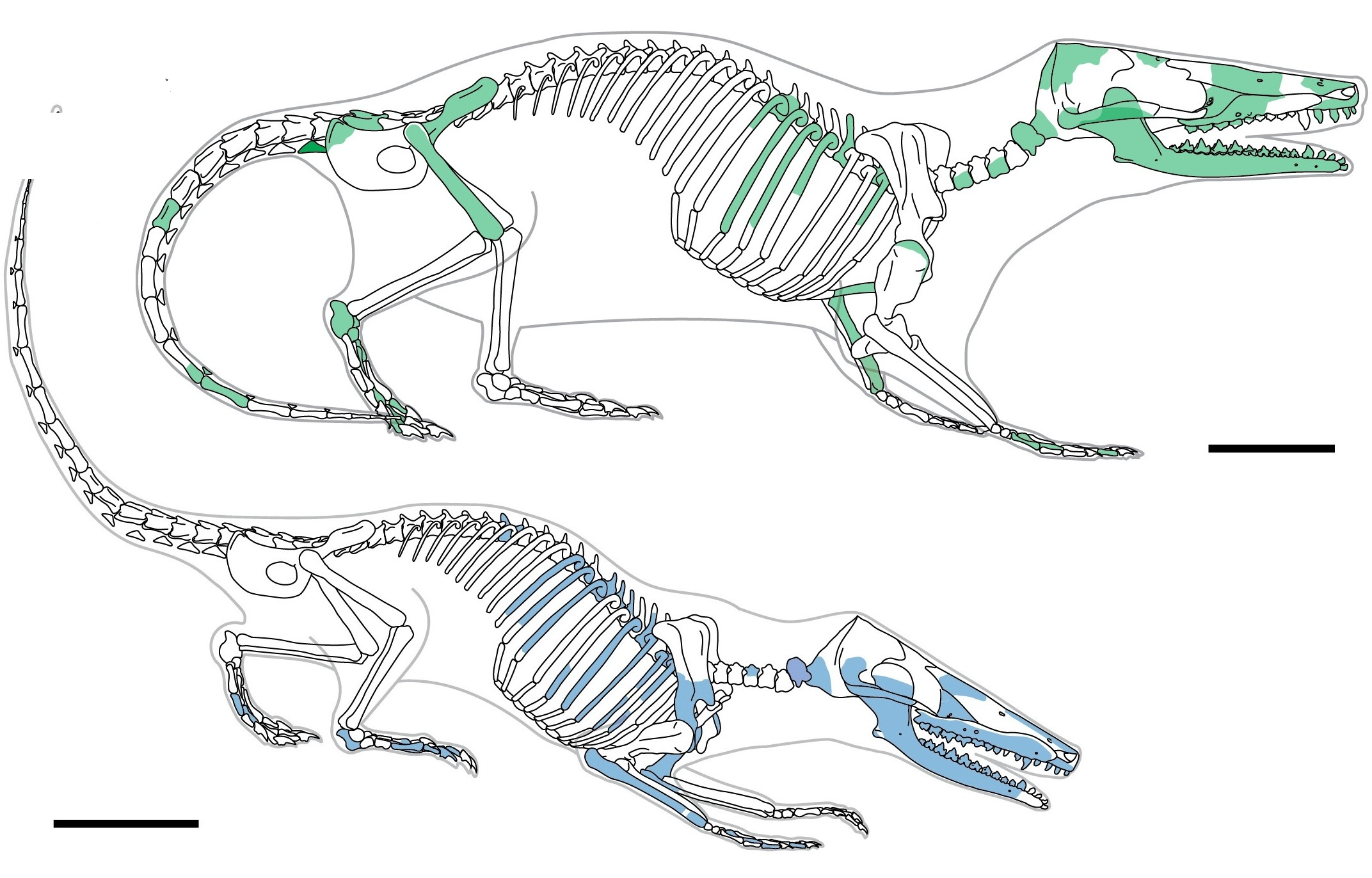
- Skeletal diagrams of Borealestes serendipitus (green) and B. cuillinensis (blue) from the Middle Jurassic of Scotland. Scale bars = 10 mm

Scientific classification
- Kingdom: Animalia
- Phylum: Chordata
- Clade: Synapsida
- Clade: Therapsida
- Clade: Cynodontia
- Clade: Mammaliaformes
- Order: †Docodonta; Kretzoi, 1946

Genera
- See text.

= Docodonta =

Docodontans Temporal range: Early Jurassic–Early Cretaceous, Hettangian–Aptian

Extinct order of mammaliaforms

Docodonta is an order of extinct Mesozoic mammaliaforms (advanced cynodonts closely related to true crown-group mammals). They were among the most common mammaliaforms of their time, persisting from the Early Jurassic to the Early Cretaceous across the continent of Laurasia (modern-day North America, Europe, and Asia). They are distinguished from other early mammaliaforms by their relatively complex molar teeth.

Docodontan teeth have been described as "pseudotribosphenic": a cusp on the inner half of the upper molar grinds into a basin on the front half of the lower molar, like a mortar-and-pestle. This is a case of convergent evolution with the tribosphenic teeth of therian mammals. There is much uncertainty for how docodontan teeth developed from their simpler ancestors. Their closest relatives may have been certain Triassic "symmetrodonts", namely Woutersia, and Delsatia. The shuotheriids, another group of Jurassic mammaliaforms, also shared some dental characteristics with docodontans. One study has suggested that shuotheriids are closely related to docodontans, though others consider shuotheriids to be true mammals, perhaps related to monotremes.

For much of their history of study, docodontan fossils were represented by isolated teeth and jaws. The first docodontan known from decent remains was Haldanodon, from the Late Jurassic Guimarota site of Portugal. Recently, exceptionally preserved skeletons have been discovered in the Jurassic Tiaojishan Formation of China. Chinese docodontans include otter-like, mole-like, and squirrel-like species, hinting at impressive ecological diversity within the group. Many docodontans have muscular limbs and broad tail vertebrae, adaptations for burrowing or swimming. Like true mammals, docodontans have hair, a saddle-shaped hyoid apparatus, and reduced postdentary jaw bones which are beginning to develop into middle ear ossicles. On the other hand, the postdentary bones are still attached to the jaw and skull, the nares (bony nostril rims) have yet to fuse, and in most species the spine's thoracic-lumbar transition is rather subdued.

== Description ==
=== Skeletal traits ===
==== Jaw and ear ====
Docodontans have a long and low mandible (lower jaw), formed primarily by the tooth-bearing dentary bone. The dentary connects to the cranium via a joint with the squamosal, a connection which is strengthened relative to earlier mammaliaforms.

The other bones in the jaw, known as postdentary elements, are still connected to the dentary and lie within a groove (the postdentary trough) in the rear part of the dentary's inner edge. Nevertheless, they are very slender, hosting hooked prongs which start to converge towards an oval-shaped area immediately behind the dentary. The ectotympanic bone, also known as the angular, fits into a deep slot on the dentary which opens backwards, a characteristic unique to docodontans. The malleus (also known as the articular) sends down a particularly well-developed prong known as the manubrium, which is sensitive to vibrations. The incus (also known as the quadrate) is still relatively large and rests against the petrosal bone of the braincase, a remnant of a pre-mammalian style jaw joint. In true mammals, the postdentary elements detach fully and shrink further, becoming the ossicles of the middle ear and embracing a circular eardrum.

==== Cranium and throat ====
Docodontan skulls are generally fairly low, and in general form are similar to other early mammaliforms such as morganucodonts. The snout is long and has several plesiomorphic traits: the nares (bony nostril holes) are small and paired, rather than fused into a single opening, and the rear edge of each naris is formed by a large septomaxilla, a bone which is no longer present in mammals. The nasal bones expand at the back and overlook thick lacrimals. The frontal and parietal bones of the skull roof are flat and broad, and there is no postorbital process forming the rear rim of the orbit (eye socket).

Docodontans also see the first occurrence of a mammalian-style saddle-shaped complex of hyoids (throat bones). Microdocodon and Megacauda have a straight, sideways-oriented basihyal which connects to two pairs of bony structures: the anterior hyoid cornu (a jointed series of rods which snake up to the braincase), and the posterior thyrohyals (which link to the thyroid cartilage). This hyoid system affords greater strength and flexibility than the simple, U-shaped hyoids of earlier cynodonts. It allows for a narrower and more muscular throat and tongue, which are correlated with uniquely mammalian behaviors such as suckling. The palatine and pterygoid bones of Megacauda are very similar in structure to therian mammals, providing further support for strong throat muscles in docodonts.

==== Postcranial skeleton ====
The oldest unambiguous fossil evidence of hair is found in a well-preserved specimen of the docodontan Castorocauda, though hair likely evolved much earlier in synapsids. The structure of the vertebral column is variable between docodontans, as with many other mammaliaforms. The components of the atlas are unfused, attaching to the large and porous occipital condyles of the braincase. Vertebrae at the base of the tail often have expanded transverse processes (rib pedestals), supporting powerful tail musculature. Most docodontans have gradually shrinking ribs, forming a subdued transition between the thoracic and lumbar regions of the spine. However, this developmental trait is not universal. For example, Agilodocodon lacks lumbar ribs, so it has an abrupt transition from the thoracic to lumbar vertebrae like many modern mammals.

The forelimbs and hindlimbs generally have strong muscle attachments, and the olecranon process of the ulna is flexed inwards. All limb bones except the tibia lack epiphyses, plate-like ossified cartilage caps which terminate bone growth in adulthood. This suggests that docodontan bones continued growing throughout their lifetime, like some other mammaliaforms and early mammals. The ankle is distinctive, with a downturned calcaneum and a stout astragalus which connects to the tibia via a trochlea (pulley-like joint). The only known specimen of Castorocauda has a pointed spur on its ankle, similar to defensive structures observed in male monotremes and several other early-branching mammals.

=== Teeth ===
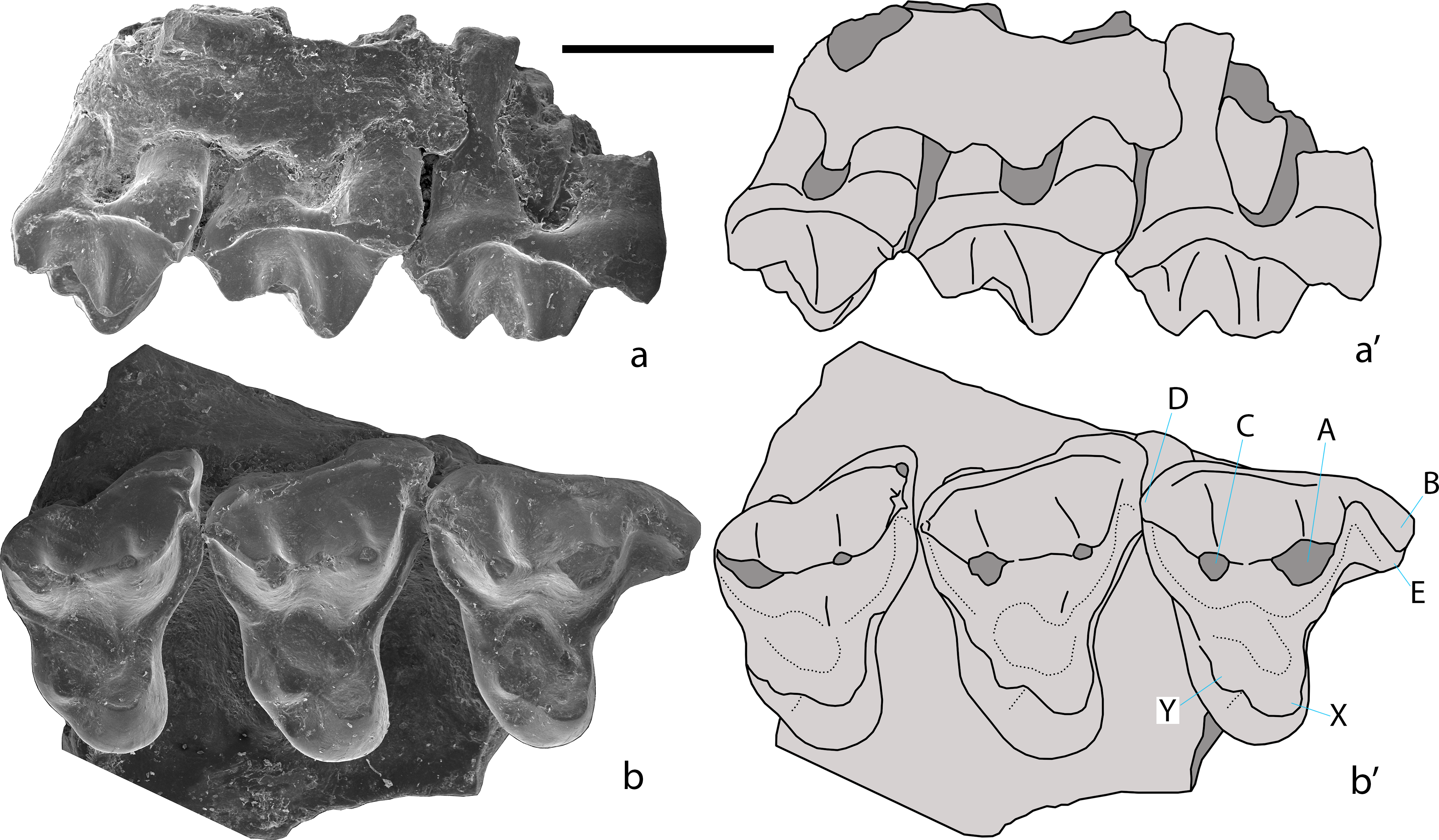
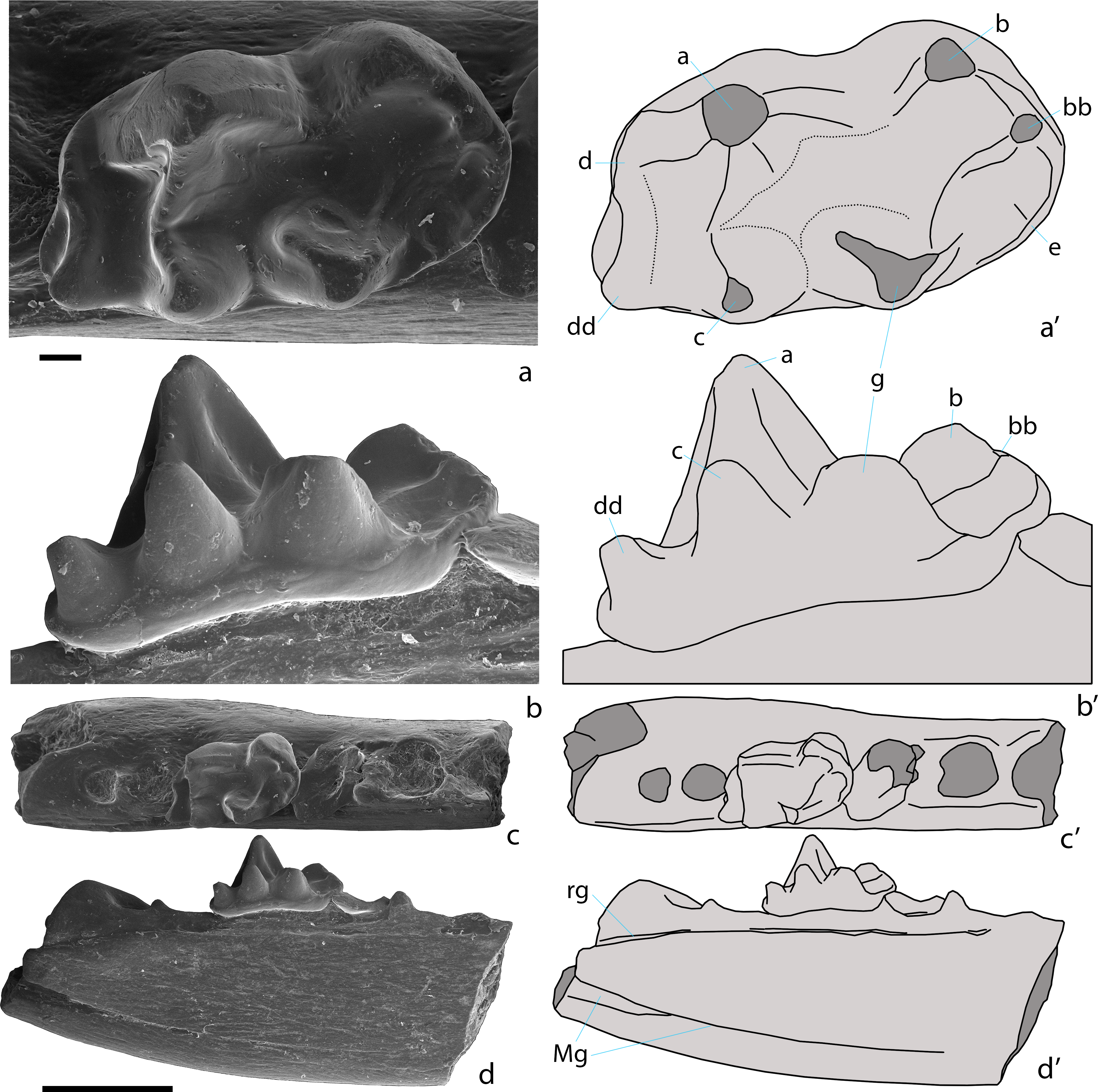
Toothed jaw fragments and molar teeth of Khorotherium yakutensis, from the Early Cretaceous of Russia. Right maxilla (upper two rows) and left dentary (lower four rows)

Like other mammaliaforms, docodontan teeth include peg-like incisors, fang-like canines, and numerous interlocking premolars and molars. Most mammaliaforms have fairly simple molars primarily suited for shearing and slicing food. Docodontans, on the other hand, have developed specialized molars with crushing surfaces. The shape of each molar is defined by a characteristic pattern of conical cusps, with sharp, concave crests connecting the center of each cusp to adjacent cusps.

==== Upper molars ====
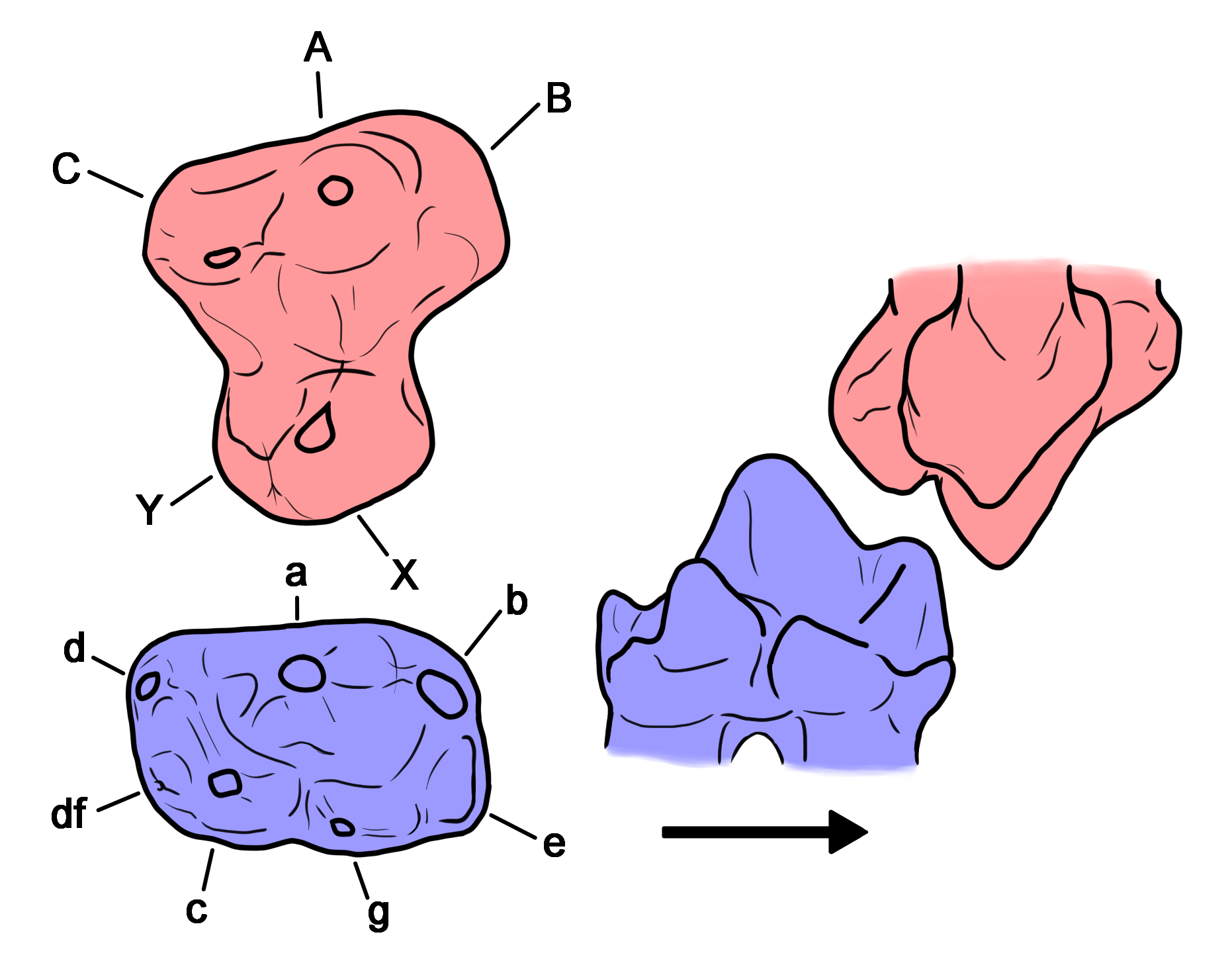
Molar teeth of Haldanodon expectatus, from the Late Jurassic of Portugal. Upper (maxilla) molars are pink and lower (dentary) molars are blue. Anterior is to the right. * Left side: right maxilla molar and left dentary molar in occlusal view (looking onto the teeth). Cusp nomenclature is labelled. * Right side: left maxilla and dentary molars in lingual view (from the perspective of the tongue, right).

When seen from below, the upper molars have an overall subtriangular or figure-eight shape, wider (from side to side) than they are long (from front to back). The bulk of the tooth makes up four major cusps: cusps A, C, X, and Y. This overall structure is similar to the tribosphenic teeth found in true therian mammals, like modern marsupials and placentals. However, there is little consensus for homologizing docodontan cusps with those of modern mammals.

Cusps A and C lie in a row along the labial edge of the tooth (i.e., on the outer side, facing the cheek). Cusp A is located in front of cusp C and is typically the largest cusp in the upper molars. Cusp X lies lingual to cusp A (i.e., positioned inwards, towards the midline of the skull). A distinct wear facet is found on the labial edge of cusp X, extending along the crest leading to cusp A. Cusp Y, a unique feature of docodontans, is positioned directly behind cusp X. Many docodontans have one or two additional cusps (cusps B and E) in front of cusp A. Cusp B is almost always present and is usually shifted slightly labial relative to cusp A. Cusp E, which may be absent in later docodontans, is positioned lingual to cusp B.

==== Lower molars ====
The lower molars are longer than wide. On average, they have seven cusps arranged in two rows. The labial/outer row has the largest cusp, cusp a, which lies between two more cusps. The other major labial cusps are cusp b (a slightly smaller cusp in front of cusp a) and cusp d (a much smaller cusp behind cusp a). The lingual/inner row is shifted backwards (relative to the labial row) and has two large cusps: cusp g (at the front) and cusp c (at the back).

Two additional lingual cusps may be present: cusp e and cusp df. Cusp e lies in front of cusp g and is roughly lingual to cusp b. Cusp df ("docodont cuspule f") lies behind cusp c and is lingual to cusp d. There is some variation in the relative sizes, position, or even presence of some of these cusps, though docodontans in general have a fairly consistent cusp pattern.

==== Tooth occlusion ====
A distinct concavity or basin is apparent in the front half of each lower molar, between cusps a, g, and b. This basin has been named the pseudotalonid. When the upper and lower teeth occlude (fit together), the pseudotalonid acts as a receptacle for cusp Y of the upper molar. Cusp Y is often termed the "pseudoprotocone" in this relationship. At the same time, cusp b of the lower molar shears into an area labial to cusp Y. Occlusion is completed when the rest of the upper molar slides between adjacent lower molar teeth, letting the rear edge of the preceding lower molar scrape against cusp X. This shearing-and-grinding process is more specialized than in any other early mammaliaform.

"Pseudotalonid" and "pseudoprotocone" are names which reference the talonid-and-protocone crushing complex which characterize tribosphenic teeth. Tribosphenic teeth show up in the oldest fossils of therians, the mammalian subgroup containing marsupials and placentals. This is a case of convergent evolution, as therian talonids lie at the back of the lower molar rather than the front. The opposite is true for docodontan teeth, which have been described as "pseudotribosphenic".

Pseudotribosphenic teeth are also found in shuotheriids, an unusual collection of Jurassic mammals with tall pointed cusps. Relative to docodontans, shuotheriids have pseudotalonids which are positioned further forwards in their lower molars. This is potentially another case of convergent evolution, as shuotheriid are often considered true mammals related to modern monotremes. Docodontan and shuotheriid teeth are so similar that some genera, namely Itatodon and Paritatodon, have been considered members of either group. A 2024 study, describing the new shuotheriid Feredocodon, even proposed that shuotheriids and docodontans were most closely related to each other among mammaliaforms. The study named a new clade, Docodontiformes, to encompass the two groups.

== Paleoecology and paleobiology ==
Docodontan ecological variation
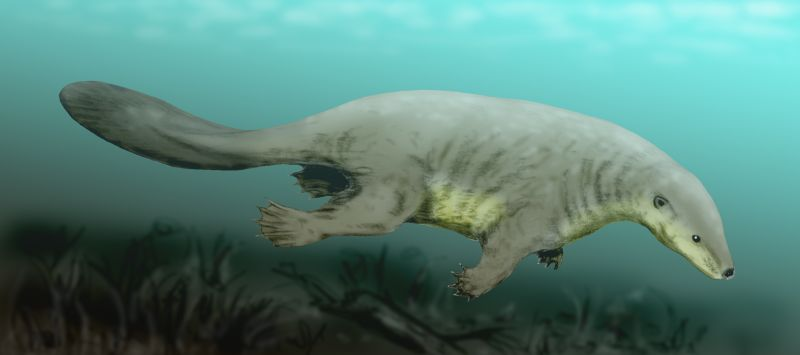
Castorocauda, an otter-like semiaquatic piscivore

Docofossor, a golden mole-like burrower

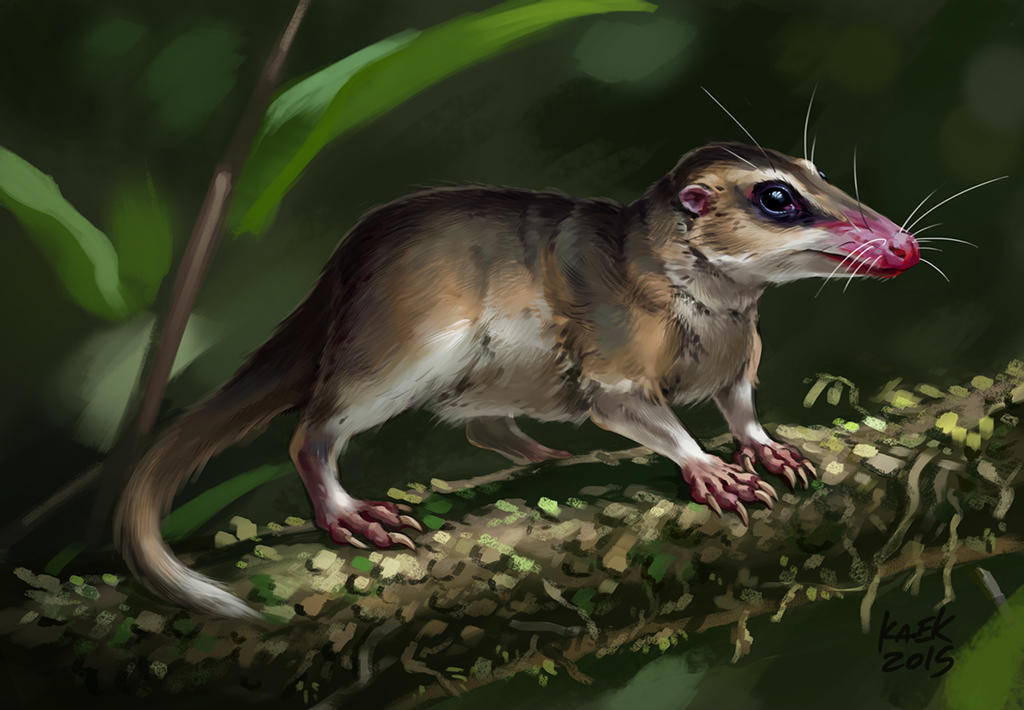
Agilodocodon, a tree shrew-like arboreal insectivore

Docodontans and other Mesozoic mammals were traditionally thought to have been primarily ground dwelling and insectivorous, but recent more complete fossils from China have shown that they were capable of greater ecological diversity. Castorocauda from the Middle Jurassic of China, and possibly Haldanodon from the Upper Jurassic of Portugal, were specialised for a semi-aquatic lifestyle. Castorocauda had a flattened tail, similar to that of a beaver, and recurved molar cusps, which suggests a possible diet of fish or aquatic invertebrates. Its close relative Megacauda shares similar adaptations. Docodontans may have had tendencies towards semi-aquatic habits, given their presence in wetland environments, although this could also be explained by the ease with which these environments preserve fossils compared with more terrestrial ones.

Recent discoveries of other complete docodontans such as the specialised digging species Docofossor, and specialised tree-dweller Agilodocodon suggest Docodonta were more ecologically diverse than previously suspected. Docofossor shows many of the same physical traits as the modern day golden mole, such as wide, shortened digits in the hands for digging.

=== Metabolism and lifespan ===
A 2024 study on adult and juvenile Krusatodon specimens found that docodontans had a slower metabolism and lower growth rates relative to modern mammals of the same size. The juvenile, which was 7 to 24 months old at the time of its death, was only 49% through the process of replacing its deciduous teeth with permanent (adult) teeth. Based on jaw length, the juvenile was 51-59% the weight of the 7-year-old adult. The closest comparisons among modern mammals were monotremes and hyraxes, though Krusatodon was much smaller than either, at fewer than 156 g in adult body mass. The authors propose that the standard condition in modern small mammals (very high metabolism, rapid growth, and short lifespan) would not be adopted until true mammals in the Jurassic mammals. In addition, docodontans contradict earlier assumptions that high metabolism evolved in sync with ecological diversity, since their diversity far outpaces their metabolism.

== Classification ==
The lineage of Docodonta evolved prior to the origin of living mammals: monotremes, marsupials, and placentals. In other words, docodontans are outside of the mammalian crown group, which only includes animals descended from the last common ancestor of living mammals. Previously, docodontans were sometimes regarded as belonging to Mammalia, owing to the complexity of their molars and the fact that they possess a dentary-squamosal jaw joint. However, modern authors usually limit the term "Mammalia" to the crown group, excluding earlier mammaliaforms like the docodontans. Nevertheless, docodontans are still closely related to crown-Mammalia, to a greater extent than many other early mammaliaform groups such as Morganucodonta and Sinoconodon. Some authors also consider docodontans to lie crownward of the order Haramiyida, though most others consider haramiyidans to be closer to mammals than docodontans are. Docodontans may lie crownward of haramiyidans in phylogenetic analyses based on maximum parsimony, but shift stemward relative to haramiyidans when the same data is put through a Bayesian analysis.

Cladogram based on a phylogenetic analysis of Zhou et al. (2019) focusing on a wide range of mammaliamorphs:

- Mammaliaformes
  - †Morganucodonta
  - - †Docodonta
      - Haldanodon
      - - Docofossor
        - - Castorocauda
          - - Agilodocodon
            - Microdocodon
    - - †Hadrocodium
      - - †Haramiyida
        - Mammalia
          - Yinotheria (including Monotremata)
          - - †Fruitafossor
            - Theriimorpha (including Metatheria and Eutheria)

Docodontan fossils have been recognized since the 1880s, but their relationships and diversity have only recently been well-established. Monographs by George Gaylord Simpson in the 1920s argued that they were specialized "pantotheres", part of a broad group ancestral to true therian mammals according to their complex molars. A 1956 paper by Bryan Patterson instead argued that docodontan teeth were impossible to homologize with modern mammals. He drew comparisons to the teeth of Morganucodon and other "triconodont" mammaliaforms, which had fairly simple lower molars with a straight row of large cusps. However, re-evaluations of mammaliaform tooth homology in the late 1990s established that docodontans were not closely related to either morganucodonts or therians. Instead, they were found to be similar to certain early "symmetrodonts", a broad and polyphyletic grouping of mammaliaforms with triangular upper molars.

The closest relatives of Docodonta may have been certain Late Triassic "symmetrodonts", such as Delsatia and Woutersia (from the Norian-Rhaetian of France). These "symmetrodonts" have three major cusps (c, a, and b) set in a triangular arrangement on their lower molars. These cusps would be homologous to cusps c, a, and g in docodontans, which have a similar size and position. The lingual cusp (cusp X) is prominent in Woutersia. Another proposed docodontan relative, Tikitherium from India, was originally considered to have been a very early mammaliaform which lived during the Carnian stage of the Triassic. Later investigation found that Tikitherium was likely a misidentification of Neogene shrew teeth, completely unrelated to docodontans or any Mesozoic mammaliaforms.

Unambiguous docodontans are restricted to the Northern Hemisphere. The oldest docodontan is Nujalikodon, from the earliest Jurassic (Hettangian stage) of Greenland. Many more species appear in the fossil record in the Middle Jurassic. Very few docodontans survived into the Cretaceous Period; the youngest known members of the group are Sibirotherium and Khorotherium, from the Early Cretaceous of Siberia. One disputed docodont, Gondtherium, has been described from India, which was previously part of the Southern Hemisphere continent of Gondwana. However, this identification is not certain, and in recent analyses, Gondtherium falls outside the docodontan family tree, albeit as a close relative to the group. Reigitherium, from the Late Cretaceous of Argentina, has previously been described as a docodont, though it is now considered a meridiolestidan mammal. Some authors have suggested splitting Docodonta into two families (Simpsonodontidae and Tegotheriidae), but the monophyly of these groups (in their widest form) are not found in any other analyses, and therefore not accepted by all mammal palaeontologists.

Cladograms based on phylogenetic analyses focusing on docodontan relationships:

Topology of Zhou et al. (2019), based on tooth, cranial, and postcranial traits:

- Mammaliaformes
  - Morganucodonta
  - - Gondtherium
    - - Tikitherium
      - Docodonta
        - Castorocauda
        - - - Tashkumyrodon
            - - Dsungarodon
              - - Borealestes
                - - Haldanodon
                  - - Docodon
                    - Docofossor
          - - Itatodon
            - - Simpsonodon
              - - - Agilodocodon
                  - Krusatodon
                - - Sibirotherium
                  - - Hutegotherium
                    - - Microdocodon
                      - Tegotherium

Topology of Panciroli et al. (2021), based on dentary and tooth traits:

- - Sinoconodon
  - - Morganucodon
    - - Dinnetherium
      - - Megazostrodon
        - - Kuehneotherium
          - - - Delsatia
              - Woutersia
            - - Gondtherium
              - - Tikitherium
                - Docodonta
                  - Hutegotherium
                  - - - Sibirotherium
                      - Tegotherium
                    - - - Agilodocodon
                        - Krusatodon
                      - Simpsonodon
                      - Itatodon
                      - Tashkumyrodon
                      - - Castorocauda
                        - Dsungarodon
                      - - Dobunnodon
                        - - Borealestes
                          - - Docofossor
                            - - Docodon
                              - Haldanodon

=== Species ===
- Agilodocodon scansorius Meng et al. 2015
- Borealestes Waldman & Savage 1972
  - B. cuillinensis Panciroli et al. 2021
  - B. serendipitus Waldman & Savage 1972
- Castorocauda lutrasimilis Ji et al. 2006
- Cyrtlatherium canei Freeman 1979 sensu Sigogneau-Russell 2001 (dubious) [Simpsonodon oxfordensis Kermack et al. 1987]
- Dobunnodon mussettae [Borealestes mussetti] Sigogneau-Russell 2003 sensu Panciroli et al. 2021
- Docodon Marsh 1881 [Dicrocynodon Marsh in Osborn, 1888; Diplocynodon Marsh 1880 non Pomel 1847; Ennacodon Marsh 1890; Enneodon Marsh 1887 non Prangner 1845]
  - D. apoxys Rougier et al. 2014
  - D. hercynicus Martin et al. 2024
  - D. victor (Marsh 1880) [Dicrocynodon victor (Marsh 1880); Diplocynodon victor Marsh 1880]
  - D. striatus Marsh 1881 [disputed]
  - D. affinis (Marsh 1887) [Enneodon affinis Marsh 1887] [disputed]
  - D. crassus (Marsh 1887) [Enneodon crassus Marsh 1887; Ennacodon crassus (Marsh 1887)] [disputed]
  - D. superus Simpson 1929 [disputed]
- Docofossor brachydactylus Luo et al. 2015
- Dsungarodon zuoi Pfretzschner et al. 2005 [Acuodulodon Hu, Meng & Clark 2007; Acuodulodon sunae Hu, Meng & Clark 2007]
- Ergetiis ichchi Averianov et al. 2024
- Gondtherium dattai Prasad & Manhas 2007 [disputed]
- Haldanodon exspectatus Kühne & Krusat 1972 sensu Sigoneau-Russell 2003
- Hutegotherium yaomingi Averianov et al. 2010
- Itatodon tatarinovi Lopatin & Averianov 2005 [disputed, possibly a shuotheriid]
- Khorotherium yakutensis Averianov et al. 2018
- Krusatodon kirtlingtonensis Sigogneau-Russell 2003
- Megacauda sungei Li et al. 2026
- Microdocodon gracilis Zhou et al. 2019
- Nujalikodon cassiopeiae Patrocínio et al. 2025
- Paritatodon kermacki (Sigogneau-Russell, 1998) [disputed, possibly a shuotheriid]
- Peraiocynodon Simpson 1928
  - P. inexpectatus Simpson 1928 [possible synonym of Docodon]
  - P. major Sigogneau-Russell 2003 [disputed]
- Sibirotherium rossicus Maschenko, Lopatin & Voronkevich 2002
- Simpsonodon Kermack et al. 1987
  - S. splendens (Kühne 1969)
  - S. sibiricus Averianov et al. 2010
- Tashkumyrodon desideratus Martin & Averianov 2004
- Tegotherium gubini Tatarinov 1994

== See also ==
- Evolution of mammals
