= Tashkumyrodon =

Tashkumyrodon Temporal range: Callovian

Scientific classification
- Domain: Eukaryota
- Kingdom: Animalia
- Phylum: Chordata
- Clade: Synapsida
- Clade: Therapsida
- Clade: Cynodontia
- Clade: Mammaliaformes
- Order: †Docodonta
- Genus: †Tashkumyrodon; Martin & Averianov, 2004
- Species: †T. desideratus

Binomial name
- †Tashkumyrodon desideratus Martin & Averianov, 2004

Extinct genus of mammaliaforms

Tashkumyrodon is an extinct mammaliaform from the Middle Jurassic (Callovian) Balabansai Formation of Kyrgyzstan It is named after the town of Tash-Kömür, near where the original specimen was found. It belongs to the order Docodonta and is closely related to Sibirotherium and Tegotherium. There is only one species currently known, Tashkumyrodon desideratus.

The holotype fossil is a lower left molar. Like many Mesozoic mammaliaforms, it is only known from isolated teeth. The fossil is housed at the Zoological Institute of the Russian Academy of Sciences in St. Petersburg.
