= Delsatia =

Delsatia Temporal range: Late Triassic, Norian–Rhaetian

Scientific classification
- Domain: Eukaryota
- Kingdom: Animalia
- Phylum: Chordata
- Clade: Synapsida
- Clade: Therapsida
- Clade: Cynodontia
- Clade: Mammaliaformes
- Genus: †Delsatia; Sigogneau-Russell and Godefroit, 1997
- Species: †D. rhupotopi

Binomial name
- †Delsatia rhupotopi Sigogneau-Russell and Godefroit, 1997

Extinct genus of mammaliaforms

Delsatia is an early mammaliaform genus that lived during the Late Triassic and has been found in the Gres infralisiques Formation of France. The type species, D. rhupotopi, was named in 1997. It was originally tentatively placed within the Docodonta, but subsequent studies disagree with this; Delsatia is seen by most as a basal mammaliaform. The holotype, MNHN.F.SNP408W, is an incomplete, isolated tooth.
