= Gondtherium =

Gondtherium Temporal range: 167.3–127.2 Ma Middle Jurassic-Early Cretaceous

Scientific classification
- Domain: Eukaryota
- Kingdom: Animalia
- Phylum: Chordata
- Clade: Synapsida
- Clade: Therapsida
- Clade: Cynodontia
- Clade: Mammaliaformes
- Genus: †Gondtherium; Prasad and Manhas, 2007
- Species: †G. dattai

Binomial name
- †Gondtherium dattai Prasad and Manhas, 2007

Extinct genus of mammaliaforms

Gondtherium is a genus of extinct mammaliaform from the Kota Formation in India. It was considered a docodontan by those who described it, but it remains unclear if this is the case.

Gondtherium was found in the Kota Formation, which is considered to be between Middle Jurassic and Early Cretaceous in age. Other Mesozoic mammaliaforms found there include members of Morganucodonta and Amphilestidae. The authors who described Gondtherium - which is known from only a single worn and fragmentary molar tooth - considered it to be a docodontan based on the tooth cusps. However, this has been disputed by several subsequent researchers, and so the exact identity of Gondtherium remains unresolved.
