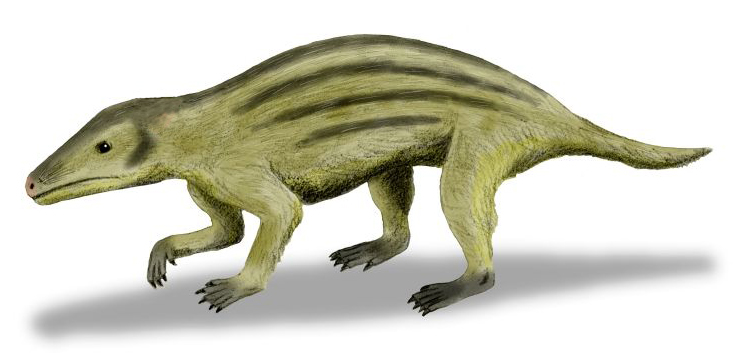
- Life restoration of Pseudotribos
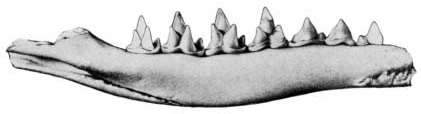
- Lower jaw of Shuotherium dongi

Scientific classification
- Domain: Eukaryota
- Kingdom: Animalia
- Phylum: Chordata
- Clade: Synapsida
- Clade: Therapsida
- Clade: Cynodontia
- Clade: Mammaliaformes
- Family: †Shuotheriidae; Chow and Rich, 1982

Genera
- †Feredocodon; †Pseudotribos; †Shuotherium; †Itatodon?; †Paritatodon?

= Shuotheriidae =

Shuotheriidae Temporal range: Middle-Late Jurassic

Extinct family of mammaliaforms

Shuotheriidae is a small family of Jurassic mammaliaforms whose remains are found in China, Great Britain and possibly Russia. They have been proposed to be close relatives of Australosphenida (which often controversially includes monotremes), together forming the clade Yinotheria. However, some studies suggest shuotheres are closer to therians than to monotremes, or that australosphenidans and therians are more closely related to each other than either are to shuotheres, with a 2024 study suggesting that shuotheriids were closely related to Docodonta outside of the Mammalia crown group.
