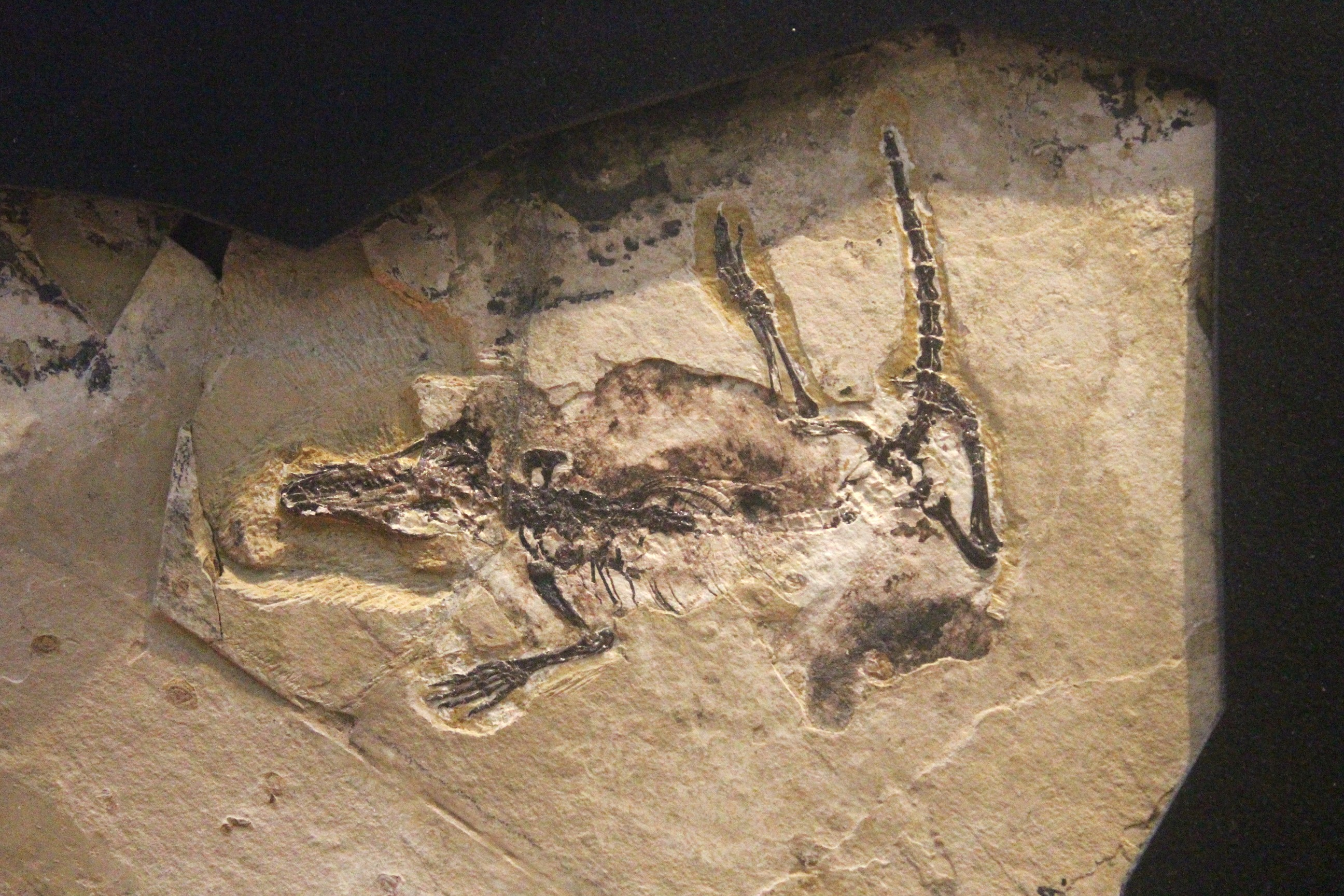
- Holotype specimen (BMNH 001138) of A. scansorius, National Natural History Museum of China

Scientific classification
- Kingdom: Animalia
- Phylum: Chordata
- Clade: Synapsida
- Clade: Therapsida
- Clade: Cynodontia
- Clade: Mammaliaformes
- Order: †Docodonta
- Genus: †Agilodocodon; Meng et al., 2015
- Species: †A. scansorius

Binomial name
- †Agilodocodon scansorius Meng et al., 2015

= Agilodocodon =

Agilodocodon Temporal range: Callovian ~164.7–161.2 Ma

Extinct genus of mammaliaforms

Agilodocodon was a genus of shrew-sized docodont from the Middle Jurassic, believed to be the earliest known tree-climbing mammaliaform. It contains one species, A. scansorius.

== Appearance ==
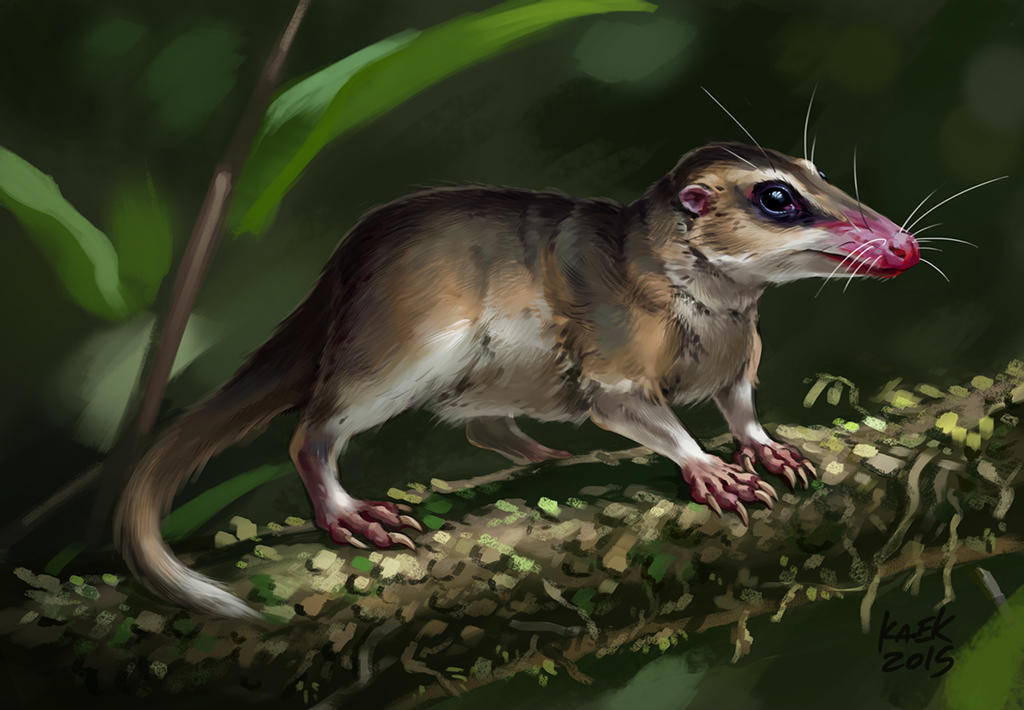
Life restoration of A. scansorius

Agilodocodon measured approximately 13 centimetres (5.1 in) from head to tail, weighing about 27 grams. Its appearance was similar to a squirrel, with a long snout, curved, horny claws and flexible ankle and wrist joints typical of modern arboreal mammals. The front teeth were spade-like, indicating that Agilodocodon could gnaw tree bark and consume gum or sap. Evolutionary biologist Frietson Galis, however, questioned whether Agilodocodon gnawed bark and ate tree sap, saying its teeth "are quite different" from the modern sap-eating primates, and the long, thin lower jaw seems too weak for chomping on tree bark.

== Discovery ==
The fossil of Agilodocodon scansorius, holotype BMNH 001138, along with that of Docofossor brachydactylus, was originally found by farmers in the Chinese Tiaojishan Formation and acquired by the Beijing Museum of Natural History. The type species Agilodocodon scansorius was named and described in the journal Science in 2015. The generic name refers to the membership of the Docodonta and the agility. The specific name refers to the scansorial lifestyle.
