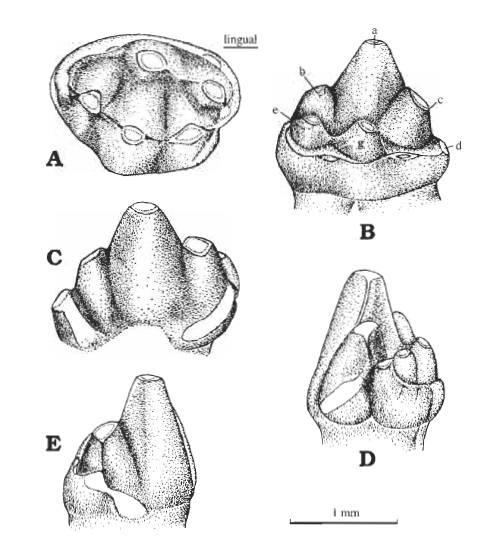
- Woutersia butleri

Scientific classification
- Domain: Eukaryota
- Kingdom: Animalia
- Phylum: Chordata
- Clade: Synapsida
- Clade: Therapsida
- Clade: Cynodontia
- Clade: Mammaliaformes
- Family: †Woutersiidae; Sigogneau-Russell, 1983
- Genus: †Woutersia; Sigogneau-Russell, 1983

Species
- †W. mirabilis Sigogneau-Russell, 1983 (type); †W. butleri Sigogneau-Russell & Hahn, 1995

= Woutersia =

Woutersia Temporal range: Rhaetian ~210–201 Ma

Extinct genus of mammaliaforms

Woutersia was a Triassic genus of 'symmetrodont' and the only representative of the family Woutersiidae. It was originally classified as a kuehneotheriid, but it has been suggested that it may be related to Docodonta. Remains of W. mirabilis and W. butleri have been found in the Gres à Avicula contorta Formation at Saint-Nicolas-de-Port, France, while W. mirabilis has been found in Varangéville, France; remains have been dated to the Late Triassic, 205.6 to 201.6 Ma.
