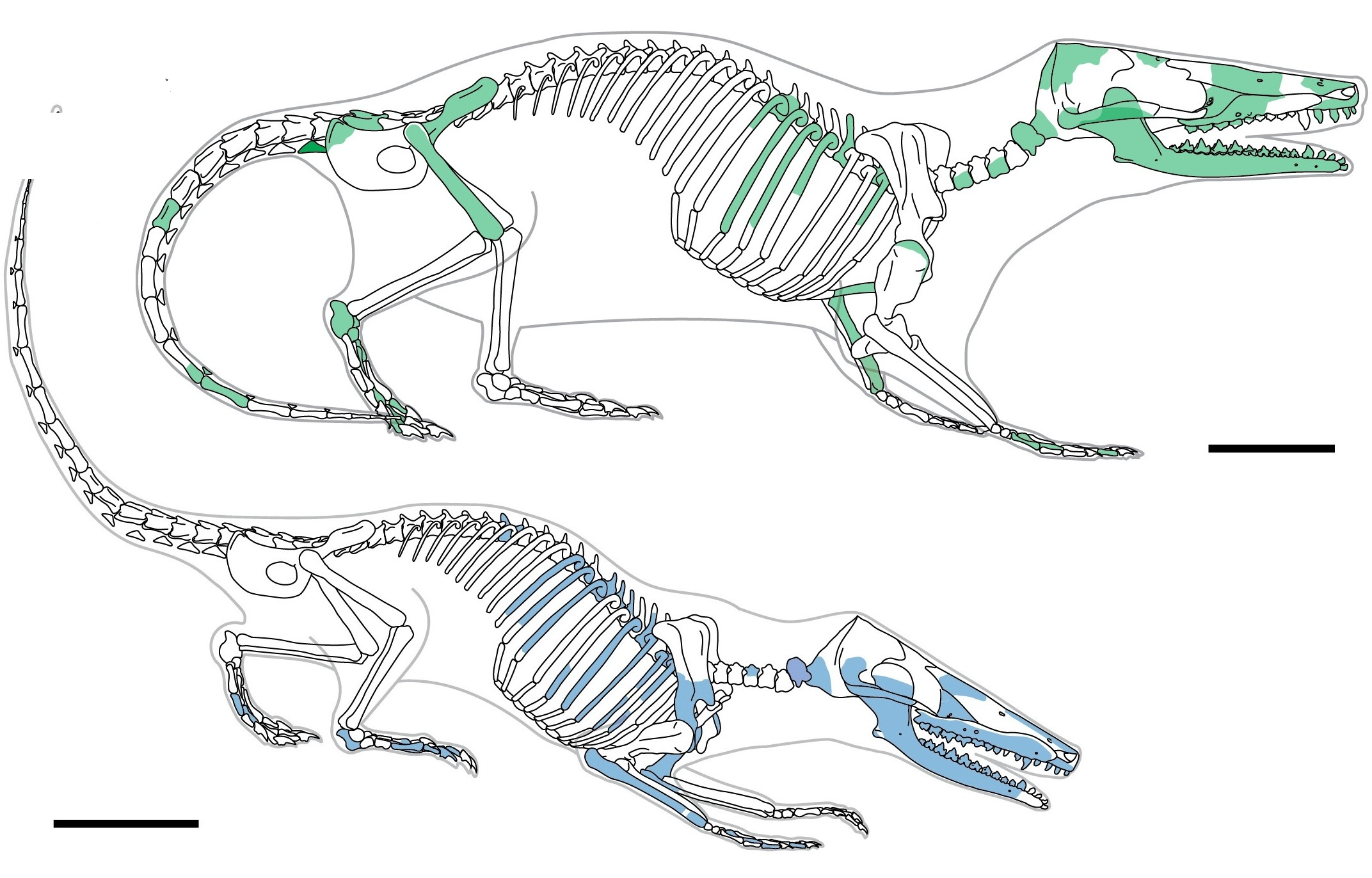
- Skeletal diagrams of B. serendipitus (green) and B. cuillinensis (blue) Scale bars = 10 mm

Scientific classification
- Kingdom: Animalia
- Phylum: Chordata
- Clade: Synapsida
- Clade: Therapsida
- Clade: Cynodontia
- Clade: Mammaliaformes
- Order: †Docodonta
- Genus: †Borealestes; Waldman and Savage, 1972

Type species
- †Borealestes serendipitus Waldman and Savage, 1972

Other species
- †B. cuillinensis Panciroli et al. (2021)

= Borealestes =

Borealestes Temporal range: Middle Jurassic Bathonian

Extinct genus of mammaliaforms

Borealestes is a genus of docodontan from the Middle Jurassic of Scotland, first discovered on the Isle of Skye near the village of Elgol. It was the earliest mammaliaform from the Mesozoic found and named in Scotland. A second species and was later found in other Middle Jurassic sites in England, but is now shown to be a different genus. A new species, B. cuillinensis was named in 2021, also from Skye.

== Etymology ==
The genus name is derived from the Greek Boreas and Latin Boreal, meaning northern, the Greek listís meaning brigand or rogue. The specific name of B. serendipitus comes from the noun serendipity, relating to making a happy and unexpected discovery by accident. The species name B. cuillinensis comes from the Cuillin mountains on Skye, which are near the discovery site, and the cusps of the teeth resemble the peaks of the mountains.

== Discovery ==
The first fossil of Borealestes serendipitus was discovered by Michael Waldman during a school field trip he was leading on the Isle of Skye in 1971. The holotype is a fragment of jaw containing five molars and three premolars (BRSUG 20572) and there were several other jaw fragments collected in the following years, and a partial skeleton, all of them from the Kilmaluag Formation. Michael Waldman and Robert J. G. Savage then carried out multiple trips to the island in search of mammals and other fossils. They named Borealestes at the same time as a new species of tritylodontid, Stereognathus 'hebridicus' (now synonymised with S. ooliticus).

In 2003, Borealestes mussettae (originally 'B. mussetti') was named from isolated molars found in the Bathonian aged Kirtlington Mammal bed of Oxfordshire, England. Both of these localities belong to the Forest Marble Formation. It was named mussetti in honour of Frances Mussett, in recognition of her major participation in fossil excavation at Kirtlington Cement Quarry. However, mussetti is the masculine form, and so this has been amended to mussettae by subsequent authors. It was recently recognised as different from Borealestes, and so moved to the newly erected genus Dobunnodon in 2021.

A new species, B. cuillinensis, was named in 2021 based on a partial skeleton found in the same site in the Kilmaluag Formation, Scotland. It was found in 2018 by Prof Richard Butler of the University of Birmingham, during fieldwork on the island.

== Appearance ==
Borealestes is currently known from two partial skeletons which include skull bones, jaws, and postcrania, multiple isolated teeth, and ear bones (petrosals).

Docodontans are small (shrew to rat sized) mammaliaforms - the wider grouping that includes mammalians and their closest relatives. Borealestes is believed to be a basal member of Docodonta.
