= Sibirotherium =

Sibirotherium Temporal range: Aptian

Scientific classification
- Domain: Eukaryota
- Kingdom: Animalia
- Phylum: Chordata
- Clade: Synapsida
- Clade: Therapsida
- Clade: Cynodontia
- Clade: Mammaliaformes
- Order: †Docodonta
- Genus: †Sibirotherium; Maschenko, Lopatin & Voronkevich 2002
- Species: †S. rossicum

Binomial name
- †Sibirotherium rossicum Maschenko, Lopatin & Voronkevich 2002

Extinct genus of mammaliaform

Sibirotherium is an extinct genus of docodont mammaliaform. It is known from only a single named species, Sibirotherium rossicum, known from jaw fragments and teeth found in the Early Cretaceous (Aptian) aged Ilek Formation in western Siberia, alongside Khorotherium also from Siberia, it is one of the youngest docodonts.
