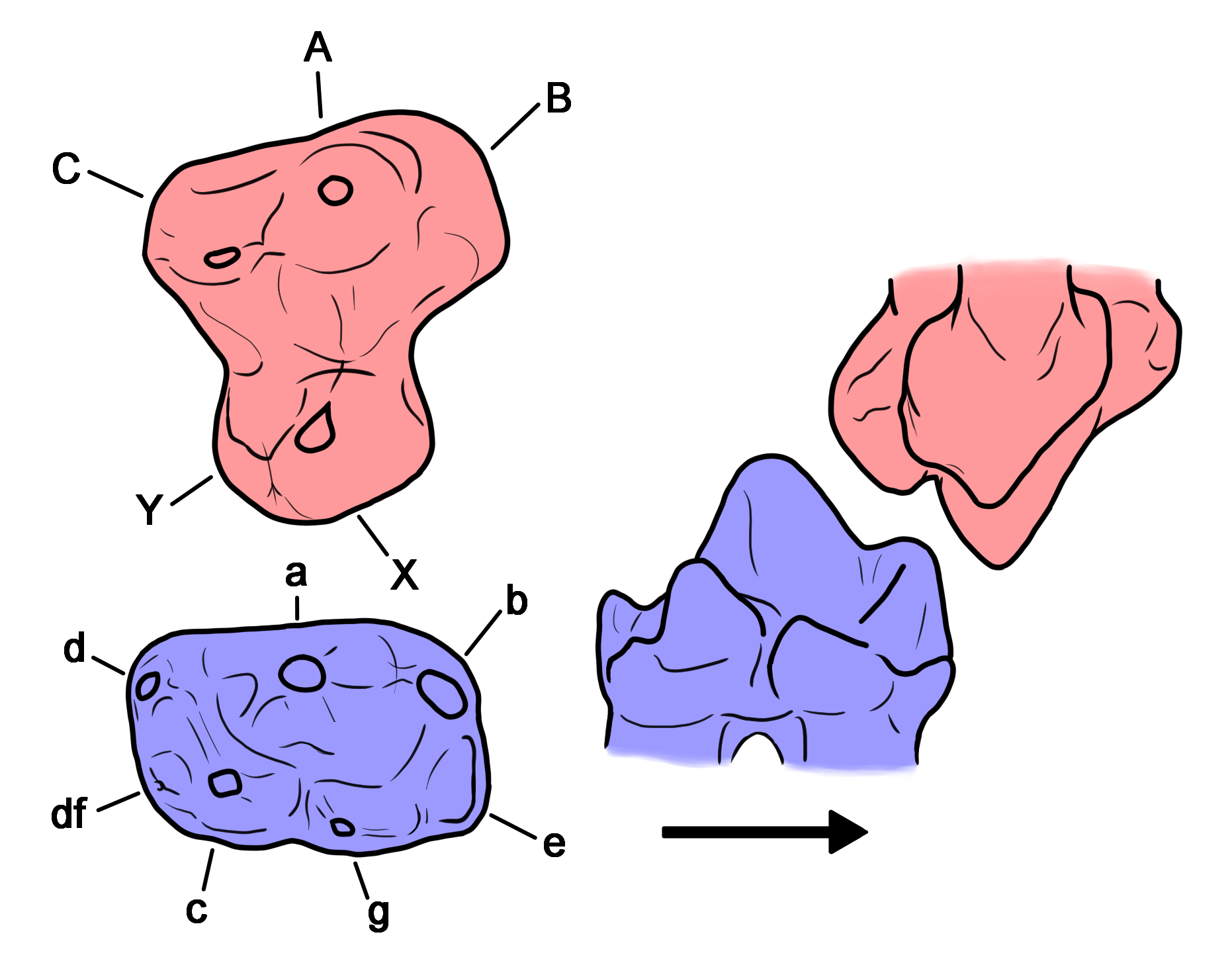
- Molar teeth in occlusal view (left) and medial view (right)

Scientific classification
- Kingdom: Animalia
- Phylum: Chordata
- Clade: Synapsida
- Clade: Therapsida
- Clade: Cynodontia
- Clade: Mammaliaformes
- Order: †Docodonta
- Family: †Docodontidae
- Genus: †Haldanodon; Kühne & Krusat, 1972
- Species: †H. exspectatus

Binomial name
- †Haldanodon exspectatus Kühne & Krusat, 1972

= Haldanodon =

Haldanodon Temporal range: Kimmeridgian, 145 Ma

Extinct genus of mammaliaforms

Haldanodon is an extinct docodont mammaliaform which lived in the Upper Jurassic (Kimmeridgian, about 145 million years ago). Its fossil remains have been found in Portugal, in the well-known fossil locality of Guimarota, which is in the Alcobaça Formation. It may have been a semi-aquatic burrowing insectivore, similar in habits to desmans and the platypus. Several specimens are known, include a partial skeleton and well-preserved skulls.

== Description ==
Haldanodon was about as long as a desman, and may have had a similar ecology. The skull was low and triangular when seen from above. For many years it had the best-known skull material of any docodont, making it vital for understanding the taxonomic position of that mammaliaform group. It was the first Mesozoic mammaliaform discovered to possess turbinal plates, a complex feature of mammalian nasal cavities. However, it also retained some curiously primitive traits in common with non-mammaliaform cynodonts.

The body was compact and the legs were short and robust. The articulation of the distal humerus was particularly expanded, indicating strong muscles for either digging or swimming. The front paws were relatively short, and the bones of the forelimb were curved and laterally compressed.

== Classification ==
Haldanodon was a docodont, part of a group of Jurassic to Cretaceous early mammaliaforms with specialized teeth The docodonts were widespread in Laurasia, and show an interesting diversity of ecological lifestyles unknown in other Mesozoic mammaliaforms. Haldanodon is specifically considered a docodontid, and has been found as the sister taxon to Docodon in many analyses.

Phylogeny

- Mammaliaformes
  - Adelobasileus
  - - Sinoconodon
    - - - Morganucodon
        - Megazostrodon
      - - Haramiyida
        - - - Haldanodon
            - Castorocauda
          - - Hadrocodium
            - Mammalia

== Paleobiology ==
=== Life history ===
Compared to extant mammals, Haldanodon had a slower rate of growth and a lower basal metabolic rate. Its mandibular incisor eruption sequence had an alternating pattern, with i_{2} and i_{4} being replaced early by I_{2} and I_{4} and i_{1} and i_{3} being replaced later. Both the maxillary and mandibular premolars were sequentially replaced from anterior to posterior premolars, but with the p^{2} and p_{2} both being lost and not replaced by permanent premolars.

=== Locomotion ===
Haldanodon may have been a fossorial (burrowing) and/or semi-aquatic insectivore, similar in lifestyle to the modern desmans and Ornithorhynchus (the duck-billed platypus). This is indicated by some skeletal features, such as a wide scapula and stout limb bones with specialized joints. It likely had a sprawling gait based on the configuration of its limb joints, but this is probably a result of its specialized lifestyle instead of a primitive trait. The fingers and claws of the forelimb seem to correspond closely to scratch-digging modern mammals like armadillos and pangolins, rather than shovel-diggers like moles.
