= Itatodon =

Itatodon Temporal range: Bathonian ~167–165 Ma

Scientific classification
- Domain: Eukaryota
- Kingdom: Animalia
- Phylum: Chordata
- Clade: Synapsida
- Clade: Therapsida
- Clade: Cynodontia
- Clade: Mammaliamorpha
- Clade: Mammaliaformes
- Genus: †Itatodon; Lopatin & Averianov, 2005
- Species: †I. tatarinovi

Binomial name
- †Itatodon tatarinovi Lopatin & Averianov, 2005

Extinct family of mammaliaforms

Itatodon is an extinct genus of primitive mammaliaforms known from the Bathonian aged Itat Formation of Russia. The genus is named after the formation, with the species being named after Leonid Petrovich Tatarinov who described the first docodont from Asia. It is known from a holotype right lower molar and referred isolated right lower molar and fragment of the left lower molar. When it was first described, it was thought to be a docodontan, but one recent phylogenetic studies have assigned it, along with its close relative Paritatodon to Shuotheriidae, while others continue to consider it a docodont.
