= Simpsonodon =

Simpsonodon Temporal range: Bathonian-Callovian ~165–162 Ma

Scientific classification
- Domain: Eukaryota
- Kingdom: Animalia
- Phylum: Chordata
- Clade: Synapsida
- Clade: Therapsida
- Clade: Cynodontia
- Clade: Mammaliaformes
- Order: †Docodonta
- Genus: †Simpsonodon; Kermack et al, 1987

Type species
- †Simpsonodon oxfordensis Kermack et al, 1987

Other species
- †S. sibiricus (Averianov et al, 2010)

Extinct genus of mammaliaforms

Simpsonodon is an extinct genus of docodontan mammaliaform known from the Middle Jurassic of England, Kyrgyzstan and Russia. The type species S. oxfordensis was described from the Kirtlington Mammal Bed and Watton Cliff in the Forest Marble Formation of England. It was named after George Gaylord Simpson, a pioneering mammalologist and contributor to the Modern Evolutionary Synthesis. A second species S. sibiricus is known from the Itat Formation of Russia, and indeterminate species of the genus are also known from the Balabansai Formation in Kyrgyzstan
