= Tegotherium =

Tegotherium Temporal range: Late Jurassic

Scientific classification
- Kingdom: Animalia
- Phylum: Chordata
- Clade: Synapsida
- Clade: Therapsida
- Clade: Cynodontia
- Clade: Mammaliaformes
- Order: †Docodonta
- Family: †Tegotheriidae
- Genus: †Tegotherium; Tatarinov, 1994
- Species: †T. gubini

Binomial name
- †Tegotherium gubini Tatarinov, 1994

Extinct genus of mammaliaforms

Tegotherium is an extinct mammaliaform from the Late Jurassic of East Asia. The type species T. gubini is known from the Shar Teeg Beds of Mongolia and an indeterminate species is also known from the Late Jurassic Qigu Formation of China. It belongs to the clade Docodonta.
