= Krusatodon =

Krusatodon Temporal range: Middle Jurassic, 174.1–163.5 Ma

Scientific classification
- Kingdom: Animalia
- Phylum: Chordata
- Clade: Synapsida
- Clade: Therapsida
- Clade: Cynodontia
- Clade: Mammaliaformes
- Order: †Docodonta
- Family: †Tegotheriidae
- Genus: †Krusatodon; Sigogneau-Russell, 2003
- Species: †K. kirtlingtonensis

Binomial name
- †Krusatodon kirtlingtonensis Sigogneau-Russell, 2003

Extinct genus of mammaliaforms

Krusatodon is a genus of extinct docodont mammaliaform from the Middle Jurassic of the United Kingdom. It is known from remains found in the Forest Marble Formation, England, and also from the Kilmaluag Formation on the Isle of Skye, Scotland.

== Etymology ==
The name Krusatodon honours the German zoologist and palaeontologist Dr. Georg Krusat, who carried out important research on docodonts and other early mammals.

== Description ==
Prior to 2024, Krusatodon was mainly known from a handful of individual molar teeth, and an undescribed jaw. In 2024, a juvenile and an adult skeleton of the species were described. Like all docodontans, these teeth have a more complex arrangement of cusps than other groups of early mammaliaforms (the group that includes mammals). This includes a large main cusp on the lower teeth (cusp a) and a number of smaller cusps around it, with a "pseudotalonid" - a basin where food can be crushed and ground. This arrangement is similar to the tribosphenic molar seen in later mammals.

Adult individuals were relatively small-sized compared to living mammals, with a body mass of 54–156 grams (0.119–0.344 lb).

== Paleobiology ==
Analysis of tooth histology suggests that Krusatodon had relatively long lives compared to modern mammals of similar size, with the adult skeleton described in 2024 estimated to have been 7 years old at the time of death.
