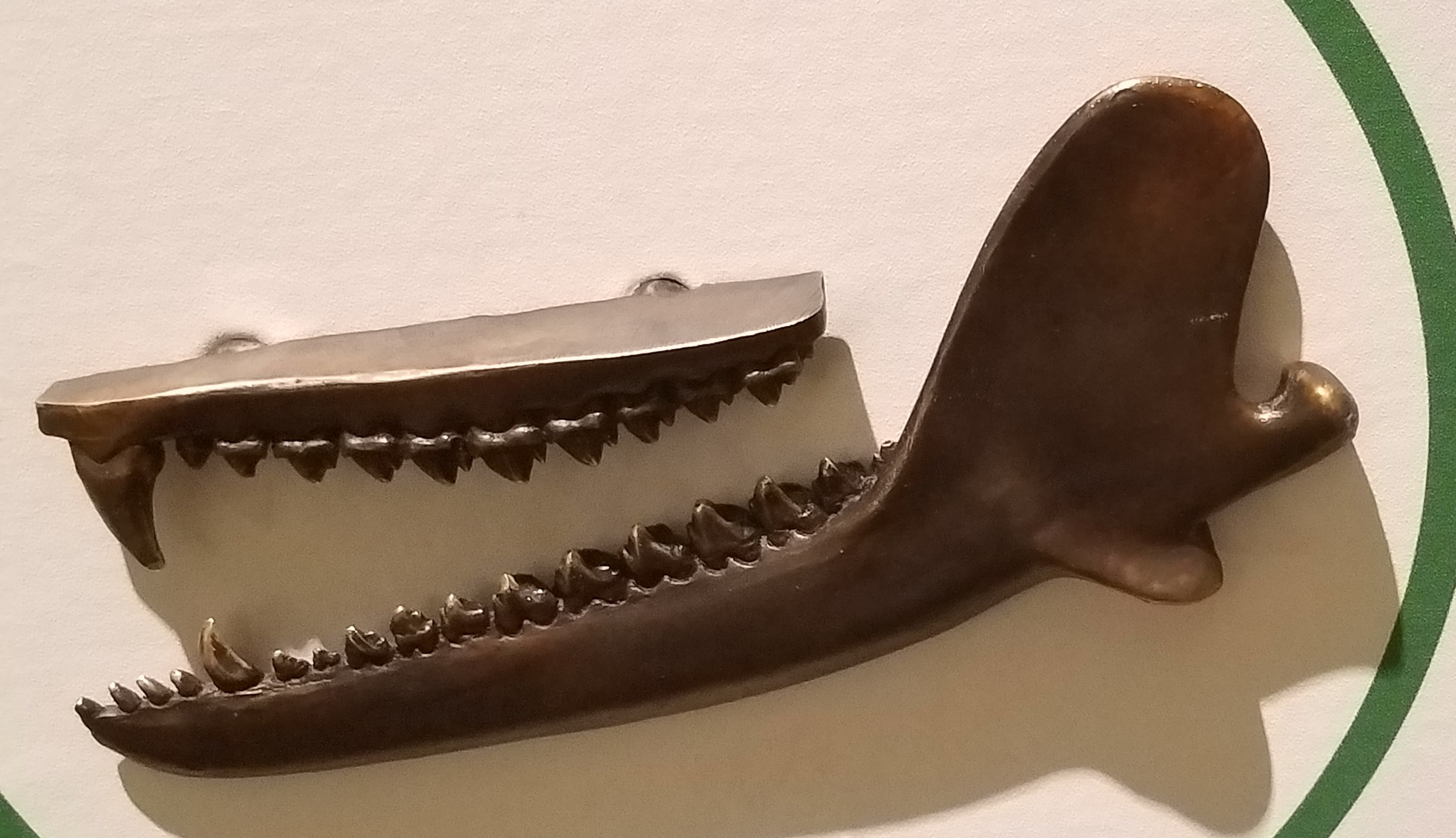
- Bronze model of upper and lower jaws

Scientific classification
- Kingdom: Animalia
- Phylum: Chordata
- Clade: Synapsida
- Clade: Therapsida
- Clade: Cynodontia
- Clade: Mammaliaformes
- Order: †Docodonta
- Family: †Docodontidae
- Genus: †Docodon; Marsh, 1881

Species
- D. victor (Marsh, 1880); D. affinis (Marsh, 1880)*; D. crassus (Marsh, 1880)*; D. striatus Marsh, 1881, type*; D. superus (Simpson, 1929)*; D. apoxys (Rougler, Sheth, Carpenter, Appella-Guiscafre & Davis, 2014); D. hercynicus Martin et al., 2024; *probable synonyms

= Docodon =

Docodon Temporal range: Upper Jurassic

Extinct genus of mammaliaforms

Docodon (meaning 'beam tooth') is an extinct genus of docodont mammaliaform from the Late Jurassic of Western North America. It was the first docodont to be named.

== Description ==
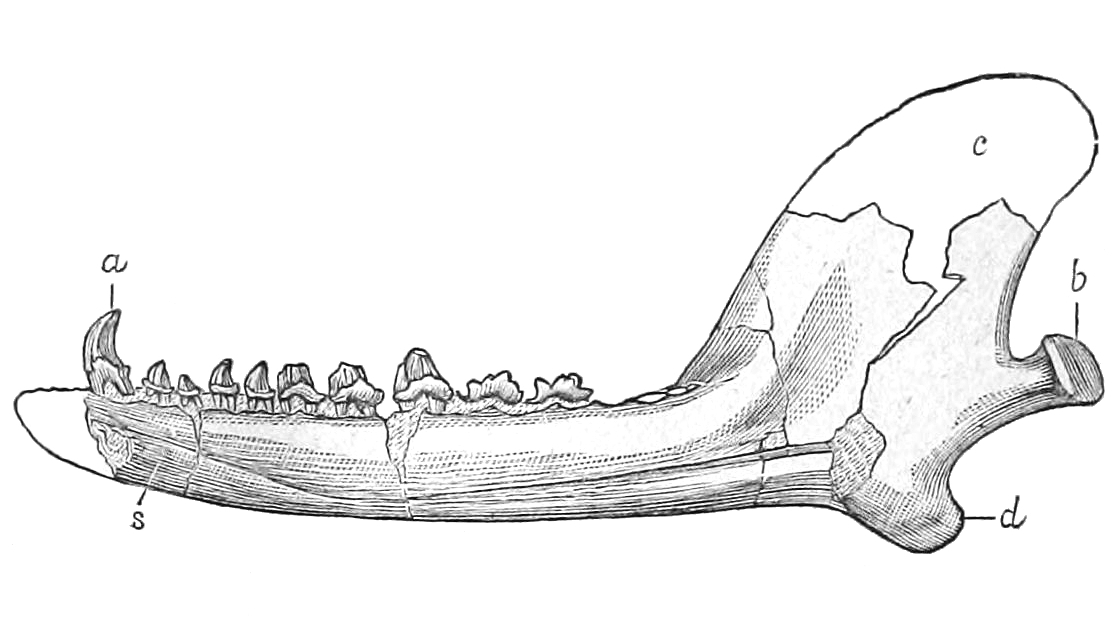
Docodon striatus

Docodon was the first docodontan cynodont found and named, and later gave its name to the family Docodontidae as well as the order Docodonta. Docodonts had more complex shaped teeth than other early non-mammalian mammaliaforms, with piercing and crushing surfaces that would have allowed members of this family to eat a wider range of food types. These complex teeth are more similar to those of later mammal groups, but evolved independently of them.

Analysis of the enamel microstructure of D. victor has shown that the species possessed prismatic enamel.

Unlike many of its coexisting mammal relatives from the Mesozoic, Docodon is known from a large number of teeth and jaws of differing growth stages. This has made it possible to study the growth of this docodontan, and has revealed how docodont jaws change from juvenile stages to adulthood.

== Discovery ==
Docodon was discovered by William Harlow Reed and named by Othniel Charles Marsh in 1880. Like many other early small mammaliaforms, it is known mainly from fossilized teeth and jaws, as these are the hardest parts of the body and survive more easily in the fossil record. Docodon fossils are found most commonly in the Black Hills region of South Dakota.

Its height is estimated at 10 centimeters with an approximate weight of 30 grams, making it one of the larger mammaliaforms known from the Morrison Formation.

== Species ==
A number of species have been erected, but most are now considered to represent D. victor, with differences being attributed to differing ages of the individuals represented. However, D. apoxys is still considered a separate species from D. victor due to differing numbers of tooth roots.

- Docodon victor
- Docodon apoxys
- Docodon hercynicus

== See also ==
- Morrison Formation
  - Mammaliaforms of the Morrison Formation
