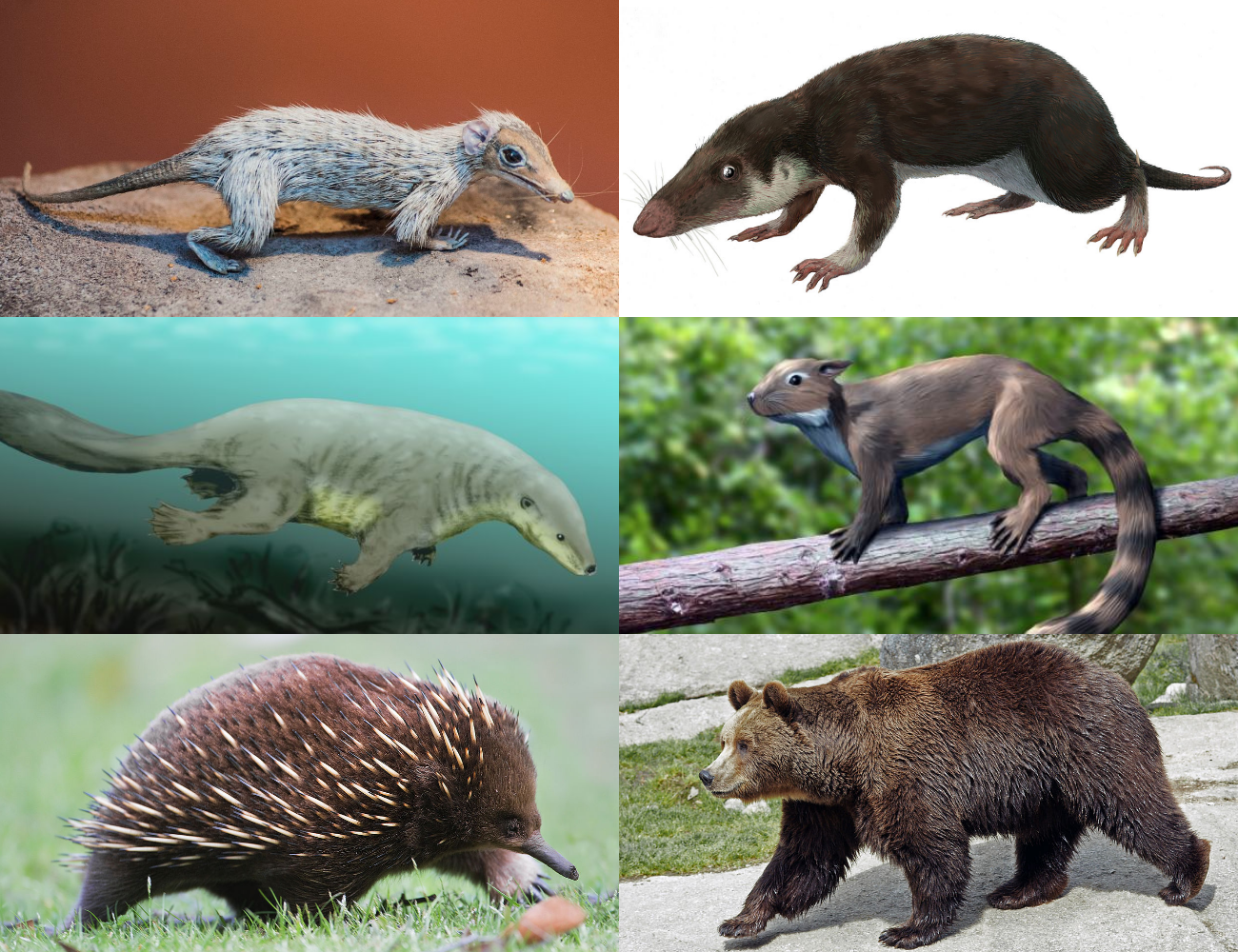
- Top: Megazostrodon rudnerae, Morganucodon watsoni (Morganucodonta); Middle: Castorocauda lutrasimilis (Docodonta), Shenshou lui (Haramiyida); Bottom: Tachyglossus aculeatus (Monotremata), Ursus arctos (Theria).
- Skull of Morganucodon

Scientific classification
- Kingdom: Animalia
- Phylum: Chordata
- Clade: Synapsida
- Clade: Therapsida
- Clade: Cynodontia
- Clade: Prozostrodontia
- Clade: Mammaliamorpha
- Clade: Mammaliaformes; Rowe, 1988

Subgroups
- †Bocaconodon; †Delsatia; †Gondtherium; †Hadrocodium; †Woutersia; †Morganucodonta; †Kuehneotheriidae; †Docodonta; †Allotheria (often placed as crown mammals); †Haramiyida (possibly crown mammals); †Shuotheriidae; Mammalia (Crown group); †Shuotheriidae?; †Australosphenida; Monotremata; Theriimorpha

= Mammaliaformes =

Mammaliaformes Temporal range: Late Triassic (Earliest Norian) – Present, 227–0 Ma

Clade of mammals and extinct relatives

Mammaliaformes ("mammal-shaped animals") is a clade of synapsid tetrapods that includes the crown group mammals and their closest extinct relatives; the group radiated from earlier probainognathian cynodonts during the Late Triassic. It is defined as the clade originating from the most recent common ancestor of Morganucodonta and the crown group mammals; the latter is the clade originating with the most recent common ancestor of extant Monotremata, Marsupialia and Placentalia. Besides Morganucodonta and the crown group mammals, Mammaliaformes also includes Docodonta and Hadrocodium.

Mammaliaformes is a term of phylogenetic nomenclature. In contrast, the assignment of organisms to class Mammalia has traditionally been founded on traits and, on this basis, Mammalia is slightly more inclusive than Mammaliaformes. In particular, trait-based taxonomy generally includes Adelobasileus and Sinoconodon in Mammalia, though they fall outside the Mammaliaformes definition. These genera are included in the broader clade Mammaliamorpha, defined phylogenetically as the clade originating with the last common ancestor of Tritylodontidae and the crown group mammals. This wider group includes some families that trait-based taxonomy does not include in Mammalia, in particular Tritylodontidae and Brasilodontidae.

Animals in the clade Mammaliaformes are often called mammaliaforms, without the e. Sometimes, the spelling mammaliforms is used. The origin of crown-group mammals extends back to the Jurassic, with extensive findings in the Late Jurassic outcrops of Portugal and China. The earliest confirmed specimens of fur are found in them, demonstrating that the ancestors of mammals had already developed fur.

== Description ==
Early mammaliaforms were generally shrew-like in appearance and size, and most of their distinguishing characteristics were internal. In particular, the structure of the mammaliaform (and mammal) jaw and the arrangement of teeth are nearly unique. Instead of having many teeth that are frequently replaced, mammals have one set of baby teeth and later one set of adult teeth that fit together precisely. This is thought to aid in the grinding of food to make it quicker to digest. Endothermic animals require more calories than those that are ectothermic, so speeding up the pace of digestion is a necessity. The drawback to the fixed dentition is that worn teeth cannot be replaced, as was possible for the reptiliomorph ancestors of mammaliaforms. To compensate, mammals developed prismatic enamel, characterized by crystallite discontinuities that helped spread out the force of the bite.

Lactation, along with other characteristically mammalian features, is also thought to characterize the Mammaliaformes, but these traits are difficult to study in the fossil record. Evidence of lactation is present in morganucodontans, via tooth replacement patterns. Combined with the more basal tritylodontids that also display evidence of lactation, this seems to imply that milk is an ancestral characteristic in this group. However, the fairly derived Sinoconodon appears to have uniquely discarded milk altogether. Prior to hatching, the milk glands would provide moisture to the leathery eggs, a situation still found in monotremes.

The early mammaliaforms did have a harderian gland. In modern mammals, this is used for cleaning the fur, indicating that they, contrary to their cynodont ancestors, had a furry covering. An insulative covering is necessary to keep a homeothermic animal warm if it is very small, less than 5 cm (1.97 in) long; the 3.2 cm (1.35 in) Hadrocodium must have had fur, therefore, but the 10 cm (3.94 in) Morganucodon might not have needed it. The docodont Castorocauda, further removed from crown group mammals than Hadrocodium, had two layers of fur, guard hairs and underfur, as do mammals today.

It is possible that early mammaliaforms had vibrissae; Tritheledontidae, a group of cynodonts, probably had whiskers. A common ancestor of all therian mammals did so. Indeed, some humans even still develop vestigial vibrissal muscles in the upper lip. Thus, it is possible that the development of the whisker sensory system played an important role in mammalian development, more generally.

Like monotremes today, the legs of early mammaliaforms were somewhat sprawling, giving a rather "reptilian" type of gait. However, there was a general tendency to have more erect forelimbs, forms like eutriconodonts even having a fundamentally modern forelimb anatomy while the hindlimbs remained "primitive"; this tendency is in some effect still seen in modern therian mammals, which often have more sprawling hindlimbs. In some forms, the hind feet likely bore a spur similar to those found in the platypus and echidnas. Such a spur would have been connected to a venom gland for protection or mating competition.

Hadrocodium lacks the multiple bones in its lower jaw seen in reptiles. These are still retained, however, in earlier mammaliaforms.

Mammaliaforms lack the proatlas bones in the neck seen in other synapsids.

With the possible exception of Megazostrodon and Erythrotherium (as well as placental mammals), all mammaliforms possess epipubic bones, a possibly synapomorphy with tritylodontids, which also have them. These pelvic bones strengthen the torso and support abdominal and hindlimb musculature. They, however, prevent the expansion of the abdomen, and so force species that possess them to either give birth to larval young (as in modern marsupials), or produce minuscule eggs that hatch into larval young (as in modern monotremes). Most mammaliforms, therefore, probably had the same constraints, and some species could have borne pouches.

== Phylogeny ==
The cladogram below follows the analysis of Luo and colleagues in 2015.

- Mammaliamorpha
  - Tritylodontidae
  - - Pachygenelus
    - Mammaliaformes
      - Adelobasileus
      - Sinoconodon
      - - - Morganucodonta
            - Megazostrodon
            - Morganucodon
        - - - Docodonta
              - Haldanodon
              - Castorocauda
          - - - Haramiyida
                - - Thomasia
                  - Haramiyavia
                - - Megaconus
                  - - Shenshou
                    - - - Eleutherodon
                        - Sineleutherus
                      - - Arboroharamiya
                        - Xianshou
            - Mammalia
              - Yinotheria
                - Shuotheriidae
                - Australosphenida
                  Monotremata
              - Theriiformes
                - Fruitafossor
                - - Eutriconodonta
                  - - Tinodon
                    - - Allotheria
                        Multituberculata
                    - - Trechnotheria
                        expanded below

Expanded from above

- Trechnotheria
  - Spalacotheriida
  - - Henkelotherium
    - Cladotheria
      - Dryolestes
      - - Amphitherium
        - Zatheria
          - Peramus
          - Vincelestes
          - Nanolestes
          - - Kielantherium
            - - Aegialodon
              - Theria
                - Metatheria
                  Marsupialia
                - Eutheria
                  Placentalia

Cladogram based on Rougier et al. (1996) with Tikitherium included following Luo and Martin (2007). However, Tikitherium is later considered as misidentification of Neogene shrew.

- Mammaliamorpha
  - Tritylodontidae
  - - Adelobasileus
    - - Sinoconodon
      - Mammaliaformes
        - - Morganucodontidae
            Morganucodon
        - - - Tikitherium
            - Docodonta
              - - Haldanodon
                - Castorocauda
          - Crown-group Mammalia
            - Monotremata
              - Ornithorhychus (platypus)
              - Tachyglossidae (echidna)
            - Theriiformes
              - Triconodonts, multituberculates,
                marsupials, and placentals

== See also ==
- Evolution of mammals
- Permian–Triassic extinction event
- Therapsida
- Vertebrate paleontology
