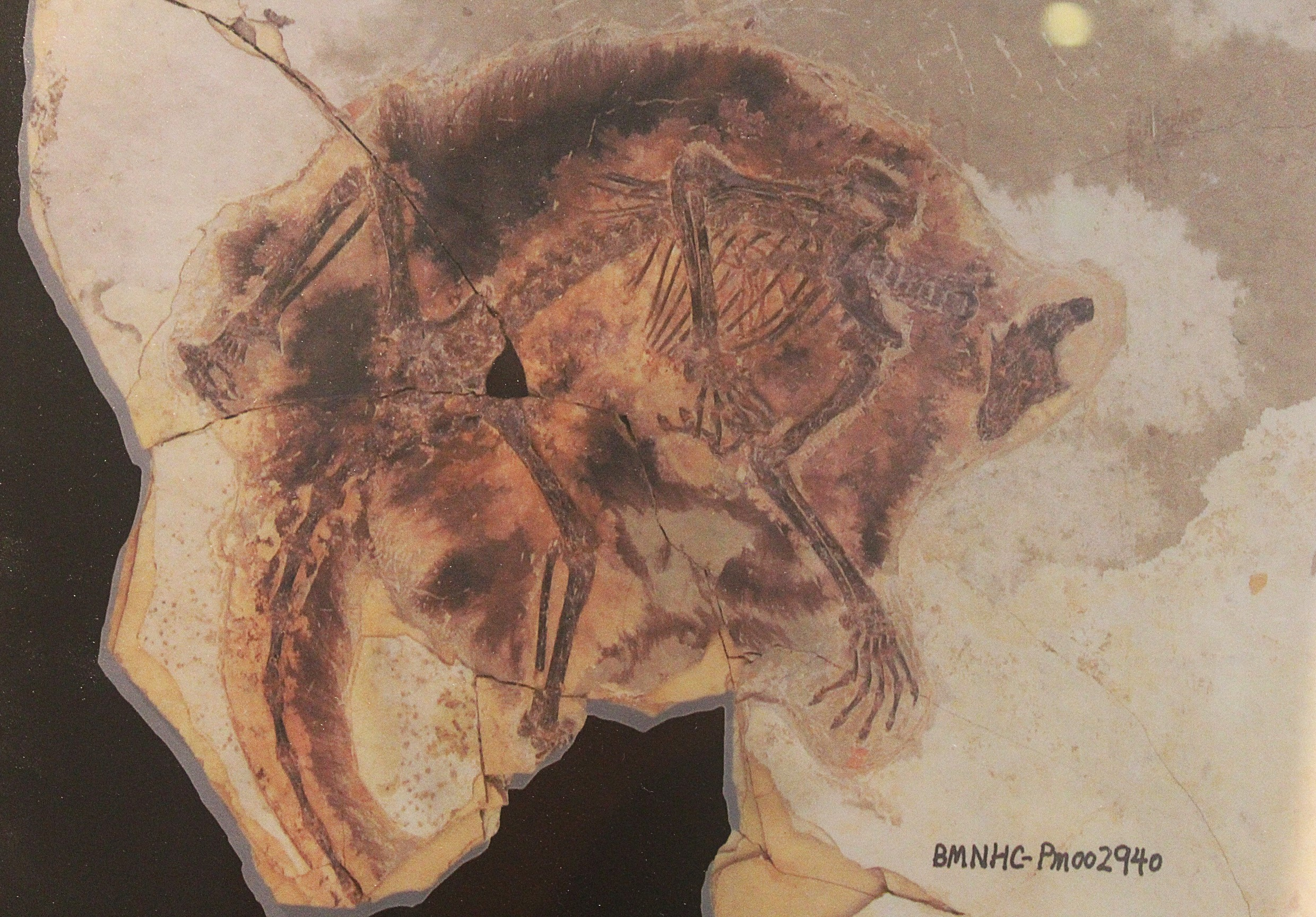
- Skeleton of Maiopatagium a gliding squirrel-like euharamiyidan from the Middle Jurassic of China
- Skull of Xianshou

Scientific classification
- Kingdom: Animalia
- Phylum: Chordata
- Clade: Synapsida
- Clade: Therapsida
- Clade: Cynodontia
- Clade: Mammaliaformes
- Order: †Haramiyida
- Clade: †Euharamiyida; Bi et al. 2014

= Euharamiyida =

Euharamiyida Temporal range: Middle Jurassic–Early Cretaceous

Extinct clade of mammaliaforms

Euharamiyida also known as Eleutherodontida, is clade of early mammals or mammal-like cynodonts from the Middle Jurassic to Early Cretaceous of Eurasia and possibly North America. The group is sometimes considered a sister group to Multituberculata, or part of an earlier divergence within the synapsid line. It is disputed whether or not they are related to the haramiyids from the Late Triassic, such as Haramiyavia. The morphology of their teeth indicates that they were herbivorous or omnivorous. Some members of the group are known to be arboreal, including gliding forms similar to modern flying squirrels or colugos.

== Evolution ==
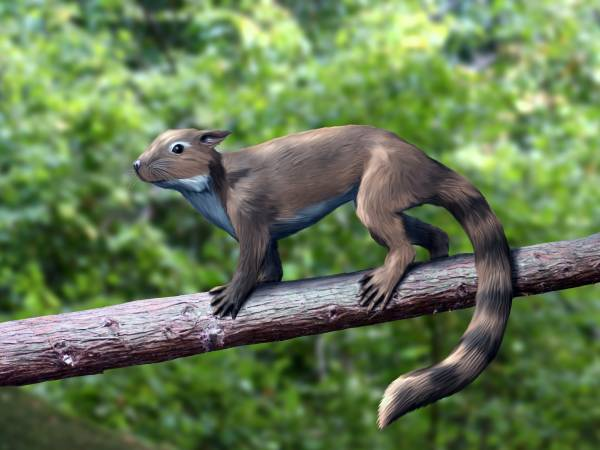
Life restoration of Shenshou, an extinct squirrel-like euharamiyidan from the Middle Jurassic of China

The position of euharamiyidans is contested. They are either considered crown group mammals as members of Allotheria, related to multituberculates, or stem-group mammals within Mammaliaformes. The position is often dependent on the relationships of euharamiyids to the Late Triassic haramiyids such as Haramiyavia and Thomasia. In some studies, the two groups are recovered as unrelated.

== Phylogeny ==
Huttenlocker et al. 2018

- Euharamiyida (=Eleutherodontida)
  - Megaconus
  - - - Cifelliodon
      - Hahnodon
      - Gondwanatheria
        Vintana
    - Eleutherodontidae
      - Maiopatagium
      - - Shenshou
        - - Millsodon
          - - - Eleutherodon
              - Sineleutherus
            - - Xianshou
              - - Arboroharamiya
                - Vilevolodon

Mao et al. 2022

- Euharamiyida
  - Maiopatagium furculiferum
  - - Maiopatagium sibiricum
    - - Cryoharamiya
      - - Sharypovia
        - - Shenshouidae
            - Qishou
            - Shenshou
          - - Allostaffia
            - - Sineleutherus
              - - - Butlerodon
                  - Woodeatonia
                - - Kermackodontidae
                    Kermackodon
                  - Arboroharamiyidae
                    - Xianshou
                    - - Arboroharamiya allinhopsoni
                      - Arboroharamiya jenkinsi
                      - Vilevolodon

== Taxa ==
The following taxonomy follows Mao et al. (2022) unless otherwise cited.

- Cryoharamiya
- Maiopatagium
- Millsodon
- Sineleutherus
- Woodeatonia
- ?Allostaffia
- ?Hahnodontidae Sigogneau-Russell, 1991
- ?Megaconus
- ?Gondwanatheria
- Arboroharamiyidae Zheng et al., 2013
  - Arboroharamiya
  - Mirusodens
  - Vilevolodon
  - Xianshou
- Kermackodontidae Butler and Hooker, 2005 (="Eleutherodontidae" Kermack et al., 1998) (considered by other studies to be multituberculates)
  - Kermackodon
  - Butlerodon
- Shenshouidae Mao and Meng, 2019
  - Qishou
  - Sharypovoia
  - Shenshou
