= Xianshou =

Xianshou Temporal range: 160 Ma Oxfordian
- Skull diagram of X. linglong

Scientific classification
- Domain: Eukaryota
- Kingdom: Animalia
- Phylum: Chordata
- Clade: Synapsida
- Clade: Therapsida
- Clade: Cynodontia
- Clade: Mammaliaformes
- Order: †Haramiyida
- Family: †Eleutherodontidae
- Genus: †Xianshou; Wang, Meng, Bi, Guan and Sheng, 2014

Species
- X. linglong Wang et al., 2014; X. songae Meng, et al., 2014

Extinct genus of mammaliaforms

Xianshou is a genus of gliding haramiyidan synapsid known from the Oxfordian stage of the Jurassic period, approximately 160 million years ago. Two species, X. linglong and X. songae, are known from fossils of the Tiaojishan Formation in the Liaoning province of China.

== Etymology ==
The genus name is derived from Chinese xiān (仙), meaning "immortal" or "celestial being", and shòu (獸), meaning "creature" or "beast". The specific name linglong is derived from both the Chinese word for "exquisite" (玲瓏), and from the name of the town Linglongta, where the holotype was discovered. X. songae is named for the collector of the specimen, Rufeng Song.

== Description ==
X. linglong is believed to have weighed 83 grams (2.9 oz) in life. It can be distinguished from X. songae and Shenshou by the sharper cusps and ridges of its upper molars, and by larger size. X. songae is estimated to have weighed around 40 grams (1.4 oz).

More recent study of Xianshou suggests that, like the closely related Maiopatagium and Vilevolodon, it may have had a patagium and the ability to glide. No patagium is preserved in Xianshou fossils, but the morphology of the limbs and pes is most similar to those of extant gliding mammals.

== Phylogeny ==
The following phylogenetic analysis was recovered by the description of Xianshou.

- Euharamiyida
  - Shenshou
  - - Arboroharamiya
    - - Eleutherodon
      - - Sineleutherus
        - Xianshou
          - Xianshou linglong
          - Xianshou songae
