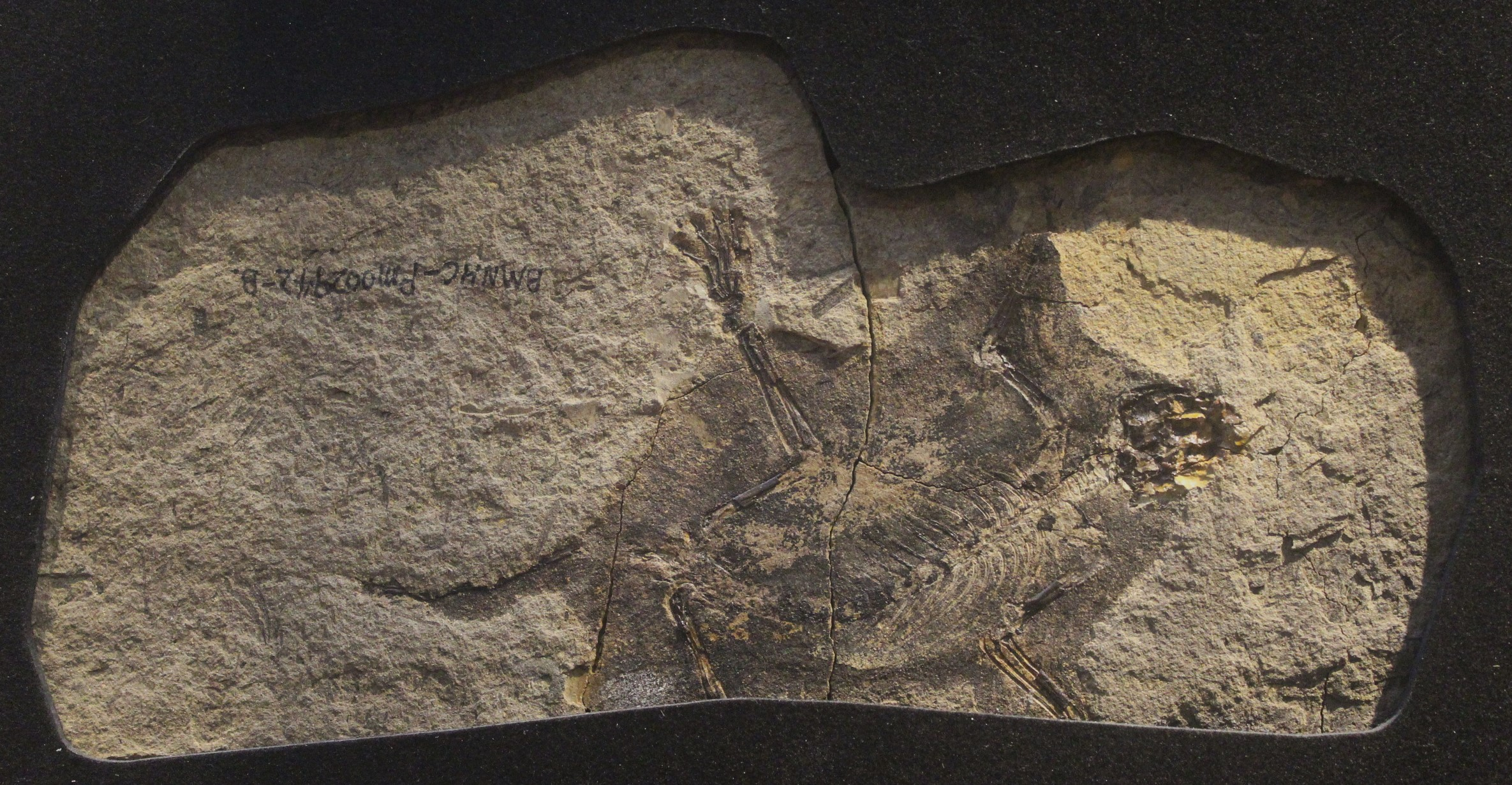
- Fossil specimen of V. diplomylos, National Natural History Museum of China

Scientific classification
- Kingdom: Animalia
- Phylum: Chordata
- Clade: Synapsida
- Clade: Therapsida
- Clade: Cynodontia
- Clade: Mammaliaformes
- Order: †Haramiyida
- Family: †Eleutherodontidae
- Genus: †Vilevolodon; Luo et al., 2017

Type species
- Vilevolodon diplomylos Luo et al., 2017

= Vilevolodon =

Vilevolodon Temporal range: Oxfordian, 161–160 Ma

Extinct genus of mammaliaforms

Vilevolodon is an extinct, monotypic genus of volant, arboreal euharamiyids from the Oxfordian age of the Late Jurassic of China. The type species is Vilevolodon diplomylos. The genus name Vilevolodon references its gliding capabilities, Vilevol (Latin for "glider"), while don (Greek for "tooth") is a common suffix for mammalian taxon titles. The species name diplomylos refers to the dual mortar-and-pestle occlusion of upper and lower molars observed in the holotype; diplo (Greek for "double"), mylos (Greek for "grinding").

Vilevolodon is known from the Tiaojishan Formation in Qinglong County, China. Due to its unique combination of characters, Vilevolodon provides additional evidence to an increasingly complex scope of mammalian morphology and niche inhabitation. As the volant herbivorous lifestyle is previously only known from therian gliders, Vilevolodon stands as evidence of locomotor convergence, as well as mammaliaform evolutionary experimentation during the Jurassic. Along with Maiopatagium, Vilevolodon represents the most primitive known gliders in mammalian evolution, appearing approximately 100 million years before the earliest known therian gliders. Based on the melanosomes preserved in its fur, Vilevolodon likely had a uniformly dark-brown coloration, similar to that of other early mammaliaforms including Arboroharamiya and Megaconus.

== History and Discovery ==
Vilevolodon diplomylos was described by Luo et al in 2017 concurrently with another euharamiyid, Maiopatagium furculiferum. Descriptions were carried out based on a skull with preserved teeth in occlusion and a mandibular inner ear, and a fairly complete post-cranial skeleton with carbonized residue of a patagial skin membrane, which has been interpreted as a gliding mechanism. The holotype is represented by a slab and counter-slab with fossil elements preserved across both samples. The holotype was found at the Nanshimen site of the Tiaojishan Formation in Quinglong County, Hebei Province, China, and is currently housed at the Beijing Museum of Natural History.

== Paleobiology ==
=== Feeding ecology ===
Based on dental morphological characteristics, Vilevolodon is inferred have had an herbivorous diet, likely consisting largely of seeds and soft plant tissues. Cusp likeness to sciurid rodents, which have a diet of nuts, seeds and fruits, and supplemented by insects, suggests some potential for omnivory. Luo posits that Vilevolodon was not a folivore however, as the teeth lack strong crests which are characteristic of folivorous taxa, including modern marsupial gliders. All extant mammalian gliders are primarily herbivorous, thus an herbivorous dietary inference for Vilevolodon is consistent with modern, analogous gliders. Overall, the distinctive teeth of Vilevolodon expand the known dental morphology of mammaliaforms, especially when compared to Triassic haramiyids of the same clade, whose teeth are often much less transformed with reduced basins, and lie in straight, organized rows within the jaw.

=== Locomotion ===
Vilevolodon is interpreted as volant and capable of gliding. Meng et al cited the relative proportions of limb bones, and the acromion-clavicle joint which allowed for significant shoulder mobility as supportive of a stance required for gliding locomotion. The acromion-clavicle joint structure is persistent throughout eleutherodonts and represents an adaptation for volant locomotion running convergent to the increased mobility of the sternum-clavicle joint observed across therian gliders. The shortened shape of the astragalus and calcaneus resemble those of a modern bat, and the proximal pedal phalanx has a pronounced groove used for tendon attachment which is observed in mammals with enhanced grasping capabilities. Elongated necessary for roosting and hanging behavior. When considered together, the gliding capabilities and modified feet with climbing and roosting specializations suggest an arboreal lifestyle for Vilevolodon. This is consistent with other members of the clade Eleutherodontia, of which the taxa, like Maiopatagium, were a majority arboreal.

== Description ==
=== Patagium ===
Preserved alongside skeletal elements is what Luo et al has interpreted as a patagium, or a membranous structure used in gliding or flight assistance. Propatagium, plagiopatagium and uropatagium sub-structures have been identified as well. Morphometric analyses carried out contiguously with another gliding Haramiyid, Maiopatagium furculiferum, from the same locality are consistent with the gliding adaptations of extant mammals and other fossil taxa. The pelage of Vilevolodon is preserved as a mat of carbonized fur and long guard hairs which was compressed upon patagial membranes. Among therian gliders, this patagium is most comparatively similar to the gliding sciurid rodents based upon similar proportions of propatagium, plagiopatagium, and uropatagium structures. This structure, and other gliding structures seen among eleutherodonts, differs from modern anomalurids in that the plagiopatagium extends to reach the ankle and wrist, and they also differ from modern rodent gliders and the marsupial glider, Petauroides volans, in that they lack a styliform structure from the wrist or ulnar olecranon. Vilevolodon also exhibits strongly developed uropatagia and propatagia, where these structures in marsupial gliders are much less prominent. Analysis on the fur impressions of Vilevolodon revealed high concentration of copper associated with eumelanin, indicative of uniformly dark-brown coloration with no evidence of color patterns, which was also the case in other early mammaliaforms from China: Arboroharamiya, Megaconus, indeterminate docodonts (SDUST-V0006 and SDUST-V0007) and indeterminate eutherian (SDUST-V0008).

=== Teeth ===
The dental morphology of Vilevolodon is characterized by a dual "mortar-and-pestle" occlusion of molars in which the tallest distal cusp of the upper molar occludes into the deepest distal basin of the opposite, lower molar. The tallest mesial cusp of the lower molar occludes into the mesial basin of the opposite upper molar, simultaneously. Analysis using STL models and tomography scans suggest that this occlusal pattern allows for a complex mechanism of dual crushing and grinding capabilities. A similar occlusal pattern is seen in other Haramiyids, Arboroharamiya and Xianshou. CT scans of Vilevolodon reveal no replacement premolars within the mandible, and that the molars are fully erupted and occluded with closed root tips. However, the upper and lower incisors are captured in mid-replacement. This pattern of tooth replacement, with off-set or potentially heterochronical replacement and eruption of incisors as compared to the molars and premolars is unique in mammaliaforms. Luo posits that Vilevolodon either had an unusually accelerated completion of molar eruptions, or the incisor replacement captured in the holotype represents a paedomorphic adult feature.

=== Middle ear ===
Like other euharamiyidans. the ear bones of Vilevolodon had not achieved full separation from the mandible. As the transition of the middle ear away from the dentary via the modification of the quadrate and articular bones into and incus and malleus respectively is a hallmark for mammalian recognition, the preservation of an ear structure in the Vilevolodon holotype is not only crucial to its placement as a euharamiyidan, but has important phylogenetic implications as well. The holotype features a malleus connected anterior to Meckels's cartilage, and the ectotympanic features an anterior limb and a straight reflected lamina. The anterior ectotympanic limb is nestled in a post-dentary trough on the internal edge of the mandible. This groove occupies a similar location in other mammaliaforms, however, it is narrower and much shorter in Vilevolodon, and does not extend posteriorly to the dentary condyle. Based upon CT scans and proximity of preservation, the Meckel's cartilage and the ectotympanic contact each other loosely. Luo et al reconstructed these two elements as contiguous, in a similar fashion to cynodonts and other mammaliaforms. While Morganucodon and other docodontans have modern-mammal-like diphyodont (two sets of teeth) replacement which is completed during early ontogeny. Luo et al posit that this suggests that the diphyodont tooth replacement had heterochronical variation, and is likely a homoplasy in early mammaliaforms.

== Classification ==
Vilevolodon belongs to clade Euharamiyida, and the sub-group Eleutherodontia. Within Eleutherodontia, Vilevolodon lies as a sister taxon to Maiopatagium, Megaconus, Shenshou, Xianshou, Sineleutherus, and Arboroharamiya. However, the position of Euharamiyida with respect to the greater clades of Mammaliaformes and Mammalia has been a subject of debate for some time. Current studies have demonstrated that Euharamiyidans are more basal mammaliaformes as based upon a variety of characteristics, including dentition and inferred diet, and incomplete transformation of mandibular elements into the mammalian middle ear bones.

The largest debate surrounds the position of Euharamiyida as being within crown-group mammals or as a stem-group mammaliaform. Although isolated Haramiyid teeth are among the earliest known evidence of fossil mammals, these elements were difficult to diagnose without orientation and position within the jaw, and thus were originally used to classify Haramiyids as sister to the mammalian crown-group, multituberculata, on the basis of superficial similarity between molars. Haramiyid fossil samples representing craniodental and postcranial elements have been uncovered and described since its original diagnosis, and more recent studies have worked to clarify the phylogeny. A more recent variant upon the hypothesis of Haramiyids, and by extension, Euharamiyids, being members of mammalia by Krause et al has postulated a close taxonomic relationship to the gondwanatherian-multituberculate clade. Based on the craniodental and postcranial similarities between several Euharamiyida and taxa of the clade multituberculata, including a molar pattern with two rows and bilateral occlusion, suggests the placement of Euharamiyida as sister to multituberculates. In contrast, the occlusal movement reconstructed from the Haramiyid, Haramiyavia, differs from that of multituberculate mammals, and their subsequent phylogenetic analysis excludes Haramiyids from Mammalia.

Order †Haramiyida

- †Kirtlingtonia catenata Butler & Hooker 2005 [tooth-taxa]
- Family †Haramiyaviidae Butler 2000
  - †Haramiyavia clemmenseni Jenkins et al. 1997
- Family †Eleutherodontidae Kermack et al. 1998 [Arboroharamiyidae Zheng et al. 2013; Euharamiyida Bi et al. 2014; Eleutherodontida Kermack et al. 1998]
  - †Maiopatagium Luo et al. 2017
    - †Maiopatagium furculiferum Luo et al. 2017
  - †Megaconus mammaliaformis Zhou et al. 2013
  - †Shenshou lui Bi et al. 2014
  - †Arboroharamiya jenkinsi Zheng et al. 2013
  - †Eleutherodon oxfordensis Kermack et al. 1998
  - †Xianshou Bi et al. 2014
    - †X. linglong Bi et al. 2014
    - †X. songae Bi et al. 2014
  - †Sineleutherus Martin, Averianov & Pfretzschner 2010
    - †S. uyguricus Martin, Averianov & Pfretzschner 2010
    - †S. issedonicus Averianov, Lopatin & Krasnolutskii 2011
  - †Vilevolodon Zhe-Xi Luo, 2017
    - †Vilevolodon diplomylosZhe-Xi Luo, 2017

== Stratigraphy ==
Vilevolodon is known from the Tiaojishan Formation and is placed within the Oxfordian age of the Late Jurassic, estimated to be 161 – 160 million years old, as based upon stratigraphic correlation to a regional index fossil, Qaidamestheria, a genus of Jurassic Clam Shrimp. The Tiaojishan Formation has also yielded holotypes of other euharamiyids, including Shenshou and Maiopatagium. The geology of the Tiaojishan Formation is characterized by high levels of pyroclastic and volcanic rock, including high levels andesitic breccias, tuffs, and various other brecciated lavas.

== Paleoenvironment ==
Flora sampled from the Tiaojishan Formation representing the Middle to Late Jurassic indicate a subtropical to temperate environment with warm and humid climates throughout prehistoric Liaoning and Hebei provinces. Analysis of growth rings in sampled conifer wood supports a consistent and distinct seasonal climate during this interval. These conditions are consistent with the inferred lifestyle and ecological requirements of Vilevolodon and other arboreal, gliding euharamiyids. As organisms suited for arboreal lifestyles, it is likely that the extinction of Vilevolodon and other euharamiyidans was caused by the turnover in forest flora and transition away from gymnosperm-dominant ecosystems associated with the Jurassic-Cretaceous transition.
