= Sineleutherus =

Sineleutherus Temporal range: Jurassic, Bathonian–Oxfordian

Scientific classification
- Kingdom: Animalia
- Phylum: Chordata
- Clade: Synapsida
- Clade: Therapsida
- Clade: Cynodontia
- Clade: Mammaliaformes
- Order: †Haramiyida
- Family: †Eleutherodontidae
- Genus: †Sineleutherus; Martin, Averianov & Pfretzschner, 2010

Species
- S. uyguricus Martin, Averianov & Pfretzschner, 2010 (type); S. issedonicus Averianov, Lopatin & Krasnolutskii, 2011

Extinct genus of mammaliaforms

Sineleutherus is an extinct genus of euharamiyids which existed in Asia during the Jurassic period. The type species is Sineleutherus uyguricus, which was described by Thomas Martin, Alexander O. Averianov and Hans-Ulrich Pfretzschner in 2010; it lived in what is now China during the late Jurassic (Oxfordian age) Qigu Formation. A second species, Sineleutherus issedonicus, was described by A. O. Averianov, A. V. Lopatin and S. A. Krasnolutskii in 2011. It lived in what is now Sharypovsky District (Krasnoyarsk Krai, Russia) during the middle Jurassic (Bathonian age); its fossils were collected from the upper part of the Itat Formation. However, this is now believed to represent several euharamiyid taxa not closely related to Sineleutherus.

- Euharamiyida
  - Shenshou
  - - Arboroharamiya
    - - Eleutherodon
      - - Sineleutherus
        - Xianshou
          - X. linglong
          - X. songae

Mammalian tooth marks on dinosaur bones may belong to Sineleutherus, suggesting that some haramiyidans scavenged on dinosaur remains.
