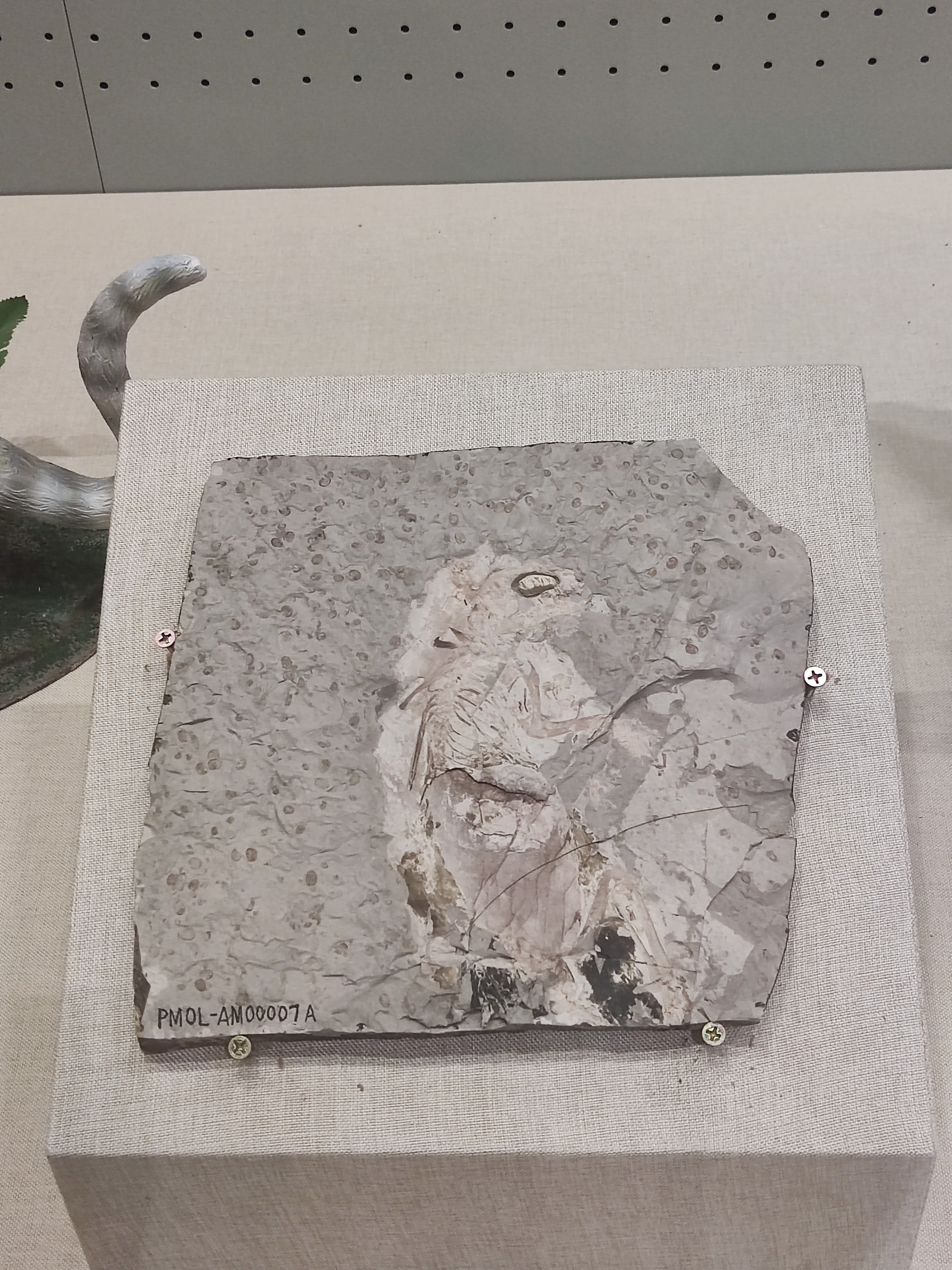
- Fossil in Liaoning Palaeontological Museum

Scientific classification
- Kingdom: Animalia
- Phylum: Chordata
- Class: Mammalia
- Subclass: †Allotheria
- Genus: †Megaconus; Zhou et al., 2013

Type species
- †Megaconus mammaliaformis Zhou et al., 2013

= Megaconus =

Megaconus Temporal range: Callovian ~165 Ma

Extinct genus of mammaliaforms

Megaconus is an extinct genus of allotherian mammal from the Middle Jurassic Tiaojishan Formation of Inner Mongolia, China. The type and only species, Megaconus mammaliaformis was first described in the journal Nature in 2013. Megaconus is thought to have been a herbivore that lived on the ground, having a similar posture to modern-day armadillos and rock hyraxes. Megaconus was in its initial description found to be member of a group called Haramiyida. A phylogenetic analysis published along its description suggested that haramiyidans originated before the appearance of true mammals, but in contrast, the later description of the haramiyidan Arboroharamiya in the same issue of Nature indicated that haramyidans were true mammals.

If haramiyidans are not mammals, Megaconus would be one of the most basal ("primitive") mammaliaforms to possess fur, and an indicator that fur evolved in the ancestors of mammals and not the mammals themselves. However, later studies cast doubt on the euharamiyidan interpretation, instead finding it to be a basal allotherian mammal. Based on the melanosomes preserved in its fur, Megaconus likely had a uniformly dark-brown coloration, similar to that of other early mammaliaforms including Arboroharamiya and Vilevolodon.

== Description ==
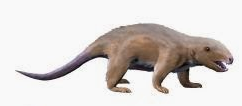
Life restoration

Megaconus is one of the few early mammaliaforms known from a complete skeleton. The skeleton includes both the jaw bones and the teeth, which are the most informative features because they allow for comparisons with other mammaliaforms known only from dental features. Megaconus has a dentition similar to those of rodents, with large incisors at the front of the jaws and broad molars in the back. One distinguishing feature of Megaconus is a pair of enlarged premolar teeth in the lower jaw. The teeth of Megaconus have many cusps, allowing them to interlock tightly when the jaws are closed. If Megaconus is a non-mammalian mammaliaform, it is one of the most basal mammaliaforms to possess such complex teeth.

The middle ear of Megaconus is more primitive than that of modern mammals. The three bones that make up the middle ear in modern mammals — the malleus, incus, and stapes — originated from the lower jaw in the ancestors of mammals. In Megaconus, these bones are still associated with the lower jaw, placed within a groove behind the dentary bone of the lower jaw.

Megaconus is estimated to have weighed about 250 grams (8.8 oz). It probably had an outwardly similar appearance to multituberculates, a major group of Mesozoic mammals. However, its body is longer than those of multituberculates and most other Mesozoic mammaliaforms, having more back vertebrae (24) than other early mammals. The transition between the thoracic and lumbar vertebrae is more gradual in Megaconus than it is in multituberculates, and the boundary between the anterior and posterior epaxial muscles (the muscles that cover the front part and the back part of the back, respectively) is positioned farther back.

Megaconus is inferred to have been ambulatory, meaning that it walked on the ground. Its claws are short, meaning that they were not suitable for digging, and only slightly curved, meaning that they were not suitable for climbing. The lack of an elongated calcaneus or "heel" on the ankle means that it could not have run fast. However, Megaconus differs from most ambulatory mammals in having a fused tibia and fibula in its lower leg, a feature that is normally seen in jumping or bipedal mammals. Among the only living ambulatory mammals to have a fused tibia and fibula are the armadillo and the aardvark.

Remains of fur are preserved on parts of the skeleton. The fur consists of dark guard hairs and a lighter layer of underfur. Fur seems to be absent on the underside of the abdomen. A keratinous spur on the rear leg may have been used to deliver poison, like the spur of the living platypus. Analysis on the fur impressions of Megaconus revealed high concentration of copper associated with eumelanin, indicative of uniformly dark-brown coloration with no evidence of color patterns, which was also the case in other early mammaliaforms from China: Arboroharamiya, Vilevolodon, indeterminate docodonts (SDUST-V0006 and SDUST-V0007) and indeterminate eutherian (SDUST-V0008).

== Discovery ==
The holotype skeleton of Megaconus was discovered in the Daohugou Beds of the Tiaojishan Formation in Inner Mongolia, China. The layer in which Megaconus was found is about 165 million years old (Ma). In addition to Megaconus, several other mammaliaforms are known from the Daohugou Beds: the non-mammalian mammaliaform Castorocauda, the basal mammals Volaticotherium and Pseudotribos, and the placental mammal Juramaia.

The genus name Megaconus means "large cusp", coming from the Latin mega ("large") and the Greek conus ("cusp"), in reference to the pair of large premolars in its lower jaw. The species name mammaliaformis references its ancestral mammalian features.

== Relationships ==
Megaconus is part of the clade Haramiyida, which is otherwise known almost exclusively from teeth. The relationships of haramiyidans to other early mammals is contested.

One idea is that haramiyidans are close relatives of Multituberculata, the most diverse group of Mesozoic mammals, and that both are part of the larger clade Allotheria. According to this evolutionary hypothesis (phylogeny), haramiyidans fall within the crown group Mammalia — the clade originating from the most recent common ancestor of living mammals. Within the crown group Mammalia, Haramiyida would be a basal offshoot of Boreosphenida, the clade including marsupials, eutherians (placental mammals), and all mammals more closely related to them than to monotremes (which are part of the clade Australosphenida).

A second hypothesis holds that haramiyidans originated before the appearance of crown group Mammalia as more basal members of the larger clade Mammaliaformes and that multituberculates are deeply nested within the crown group, splitting up Allotheria. This phylogeny was supported by the phylogenetic analysis that included Megaconus. Features of Megaconus that link it with basal mammaliaforms include a groove in the lower jaw holding the middle ear bones (in multituberculates and other true mammals, these bones are completely separated from the lower jaw) and a calcaneum or ankle bone that lacks an enlarged heel. Below is a cladogram modified from the analysis:

- Mammaliaformes
  - Adelobasileus
  - Sinoconodon
  - - - Morganucodon
      - Megazostrodon
    - - Haramiyida
        - - Thomasia
          - Haramiyavia
        - Eleutherodontida
          - Megaconus
          - - Eleutherodon
            - Sineleutherus
      - - Castorocauda
        - Haldanodon
      - Hadrocodium
      - Crown group Mammalia
        - Australosphenida (monotremes and extinct relatives)
        - Boreosphenida
          - Eutriconodonta
          - - Multituberculata
            - - Spalacotheroidea
              - Cladotheria (marsupials, placental mammals, and extinct relatives)

A 2022 study found it to be a basal allotherian instead, due to lacking apomorphies characteristic of euharamiyidans. Furthermore, a 2020 study found it to fall outside Mammaliaformes entirely, as the sister taxon to Tritylodontidae.
