= Cryoharamiya =

Cryoharamiya Temporal range: Berriasian–Barremian

Scientific classification
- Kingdom: Animalia
- Phylum: Chordata
- Clade: Synapsida
- Clade: Therapsida
- Clade: Cynodontia
- Clade: Mammaliaformes
- Order: †Haramiyida
- Genus: †Cryoharamiya
- Species: †C. tarda

Binomial name
- †Cryoharamiya tarda Averianov et al., 2019

Extinct genus of euharamiyidan mammaliaform

Cryoharamiya is an extinct monotypic genus of euharamiyidan mammaliaform that lived in Russia during the Early Cretaceous epoch.

== Etymology ==
The generic name Cryoharamiya derives from the Greek word kryos, meaning cold, and the generic name Haramiya, a relative of Cryoharamiya. The specific epithet of the type species, Cryoharamiya tarda, means late.
