= Mirusodens =

Mirusodens Temporal range: Bathonian–Callovian

Scientific classification
- Kingdom: Animalia
- Phylum: Chordata
- Clade: Synapsida
- Clade: Therapsida
- Clade: Cynodontia
- Clade: Mammaliaformes
- Order: †Haramiyida
- Family: †Arboroharamiyidae
- Genus: †Mirusodens
- Species: †M. caii

Binomial name
- †Mirusodens caii Mao et al., 2023

Extinct genus of arboroharamiyid mammal

Mirusodens is an extinct monotypic genus of arboroharamiyid mammal that lived in what is now China during the Middle Jurassic epoch.

== Etymology ==
The generic name Mirusodens derives from the Latin words mirus and dens, meaning remarkable and tooth, respectively. The specific epithet of the type species, Mirusodens caii, refers to Hongtao Cai, the individual who collected the holotype specimen.
