= Millsodon =

Millsodon Temporal range: Middle Jurassic, 167.7–164.7 Ma

Scientific classification
- Kingdom: Animalia
- Phylum: Chordata
- Clade: Synapsida
- Clade: Therapsida
- Clade: Cynodontia
- Clade: Mammaliaformes
- Order: †Haramiyida
- Genus: †Millsodon; Butler & Hooker, 2005
- Species: †M. superstes

Binomial name
- †Millsodon superstes Butler & Hooker, 2005

Extinct genus of mammaliaforms

Millsodon is a member of the order Haramiyida, which lived during the Late Bathonian in Dorset and Oxfordshire. There are three sorts known, all with molariform teeth, of which BM(NH) M46645 is the holotype and BMNH M46183 is the paratype; an assigned specimen is BDUC J 3. The only species, M. superstes, was described by Percy M. Butler & Jerry J. Hooker in 2005. The genus is named after the late Professor John R. E. Mills, who contributed a lot to the interpretation of Mesozoic mammalian teeth and was one of the original authors of the paratype, with the Greek word οδους, οδοντος (tooth). The species designation, 'superstes', is Latin for 'survivor'. It is still unclear to which family Millsodon belongs.
