= Tiaojishan Formation =

Geological formation in China

- Stratigraphic range: Callovian-Kimmeridgian; ~165–153 Ma
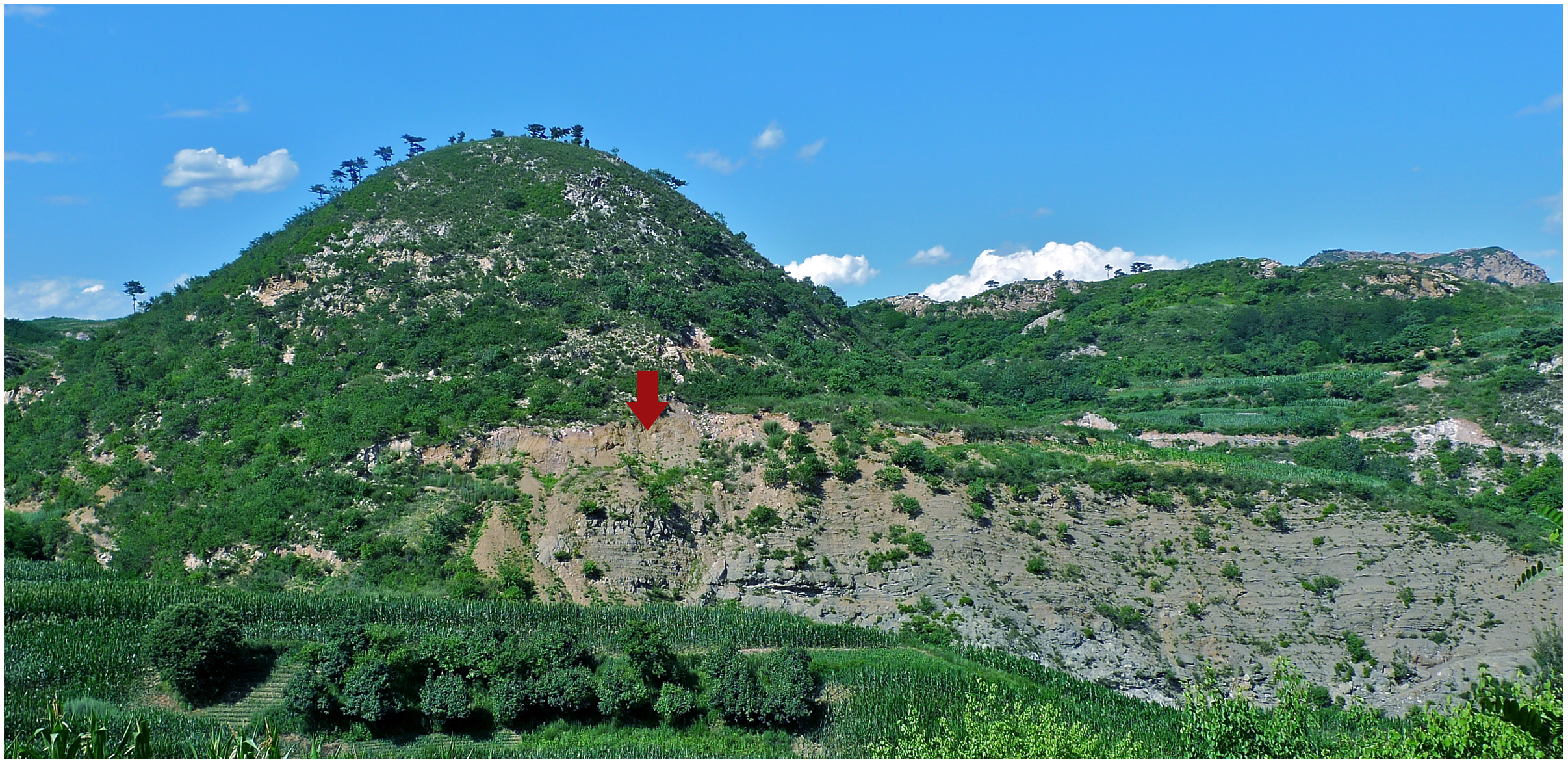
- Exposure of the Tiaojishan Formation at Nanshimenzi Village, Qinglong Manchu Autonomous County, Hebei Province, with red arrow pointing to fossiliferous beds
- Type: Geological formation
- Underlies: Tuchengzi Formation, Houcheng Formation
- Overlies: Haifanggou Formation
- Thickness: 2,420 m (7,940 ft)

Lithology
- Primary: Andesite
- Other: Sandstone, shale, tuff, coal

Location
- Coordinates: 41.3°N 119.2°E
- Approximate paleocoordinates: 43.0°N 123.1°E
- Region: Hebei, Inner Mongolia, & Liaoning
- Country: China
- Extent: Yanshan Belt
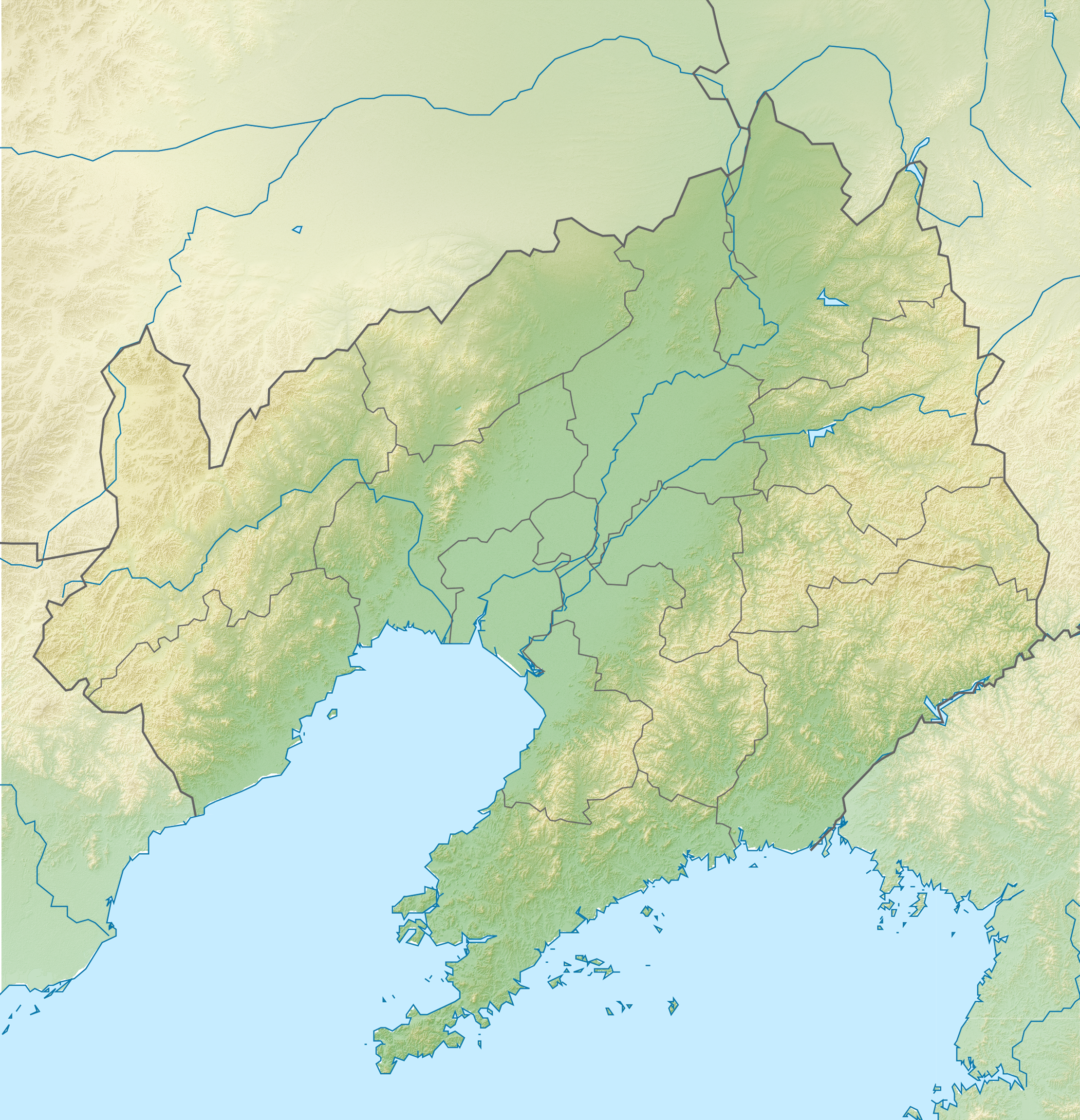
- Tiaojishan Formation (China) Tiaojishan Formation (Liaoning)

The Tiaojishan Formation is a geological formation in Hebei and Liaoning, People's Republic of China, dating to the middle-late Jurassic period (Callovian-Kimmeridgian stages). It is known for its exceptionally preserved fossils, including those of plants, insects and vertebrates. It is made up mainly of pyroclastic rock interspersed with basic volcanic and sedimentary rocks. Previously, the Tiaojishan Formation was grouped together with the underlying Haifanggou Formation (also known as the Jiulongshan Formation) as a single "Lanqi Formation." The Tiaojishan Formation forms a key part of the Yanliao Biota assemblage, alongside the Haifanggou Formation.

== Age ==
Using Argon–argon dating, Wang and colleagues in 2005 dated part of the Tiaojishan Formation to about 160 million years ago, the beginning of the Oxfordian stage, the first stage of the Upper Jurassic epoch. In 2006, a study by Liu and colleagues used U-Pb zircon dating to conclude that the Tiaojishan Formation correlates with the Daohugou Beds, and the complete chronological range of this shared biota dates to between 168 and 164/152 Ma ago. A subsequent study, published in 2008, refined the age range of the formation further, finding that the lower boundary of the Tiaojishan was formed 165 Ma ago, and the upper boundary somewhere between 156 and 153 Ma ago.

== Climate ==
Based on the plant life present in the Tiaojishan Formation, Wang Yongdong and colleagues determined that the climate in Liaoning during the mid Jurassic would have been subtropical to temperate, warm and humid.

== Fauna ==
Beautifully preserved fossils of dinosaurs, pterosaurs, salamanders, insects, arachnids and other invertebrates, conifers, ginkgoes, cycads, horsetails, and ferns, and even the earliest known gliding mammal (Volaticotherium) have been discovered in these rocks.The tuffaceous composition of some rock layers show that this was a volcanic area, occasionally experiencing heavy ashfalls from eruptions. The landscape then was dominated by mountain streams and deep lakes surrounded by forests of gymnosperm trees.

The forests of the Yanliao biota grew in a humid, warm - temperate climate and were dominated by gymnosperm trees. There were ginkgopsids like Ginkoites, Ginkgo, Baiera, Czekanowskia, and Phoenicopsis. There were also conifers like Pityophyllum, Rhipidiocladus, Elatocladus, Schizolepis, and Podozamites. Also, Lycopsids like Lycopodites and Sellaginellities, horsetails (Sphenopsida) like Equisetum, cycads like Anomozamites, and ferns (Filicopsida) like Todites and Coniopteris.

Color key
Taxon	Reclassified taxon	Taxon falsely reported as present	Dubious taxon or junior synonym	Ichnotaxon	Ootaxon	Morphotaxon

Notes
Uncertain or tentative taxa are in small text; ~~crossed out~~ taxa are discredited.

=== Fish ===
Fish of the Tiaojishan Formation
Genus	Species	Location	Stratigraphic position	Abundance	Notes	Images
Yanliaomyzon	Y. occisor	Liaoning			A lamprey.	Yanliaomyzon

=== Salamanders ===
Salamanders of the Tiaojishan Formation
Genus	Species	Location	Stratigraphic position	Abundance	Notes	Images
Beiyanerpeton	B. jianpingensis	Liaoning				Chunerpeton
Chunerpeton	C. tianyiensis					Chunerpeton
Jeholotriton	J. paradoxus					Chunerpeton
Liaoxitriton	L. daohugouensis					Chunerpeton
Pangerpeton	P. sinensis					Chunerpeton

=== Pterosaurs ===
Pterosaurs of the Tiaojishan Formation
Genus	Species	Location	Stratigraphic position	Abundance	Notes	Images
Archaeoistiodactylus	A. linglongtaensis	Liaoning			A monofenestratan known from an incomplete skeleton with a partial skull and lower jaw	Darwinopterus modularis Jeholopterus Kunpengopterus antipollicatus Sinomacrops Wukongopterus
Cascocauda	C. rong	Hebei	Daohugou bed	One specimen	A long-tailed batrachognathine anurognathid known from a complete skeleton with preserved impressions of soft-tissue	Darwinopterus modularis Jeholopterus Kunpengopterus antipollicatus Sinomacrops Wukongopterus
Changchengopterus	C. pani	Hebei			A pterodactyliform known only from a single specimen of a young juvenile, measuring 475 millimeters (18.7 in) in wingspan.	Darwinopterus modularis Jeholopterus Kunpengopterus antipollicatus Sinomacrops Wukongopterus
Daohugoupterus	D. delicatus	Inner Mongolia		One specimen	Pterosaur known from a partial skeleton with soft tissue impressions	Darwinopterus modularis Jeholopterus Kunpengopterus antipollicatus Sinomacrops Wukongopterus
Darwinopterus	D. modularis	Liaoning			A wukongopterid	Darwinopterus modularis Jeholopterus Kunpengopterus antipollicatus Sinomacrops Wukongopterus
Darwinopterus	D. linglongtaensis				A wukongopterid	Darwinopterus modularis Jeholopterus Kunpengopterus antipollicatus Sinomacrops Wukongopterus
Darwinopterus	D. robustodens				A wukongopterid	Darwinopterus modularis Jeholopterus Kunpengopterus antipollicatus Sinomacrops Wukongopterus
Darwinopterus	D. camposi	Liaoning		One specimen	A wukongopterid	Darwinopterus modularis Jeholopterus Kunpengopterus antipollicatus Sinomacrops Wukongopterus
Dendrorhynchoides?	D. curvidentatus?			One specimen	An anurognathid; originally reported from the Yixian Formation, later suggested to be from Tiaojishan; other studies dispute this	Darwinopterus modularis Jeholopterus Kunpengopterus antipollicatus Sinomacrops Wukongopterus
Douzhanopterus	D. zhengi	Linglongta		One specimen	A non-pterodactyloid monofenestratan	Darwinopterus modularis Jeholopterus Kunpengopterus antipollicatus Sinomacrops Wukongopterus
Fenghuangopterus	F. lii	Liaoning			A scaphognathine rhamphorhynchid	Darwinopterus modularis Jeholopterus Kunpengopterus antipollicatus Sinomacrops Wukongopterus
Jeholopterus	J. ninchengensis	Inner Mongolia		Several specimens	A batrachognathine anurognathid with preserved soft tissue anatomy	Darwinopterus modularis Jeholopterus Kunpengopterus antipollicatus Sinomacrops Wukongopterus
Jianchangnathus	J. robustus	Liaoning			A scaphognathine rhamphorhynchid known from a single fossil skeleton	Darwinopterus modularis Jeholopterus Kunpengopterus antipollicatus Sinomacrops Wukongopterus
Jianchangopterus	J. zhaoianus	Liaoning			A scaphognathine rhamphorhynchid known from a nearly complete skeleton with the skull preserved	Darwinopterus modularis Jeholopterus Kunpengopterus antipollicatus Sinomacrops Wukongopterus
Kunpengopterus	K. sinensis	Liaoning	Daohugou bed	Three specimens	A wukongopterid	Darwinopterus modularis Jeholopterus Kunpengopterus antipollicatus Sinomacrops Wukongopterus
Kunpengopterus	K. antipollicatus	Liaoning		Two nearly complete specimens	A wukongopterid	Darwinopterus modularis Jeholopterus Kunpengopterus antipollicatus Sinomacrops Wukongopterus
Liaodactylus	L. primus	Daxishan (Linglongta)		One specimen	A ctenochasmatid	Darwinopterus modularis Jeholopterus Kunpengopterus antipollicatus Sinomacrops Wukongopterus
Luopterus	L. mutoudengensis	Hebei		One specimen	A batrachognathine anurognathid; originally classed as a species of Dendrorhynchoides; suggested to have been Early Cretaceous in age	Darwinopterus modularis Jeholopterus Kunpengopterus antipollicatus Sinomacrops Wukongopterus
Pterorhynchus	P. wellnhoferi	Inner Mongolia	Daohugou bed	One specimen	A darwinopteran known from a nearly complete skeleton including preserved soft-tissue anatomy	Darwinopterus modularis Jeholopterus Kunpengopterus antipollicatus Sinomacrops Wukongopterus
Qinglongopterus	Q. guoi	Liaoning			A rhamphorhynchine rhamphorhynchid known from only one specimen	Darwinopterus modularis Jeholopterus Kunpengopterus antipollicatus Sinomacrops Wukongopterus
Sinomacrops	S. bondei	Hebei	Daohugou bed	One specimen	A long-tailed batrachognathine anurognathid known from a relatively complete skull and skeleton with soft tissue patches	Darwinopterus modularis Jeholopterus Kunpengopterus antipollicatus Sinomacrops Wukongopterus
Wukongopterus	W. lii	Liaoning	Daohugou bed	One specimen	A wukongopterid	Darwinopterus modularis Jeholopterus Kunpengopterus antipollicatus Sinomacrops Wukongopterus

=== Dinosaurs ===
Ornithischians

Ornithischians of the Tiaojishan Formation
Genus	Species	Location	Stratigraphic position	Abundance	Notes	Images
Pulaosaurus	P. qinglong	Qinglong		One specimen	The first neornithischian described from the Yanliao Biota; known from a well-preserved, articulated, nearly complete skeleton including soft tissue impressions and gut contents.	Pulaosaurus Tianyulong
Tianyulong	T. confuciusi	Liaoning			A heterodontosaur initially reported as being from the Early Cretaceous Jehol group; preserved with feather-like filaments	Pulaosaurus Tianyulong

Theropods

Theropods of the Tiaojishan Formation
Genus	Species	Location	Stratigraphic position	Abundance	Notes	Images
Anchiornis	A. huxleyi	Liaoning		Several specimens	An anchiornithid at first believed to be a troodontid; analysis of the fossils has enabled scientists to determine what colors the animal may have exhibited in life	Anchiornis Aurornis Caihong Eosinopteryx Epidexipteryx Pedopenna Scansoriopteryx Serikornis Xiaotingia Yi
Aurornis	A. xui	Liaoning		One specimen	An anchiornithid roughly the size of a modern pheasant	Anchiornis Aurornis Caihong Eosinopteryx Epidexipteryx Pedopenna Scansoriopteryx Serikornis Xiaotingia Yi
Caihong	C. juji	Hebei	Yanliao Biota	One specimen	An anchiornithid known from an adult specimen measuring 400 mm in body length; analysis of the fossils has enabled scientists to determine what colors the animal may have exhibited in life	Anchiornis Aurornis Caihong Eosinopteryx Epidexipteryx Pedopenna Scansoriopteryx Serikornis Xiaotingia Yi
Eosinopteryx	E. brevipenna	Liaoning		One specimen	An anchiornithid at first believed to be a troodontid, known from a single complete skeleton of a subadult or adult individual	Anchiornis Aurornis Caihong Eosinopteryx Epidexipteryx Pedopenna Scansoriopteryx Serikornis Xiaotingia Yi
Epidexipteryx	E. hui	Inner Mongolia	Daohugou beds	One specimen	A scansoriopterygid known from a well-preserved partial skeleton, measuring 10 inches in length (17.5 inches including the incomplete tail feathers)	Anchiornis Aurornis Caihong Eosinopteryx Epidexipteryx Pedopenna Scansoriopteryx Serikornis Xiaotingia Yi
Pedopenna	P. daohugouensis	Inner Mongolia	Daohugou beds	One specimen	An anchiornithid known only from a foot and ankle with soft tissue impressions	Anchiornis Aurornis Caihong Eosinopteryx Epidexipteryx Pedopenna Scansoriopteryx Serikornis Xiaotingia Yi
Scansoriopteryx	S. heilmanni	Liaoning	Exact provenance of type specimen unknown, most likely from the Daohugou Beds	One or two specimens	A sparrow-sized scansoriopterygid known from one or two juvenile specimens	Anchiornis Aurornis Caihong Eosinopteryx Epidexipteryx Pedopenna Scansoriopteryx Serikornis Xiaotingia Yi
Serikornis	S. sungei	Liaoning		One specimen	An anchiornithid with plumulaceous-like feathers	Anchiornis Aurornis Caihong Eosinopteryx Epidexipteryx Pedopenna Scansoriopteryx Serikornis Xiaotingia Yi
Xiaotingia	X. zhengi	Liaoning		One specimen	An anchiornithid originally thought to be either a dromaeosaur or a troodontid	Anchiornis Aurornis Caihong Eosinopteryx Epidexipteryx Pedopenna Scansoriopteryx Serikornis Xiaotingia Yi
Yi	Y. qi	Hebei	Daohugou beds	One specimen	A gliding scansoriopterygid, weighing about 380 grams (0.84 pounds)	Anchiornis Aurornis Caihong Eosinopteryx Epidexipteryx Pedopenna Scansoriopteryx Serikornis Xiaotingia Yi

=== Lizards ===
Color key: Taxon / Reclassified taxon / Taxon falsely reported as present / Dubious taxon or junior synonym / Ichnotaxon / Ootaxon / Morphotaxon	Notes; Uncertain or tentative taxa are in small text; ~~crossed out~~ taxa are discredited.

Lepidosaurs (lizards and relatives) of the Daohugou Beds
Genus	Species	State	Abundance	Notes	Images
Hongshanxi	H. xiei	Liaoning	Complete specimen and counterpart	Family unknown	
Unnamed lizard		Inner Mongolia	One specimen	A new lizard with relatively short forelimbs	
Unnamed lizard		Inner Mongolia	One specimen	A lizard with long hind limbs and a narrow body	

=== Mammals ===
Mammals of the Tiaojishan Formation
Genus	Species	Location	Stratigraphic position	Abundance	Notes	Images
Agilodocodon	A. scansorius	Inner Mongolia	Daohugou bed		A shrew-sized, arboreal docodontid	Agilodocodon Docofossor Juramaia Maiopatagium Megaconus Volaticotherium
Arboroharamiya	A. jenkinsi	Liaoning		One specimen	An arboreal, prehensile-tailed euharamiyid haramiyidan estimated to have weighed about 354 grams	Agilodocodon Docofossor Juramaia Maiopatagium Megaconus Volaticotherium
Arboroharamiya	A. fuscus			A preserved skeleton with fur	An arboreal, prehensile-tailed euharamiyid haramiyidan with a specific fur	Agilodocodon Docofossor Juramaia Maiopatagium Megaconus Volaticotherium
Docofossor	D. brachydactylus	Hebei		One specimen	A docodontid specialized for a subterranean burrowing lifestyle	Agilodocodon Docofossor Juramaia Maiopatagium Megaconus Volaticotherium
Juramaia	J. sinensis	Liaoning		One specimen	A small, shrew-like therian which weighed around 15–17 grams (0.53–0.60 oz); it may be a stem-eutherian, but this classification has been questioned by some	Agilodocodon Docofossor Juramaia Maiopatagium Megaconus Volaticotherium
Maiopatagium	M. furculiferum					Agilodocodon Docofossor Juramaia Maiopatagium Megaconus Volaticotherium
Megaconus	M. mammaliaformis	Inner Mongolia	Daohugou bed	One specimen	An eleutherodontid haramiyidan thought to have been a herbivore that lived on the ground	Agilodocodon Docofossor Juramaia Maiopatagium Megaconus Volaticotherium
Microdocodon	M. gracilis		Daohugou bed		A tegotheriid docodontan	Agilodocodon Docofossor Juramaia Maiopatagium Megaconus Volaticotherium
Qishou	Q. jizantang				Euharamiyida	Agilodocodon Docofossor Juramaia Maiopatagium Megaconus Volaticotherium
Rugosodon	R. eurasiaticus	Liaoning	Daxishan site	One specimen	An omnivorous paulchoffatoid multituberculate; one of the oldest-known multituberculates It is estimated to have weighed between 65 and 80 grams, about that of an average chipmunk.	Agilodocodon Docofossor Juramaia Maiopatagium Megaconus Volaticotherium
Volaticotherium	V. antiquum	Inner Mongolia	Daohugou bed	One specimen	A gliding, flying squirrel-like volaticotherian eutriconodont with a specialized gliding membrane	Agilodocodon Docofossor Juramaia Maiopatagium Megaconus Volaticotherium
Vilevolodon	V. diplomylos				A gliding eleutherodontid haramiyidan	Agilodocodon Docofossor Juramaia Maiopatagium Megaconus Volaticotherium
Xianshou	X. linglong, X. songae				A gliding euharamiyidan	Agilodocodon Docofossor Juramaia Maiopatagium Megaconus Volaticotherium

=== Arthropods ===
The following orders are represented in the formation; Ephemeroptera, Odonata, Plecoptera, Blattodea, Orthoptera, Hemiptera, Neuroptera, Coleoptera, Hymenoptera, and Diptera.

An indeterminate aeshnoid (insect) species is known from Liaoning.

Color key: Taxon / Reclassified taxon / Taxon falsely reported as present / Dubious taxon or junior synonym / Ichnotaxon / Ootaxon / Morphotaxon	Notes; Uncertain or tentative taxa are in small text; ~~crossed out~~ taxa are discredited.

Arthropods of the Daohugou Beds
Genus	Species	State	Abundance	Notes	Images
Ahirmoneura	A. neimengguensis	Inner Mongolia		A tangle-veined fly	
Archirhagio	A. striatus			Archisargid flies	
Archirhagio	A. zhangi	Inner Mongolia		Archisargid flies	
Archisargus	A. spurivenius			Archisargid flies	
Archisargus	A. strigatus			Archisargid flies	
Calosargus	C. (Calosargus) antiquus			Archisargid flies	
Calosargus	C. (C.) bellus			Archisargid flies	
Calosargus	C. (C.) daohugouensis			Archisargid flies	
Calosargus	C. (C.) hani			Archisargid flies	
Calosargus	C. (C.) tenuicellulatus			Archisargid flies	
Calosargus	C. (C.) validus			Archisargid flies	
Calosargus	C. (Pterosargus) sinicus	Inner Mongolia		Archisargid flies	
Darwinula	D. impudica	Liaoning		An ostracod	
Darwinula	D. magna	Liaoning		An ostracod	
Darwinula	D. sarytirmenensis	Liaoning		An ostracod	
Daohugocorixa	D. vulcanica			A water boatman	
Fuyous	F. gregarious			A mayfly	
Eoplectreurys	E. gertschi		1 Specimen	A plectreurid spider	
Homocatabrycus	H. liui			A schizophorid flying water beetle	
Jurassinemestrinus	J. orientalis	Inner Mongolia		A Nemestrinoid fly	
Menopraesagus	M. explanatus			Schizophorid flying water beetles	
Menopraesagus	M. oxycerus			Schizophorid flying water beetles	
Menopraesagus	M. grammicus			Schizophorid flying water beetles	
Meoslova	M. daohugouensis			An archisargid fly	
Mostovskisargus	M. portentosus	Inner Mongolia		Archisargid flies	
Mostovskisargus	M. signatus	Inner Mongolia		Archisargid flies	
Shantous	S. lacustris			A mayfly	
Sinoschizala	S. darani			A schizophorid flying water beetle	

=== Other invertebrates ===
Genus	Species	Province	Stratigraphic Position	Abundance	Notes
Shaanxiconcha	S. cliovata	Liaoning		A bivalve	

== Flora ==
Survey based on Wang et al. 2006 unless otherwise noted.

=== Bennettitales ===
Cycad-like plants, the most abundant plant group in the formation. 27 species in 11 genera.

Bennettitales of the Tiaojishan Formation
Genus	Species	Location	Stratigraphic position	Abundance	Notes	Images
Anomozamites						
Bennetticarpus						
Cycadolepis						
Jacutiella						
Pteriophyllum						
Ptilophyllum						
Williamsonia						
Williamsoniella						
Zamiophyllum						
Zamites						

=== Ginkgoales ===
Prehistoric ginkgo trees, common, with 11 species present in 6 genera.

Ginkgoales of the Tiaojishan Formation
Genus	Species	Location	Stratigraphic position	Abundance	Notes	Images
Ginkgo						
Ixostrobus						
Phoenicopsis						
Sphenobaiera						
Solenites						

=== Pinophyta ===
Conifers, 5 species present in 4 genera.

Pinophytans of the Tiaojishan Formation
Genus	Species	Location	Stratigraphic position	Abundance	Notes	Images
Pityocladus						
Pityophyllum						
Podizamites						
Schizolepis						
Yuccites						

=== Pteridophyta ===
Leptosporangiate ferns, represented by 17 species in 8 genera, are the second most abundant plant type in the formation.

Pteridophytans of the Tiaojishan Formation
Genus	Species	Location	Stratigraphic position	Abundance	Notes	Images
Ashicaulis		Beipiao		One specimen	A whole-plant osmundacean. Preserved stem 50 cm high and 35–41 cm across. Sterile fronds of Cladophlebis-type, fertile fronds of Todites-type with in-situ spores of Osmundacidites-type.	
Cladophlebis					Form genus of sterile fern fronds, typically assigned to Osmundaceae. A whole-plant osmundacean tree-fern with Cladophlebis fronds attached is known from this formation.	
Claytosmunda	C. chengii, C. liaoningensis, C. plumites, C. preosmunda, C. sinica, C. wangii	Beipiao, Liaoning		Numerous specimens	Interrupted ferns. Numerous fossil rhizomes previously assigned to Millerocaulis or Ashicaulis were interpreted to be close relatives and possible precursors of Claytosmunda claytoniana, the only extant representative of the genus.	
Coniopteris					Dicksoniaceae Tree ferns.	
Dicksonia	D. changeyingziensis				Dicksoniaceae Tree ferns.	
Dicksonia	D. charielsa				Dicksoniaceae Tree ferns.	
Eboracia					Dicksoniaceae Tree ferns.	
Hausmannia	H. shebudaiensis			Uncommon.	A dipterid fern.	
Marattia	M. hoerenensis			Uncommon.	A marattiopsid fern.	
Raphaelia	R. stricta				A fern.	
Todites	T. denticulata				Fertile fronds of osmundacean ferns that resemble Todea. Known to attach to "Ashicaulis"-type stems with sterile Cladophlebis-type fronds in this formation.	
Todites	T. williamsonii				Isolated fertile fronds of osmundacean ferns resembling Todea.	

=== Other plants ===
Cycads, fairly diverse, with 10 species present in 2 genera.

Cycads of the Tiaojishan Formation
Genus	Species	Location	Stratigraphic position	Abundance	Notes	Images
Ctenis					Cycadales.	
Equisetum					Horsetails.	
Neocalamites					Horsetails.	
Nilssonia					Cycadales.	
Hepacitities	H. shebudaiensis			Uncommon.	A bryophyte.	
Taeniopteris sp.				Uncommon.		
