= Daohugoupterus =

Daohugoupterus Temporal range: Bathonian-Oxfordian, 164 Ma

Scientific classification
- Kingdom: Animalia
- Phylum: Chordata
- Class: Reptilia
- Order: †Pterosauria
- Genus: †Daohugoupterus; Cheng et al., 2015
- Species: †D. delicatus

Binomial name
- †Daohugoupterus delicatus Cheng et al., 2015

Extinct genus of reptiles

Daohugoupterus is a genus of pterosaur from the Middle to Late Jurassic Daohugou Beds of the Tiaojishan Formation in Inner Mongolia, China.

== Discovery and naming ==
Through field work by Zhou Zhonghe and Li Yan, the Institute of Vertebrate Paleontology and Paleoanthropology at Beijing acquired a pterosaur specimen found at the village of Daohugou near Linglongta. It was prepared by Li Yutong. The specimen is catalogued as IVPP V12537. This holotype is a partial skeleton with soft tissue impressions, compressed on a plate and counterplate. This specimen includes part of the torso and pectoral girdle, the left humerus (upper arm bone), both coracoids, right scapula, the sternal plate, neck vertebrae, back vertebrae, ribs, and the posterior part of the skull and lower jaws.

Daohugoupterus was named and described in 2015 by Cheng Xin, Wang Xiaolin, Jiang Shunxing and Alexander Wilhelm Armin Kellner. The type and only known species is Daohugoupterus delicatus. The generic name combines a reference to Daohugou with a Latinised Greek πτερόν, pteron, "wing". The specific name means "delicate" in Latin, in reference to the gracile build.

== Description ==
Daohugoupterus is a small pterosaur. The humerus is 41.8 mm (1.65 in) long.

Two distinguishing traits were indicated, which were considered possible autapomorphies: the nasal bones deeply invade the frontal bones, and the sternal plate is broad, being 2.5 times wider than it is long.

== Classification ==
The short neck vertebrae, presence of cervical ribs, and the form of the humerus with a quadrangular deltopectoral crest indicate that Daohugoupterus was a relatively basal pterosaur, outside of the Pterodactyloidea. It was placed Pterosauria incertae sedis.

== Paleoecology ==
Daohugoupterus is a member of the Yanliao Biota, which also includes the pterosaurs Jeholopterus and Pterorhynchus; Daohugoupterus is the smallest of the three.
