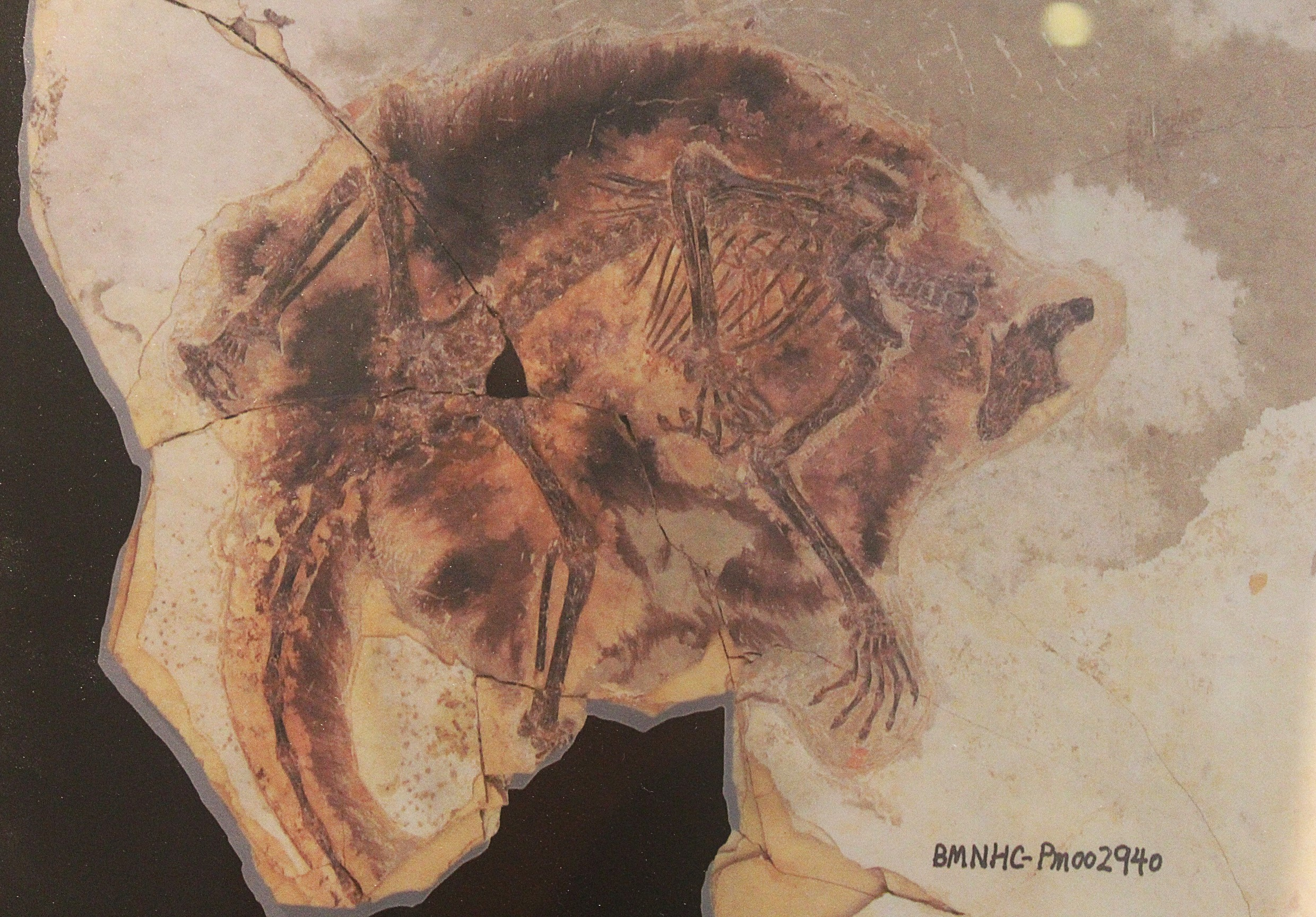
- Holotype specimen (BMNH 2940) of M. furculiferum, National Natural History Museum of China

Scientific classification
- Kingdom: Animalia
- Phylum: Chordata
- Clade: Synapsida
- Clade: Therapsida
- Clade: Cynodontia
- Clade: Mammaliaformes
- Order: †Haramiyida
- Family: †Eleutherodontidae
- Genus: †Maiopatagium; Luo et al., 2017

Species
- †Maiopatagium furculiferum Luo et al., 2017; †Maiopatagium sibiricum Averianov, et al., 2019

= Maiopatagium =

Maiopatagium Temporal range: Bathonian-Oxfordian ~165–153 Ma

Extinct genus of mammaliaforms

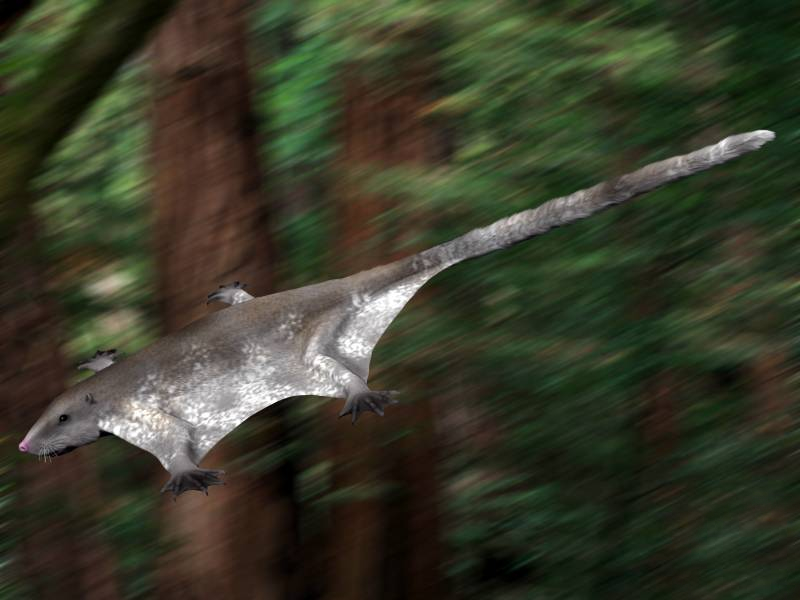
CGI reconstruction of a gliding M. furculiferum

Maiopatagium is an extinct genus of gliding euharamiyids which existed in Asia during the Jurassic period. It possessed a patagium between its limbs and presumably had similar lifestyle to living flying squirrels and colugos. The type species is Maiopatagium furculiferum, which was described from the Tiaojishan Formation by Zhe-Xi Luo in 2017; it lived in what is now the Liaoning region of China during the late Jurassic (Oxfordian age). Maiopatagium and Vilevolodon, described concurrently, offer clues to the ways various synapsids have taken to the skies over evolutionary time scales. A second species, M. sibiricum, was described from the Bathonian aged Itat Formation in western Siberia, Russia in 2019
