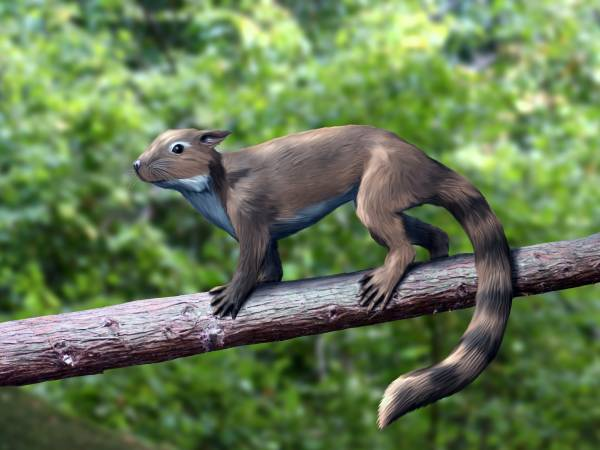

Scientific classification
- Kingdom: Animalia
- Phylum: Chordata
- Clade: Synapsida
- Clade: Therapsida
- Clade: Cynodontia
- Clade: Mammaliaformes
- Order: †Haramiyida
- Genus: †Shenshou; Bi, Wang, Guan, Sheng and Meng, 2014
- Species: †S. lui

Binomial name
- †Shenshou lui Bi, Wang, Guan, Sheng and Meng, 2014

= Shenshou =

Shenshou Temporal range: 160 Ma Oxfordian

Extinct genus of mammaliaforms

Shenshou is an extinct monotypic genus of haramiyidan dating from the Oxfordian stage of the Late Jurassic, approximately 160 million years ago. Fossils were recovered from the Tiaojishan Formation in the Liaoning province of China.

== Etymology ==
The generic name is derived from Mandarin (神獸 shénshòu) shen, meaning deity, and shou, meaning animal, while the specific name is in reference to Lu Jianhua, the scientist who collected the holotype specimen.

== Description ==
Shenshou individuals are believed to have weighed 300 grams (11 oz). Shenshou possessed large incisor teeth, while its molars were characterised by an M^{2}/M_{2} occlusal pattern resembling that of multituberculates. The presence of a three-boned middle ear suggests these animals were mammals; however, it has since been determined haramiyidans developed their ear bones independently from true mammals and are Mammaliaformes outside of the mammal crown-group.

== Palaeobiology ==
=== Palaeoecology ===
Shenshou is thought to be arboreal because it had a light frame, a prehensile and elongated tail, and hands and feet which had evolved for clutching and enabled the animal to climb. These features, including the large incisors of Shenshou, made the animal resemble a squirrel. However, Shenshou are not the direct ancestors of squirrels, the resemblance being purely due to convergent evolution. The teeth, which have a number of cusps, suggest that Shenshou was probably an omnivore, most likely with a diet of fruits, nuts and insects. The molars of Shenshou were incapable or barely capable of shearing food, as evidenced by dental microwear.
