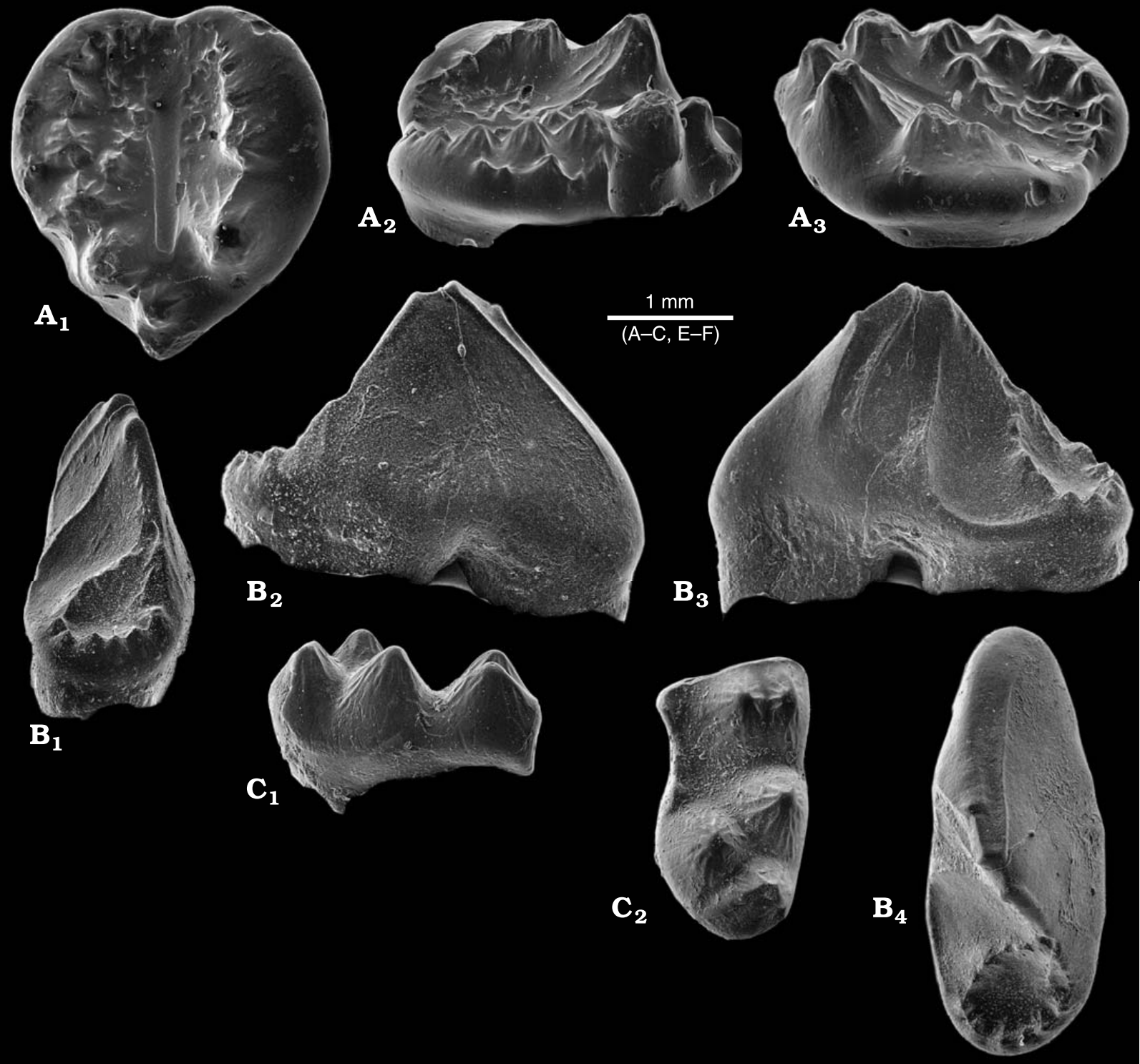
- Teeth of Kermackodon, including M2 upper molar (A), p4 lower last premolar (B) and a P3 or P4 upper premolar (C)

Scientific classification
- Kingdom: Animalia
- Phylum: Chordata
- Class: Mammalia
- Subclass: †Allotheria
- Genus: †Kermackodon; Butler & Hooker, 2005

Type species
- Kermackodon multicuspis Butler & Hooker, 2005

Other species
- K. oxfordensis (Kermack et al., 1998) (Originally Eleutherodon oxfordensis (genus name preoccupied))

= Kermackodon =

Kermackodon Temporal range: Bathonian

Extinct genus of mammals

Kermackodon is a genus of extinct allotherian mammaliform, known from the Middle Jurassic of England. It combines features of multituberculates with those of euharamiyidans. The remains of type species, K. multicuspis were collected from Kirtlington Quarry in Oxford, England, by a team lead from UCL led by Professor Kenneth Kermack after whom the taxon is named, from sediments of the Forest Marble Formation, dating to the Bathonian stage of the Middle Jurassic. The genus and species were named by Percy M. Butler and Jerry Hooker in 2005. The remains comprise a left upper molar (M2), a lower last premolar, initially considered a left but later considered more likely to be right (p4), and an incomplete non-last upper premolar (P3 or P4). A second species, K. oxfordensis, from Kirtlington and also sediments of the White Limestone Formation at Woodeaton Quarry was assigned to the genus in 2022, originally placed in the separate genus Eleutherodon, genus name preoccupied by Eleutherodon Mercerat, 1891. A 2020 study considered it to be more closely related to multituberculates than to euharamiyidans, while the 2022 study considered it to be a member of Euharamiyida.
