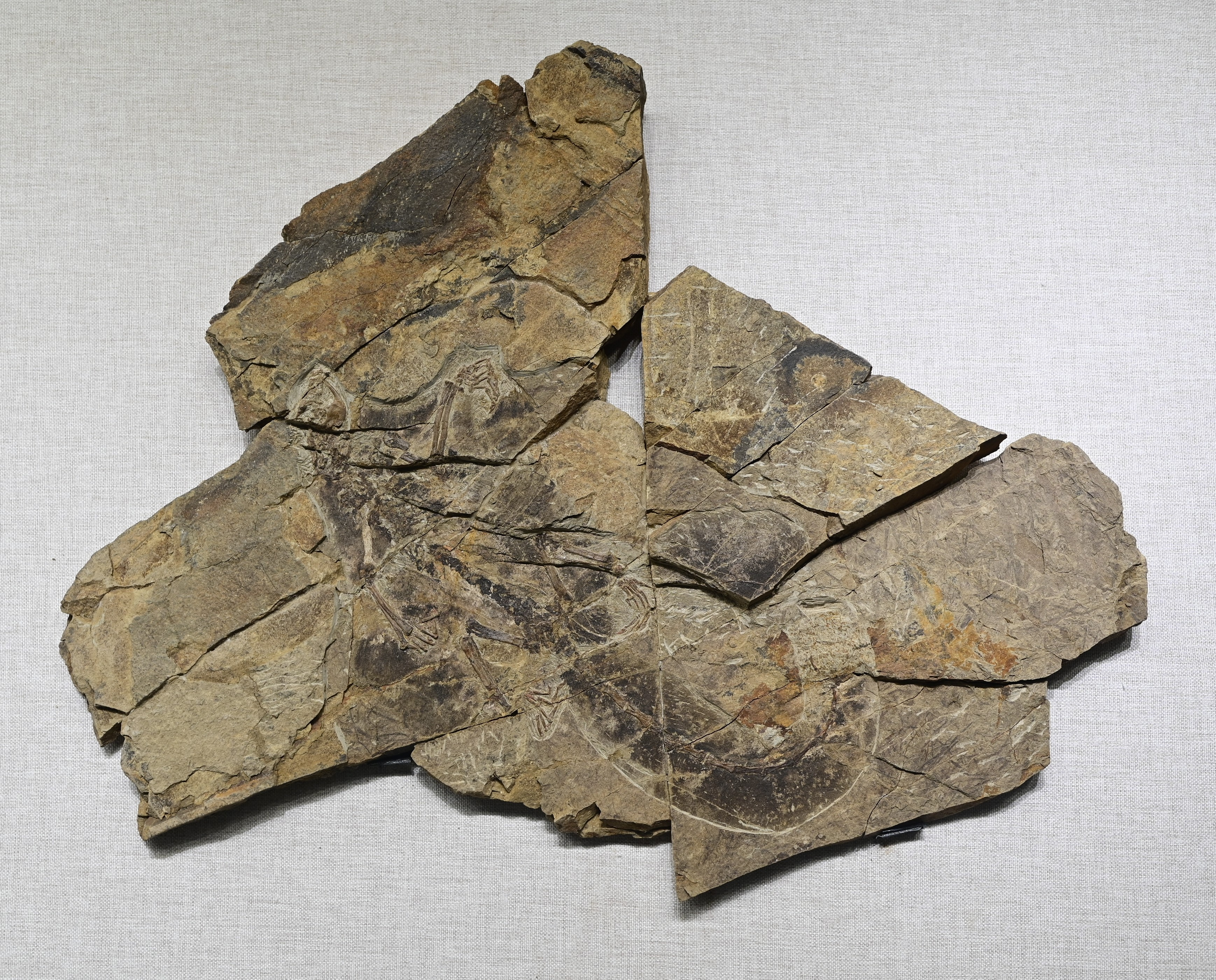
- Fossil specimen of Arboroharamiya jenkinsi from the Baoding Natural History Museum

Scientific classification
- Kingdom: Animalia
- Phylum: Chordata
- Clade: Synapsida
- Clade: Therapsida
- Clade: Cynodontia
- Clade: Mammaliaformes
- Order: †Haramiyida
- Genus: †Arboroharamiya; Zheng et al., 2013

Type species
- †Arboroharamiya jenkinsi Zheng et al., 2013

Other species
- †A. allinhopsoni Han et al., 2017; †A. fuscus Li et al., 2025

= Arboroharamiya =

Arboroharamiya Temporal range: Late Jurassic, 159 Ma

Extinct genus of mammaliaforms

Arboroharamiya is an extinct genus of mammaliaform from the Late Jurassic Tiaojishan Formation of Inner Mongolia, China. Arboroharamiya belongs to a group of mammaliaforms called Haramiyida. The genus contains three species: A. jenkinsi (the type species), A. allinhopsoni and A. fuscus. Based on the melanosomes preserved in its fur, Arboroharamiya likely had a uniformly dark-brown coloration, similar to that of other early mammaliaforms including Vilevolodon and Megaconus.

When Arboroharamiya was included in a phylogenetic analysis of early mammals and mammaliaforms, Haramiyida was found to be a group within Mammalia, the true mammals. However, in a different analysis which included Megaconus, Haramiyida was placed outside Mammalia as a more basal ("primitive") group of mammaliaforms. The classification of Arboroharamiya and other haramiyidans as true mammals fits with what most previous studies have found, but since Arboroharamiya and Megaconus were not included in the same phylogenetic analysis, their position within Mammaliaformes remains uncertain.

== Description ==
Arboroharamiya is the largest known haramiyidan, estimated to have weighed about 354 g (12.5 oz). It has several features in common with living mammals, including a lower jaw formed by a single bone, the dentary, and hands and feet that each have four fingers with three bones each and one finger with two bones. Arboroharamiya is unlike any modern mammal in having a lower jaw that can move up, down, and backward, but not forward. It has a rodent-like dentition with enlarged incisors and molars and no canines, which is also seen in Multituberculata, but this feature probably evolved independently in Arboroharamiya. The incus of Arboroharamiya was characterised by a robust stapedial process, a narrow short process, and an almond-shaped body. Its stapes possessed a strong process for the insertion of the stapedius muscle.

Arboroharamiya had a long tail that might have been prehensile, and very long fingers. Based on the shape of its teeth, Arboroharamiya might have been a granivore or an omnivore. It was an arboreal animal, with the specimens of two species (A. allinhopsoni and A. fuscus) preserving the patagia, suggesting that it was a glider. Analysis on the fur impressions of A. fuscus revealed high concentration of copper associated with eumelanin, indicative of uniformly dark-brown coloration with no evidence of color patterns, which was also the case in other early mammaliaforms from China: Vilevolodon, Megaconus, indeterminate docodonts (SDUST-V0006 and SDUST-V0007) and indeterminate eutherian (SDUST-V0008).

== Classification ==
Arboroharamiya belongs to a clade or evolutionary grouping called Mammaliaformes, which includes mammals and their closest extinct relatives from the Triassic and Jurassic periods. Within Mammaliaformes, Arboroharamiya falls within the clade Haramiyida. Haramiyidans have been known since the 1840s, but only from fossilized teeth and a single partial lower jaw. However, several features of the teeth have shown for many years that haramiyidans are among the most basal of mammaliaforms. Recent phylogenetic analyses, or analyses of evolutionary relationships, differ on whether or not haramiyidans are true mammals in the crown group Mammalia (the clade including the most recent common ancestor of living mammals, and all its descendants). Some analyses place Haramiyida outside crown group Mammalia, meaning that they diverged from other mammaliaforms before the most recent common ancestor of living mammals appeared. Other analyses place Haramiyida within Mammalia as part of an extinct group of Mesozoic mammals called Allotheria, which also includes Multituberculata. When Arboroharamiya itself was incorporated into a phylogenetic analysis, Haramiyida fell within Allotheria as a group within Mammalia. Below is a cladogram or evolutionary tree from the analysis:

- Mammaliaformes
  - Sinoconodon
  - - Adelobasileus
    - - - Morganucodon
        - Megazostrodon
      - - - Haldanodon
          - Castorocauda
        - - Hadrocodium
          - Mammalia
            - Australosphenida (monotremes and extinct relatives)
            - Boreosphenida
              - Fruitafossor
              - - Eutriconodonta
                - - Allotheria
                    - Tinodon
                    - - Haramiyavia
                      - - Arboroharamiya
                        - Multituberculata
                          - Plagiaulacida
                          - Cimolodonta
                  - - Symmetrodonta
                    - - - Dryolestes
                        - Henkelotherium
                      - - - Amphitherium
                          - Peramus
                        - - Vincelestes
                          - - Nanolestes
                            - - Aegialodon
                              - Theria
                                - Metatheria (marsupials and extinct relatives)
                                - Eutheria (placental mammals)
