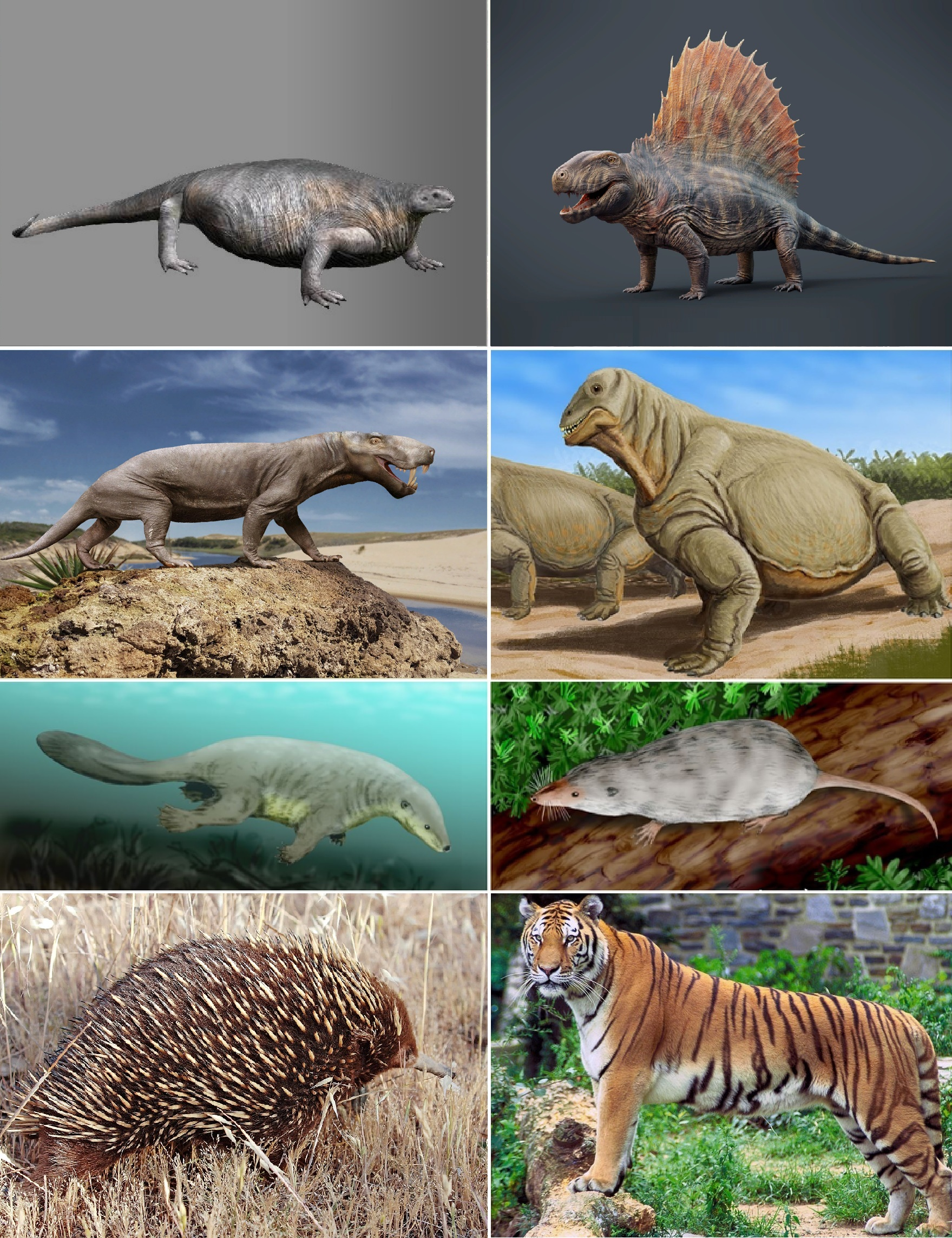
- Examples of synapsids (left to right, top to bottom): Cotylorhynchus, Dimetrodon, Inostrancevia, Moschops, Castorocauda, Adelobasileus, Tachyglossus aculeatus, and Panthera tigris

Scientific classification
- Kingdom: Animalia
- Phylum: Chordata
- Clade: Tetrapoda
- Clade: Reptiliomorpha
- Clade: Amniota
- Clade: Synapsida; Osborn, 1903

Subgroups
- †Asaphestera?; †Protoclepsydrops?; †Diadectomorpha?; †Caseasauria?; †Caseidae; †Eothyrididae; †Phreatophasma?; Eupelycosauria; †Ophiacodontidae; †Varanopidae?; Haptodontiformes; †Edaphosauridae; Sphenacodontia; other extinct groups; †Sphenacodontidae; Therapsida

Synonyms
- Theropsida (Seeley, 1895) "Pelycosauria" (Cladistically including therapsids)

= Synapsida =

Synapsida Temporal range: Late Carboniferous (Pennsylvanian)-Present

Clade of tetrapods

Synapsida (Note: Greek: συν-, romanized: syn-, lit. 'together' + ἁψίς (apsís, 'arch') > *συναψίδης (synapsídes) "having a fused arch"; synonymous with theropsids (Greek, "beast-face")) is a diverse group of tetrapod vertebrates that includes all mammals and their extinct relatives. It is one of the two major clades of the group Amniota, the other being the more diverse group Sauropsida (which includes all extant reptiles and birds). Synapsids have a single lower temporal fenestra, an opening low in the skull roof behind each eye socket. These openings create a bony arch that allows for the attachment of larger jaw muscles and a more efficient bite. While previously argued to be distinctive to synapsids, single temporal fenestrae are also found in many primitive sauropsids. It has recently been argued that the last common ancestor of synapsids and sauropsids shared a single lower temporal fenestra.

Historically, both early members of the Synapsida lineage as well as sauropsids have been considered "reptiles". Therefore, non-mammalian synapsids were then described as mammal-like reptiles in classical systematics, and non-therapsid synapsids were also referred to as pelycosaurs or pelycosaur-grade synapsids. These paraphyletic terms have fallen out of favor and are only used informally (if at all) in modern literature, as it is now known that all extant reptiles are more closely related to each other and birds than to synapsids, so the word "reptile" has been re-defined to mean only members of Sauropsida or even just an under-clade thereof. In a cladistic sense, synapsids are in fact a monophyletic sister taxon of sauropsids, rather than a part of the sauropsid lineage. Modern alternatives sometimes used include stem mammals, proto-mammals, paramammals or pan-mammals. Most lineages of pelycosaur-grade synapsids were replaced by the more advanced therapsids, which evolved from sphenacodontian pelycosaurs, at the end of the Early Permian, a transition known as Olson's Gap/Extinction.

The earliest synapsids appeared towards the end of the Carboniferous, around 315 to 307 million years ago. Synapsids were the largest terrestrial vertebrates in the Permian period (299 to 251 mya), rivalled only by some large pareiasaurian parareptiles such as Scutosaurus. They were the dominant land predators of the late Paleozoic and early Mesozoic, with eupelycosaurs such as Dimetrodon, Titanophoneus and Inostrancevia being the apex predators during the Permian, and theriodonts such as Moschorhinus during the Early Triassic. Synapsid population and diversity were severely reduced by the Capitanian mass extinction event and the Permian–Triassic extinction event, and only two groups of therapsids, the dicynodonts and eutheriodonts (consisting of therocephalians and cynodonts) are known to have survived into the Triassic. These therapsids rebounded as disaster taxa during the early Mesozoic, with the dicynodont Lystrosaurus making up as much as 95% of all land species at one time, but declined again after the Smithian–Spathian boundary event with their dominant niches largely taken over by the rise of archosaurian sauropsids, first by the pseudosuchians and then by the pterosaurs and dinosaurs. The cynodont group Probainognathia, which includes the group Mammaliaformes, were the only synapsids to survive beyond the Triassic, During the Jurassic, cynodonts lived mostly nocturnally to avoid competition with dinosaurs. After the Cretaceous–Paleogene extinction event wiped out all non-avian dinosaurs and pterosaurs, synapsids (as mammals) rose to dominance once again during the Cenozoic, with roughly 6,800 species living currently.

== Linnaean and cladistic classifications ==
At the turn of the 20th century, synapsids were thought to be one of the four main subclasses of reptiles. However, this notion was disproved upon closer inspection of skeletal remains, as synapsids are differentiated from reptiles by their distinctive temporal openings. These openings in the skull bones allowed the attachment of larger jaw muscles, hence a more efficient bite.

Synapsids were subsequently considered to be a later reptilian lineage that became mammals by gradually evolving increasingly mammalian features, hence the name "mammal-like reptiles" (also known as pelycosaurs). These became the traditional terms for all Paleozoic (early) synapsids. More recent studies have debunked this notion as well, and reptiles are now classified within Sauropsida (sauropsids), the sister group to synapsids, thus making synapsids their own taxonomic group.

As a result, the paraphyletic terms "mammal-like reptile" and "pelycosaur" are seen as outdated and disfavored in technical literature, and the term stem mammal (or sometimes protomammal or paramammal) is used instead. Phylogenetically, it is now understood that synapsids comprise an independent branch of the tree of life. The monophyly of Synapsida is not in doubt, and the expressions such as "Synapsida contains the mammals" and "synapsids gave rise to the mammals" both express the same phylogenetic hypothesis. This terminology reflects the modern cladistic approach to animal relationships, according to which the only valid groups are those that include all of the descendants of a common ancestor: these are known as monophyletic groups, or clades.

Additionally, Reptilia (reptiles) has been revised into a monophyletic group and is considered entirely distinct from Synapsida, falling within Sauropsida, the sister group of Synapsida within Amniota.

=== Primitive and advanced synapsids ===
The synapsids are traditionally divided for convenience, into therapsids, an advanced group of synapsids and the branch within which mammals evolved, and stem mammals, (previously known as pelycosaurs), comprising the other six more primitive families of synapsids. Stem mammals were all rather lizard-like, with sprawling gait and possibly horny scutes, while therapsids tended to have a more erect pose and possibly hair, at least in some forms. In traditional taxonomy, the Synapsida encompasses two distinct grades: the low-slung stem mammals have given rise to the more erect therapsids, who in their turn have given rise to the mammals. In traditional vertebrate classification, the stem mammals and therapsids were both considered orders of the subclass Synapsida.

=== Practical versus phylogenetic usage of "synapsid" and "therapsid" ===
In phylogenetic nomenclature, the terms are used somewhat differently, as the daughter clades are included. Most papers published during the 21st century have treated "Pelycosaur" as an informal grouping of primitive members. Therapsida has remained in use as a clade containing both the traditional therapsid families and mammals.

Although Synapsida and Therapsida include modern mammals, in practical usage, those two terms are used almost exclusively when referring to the more basal members that lie outside of Mammaliaformes.

== Characteristics ==
=== Apomorphies ===
A 2025 study proposed that Synapsida is ancestrally characterised by 17 unambiguous apomorphies (distinguishing traits) relative to the ancestral amniote condition. These include: the maxillary canal (a tubular hollow inside the skull) has well defined connected nasal canals, the supraoccipital bones have processes (growths) that frame the flocular fossa (the part of the braincase that surrounds the flocculus lobe of the cerebellum of the brain), the opisthotic and prootic bones associated with the ear are fused in adult individuals, the opisthotic has an otic trough, the ventral (towards the underside of the skull) end of the posterior semicircular canal is separated by bone from the utricular region, the suture (joint) between the basioccipital and parabasisphenoid does not overlap, the lower posterior (posteroventral) main part of the parasphenoid is emarginated (having a shallow depression at its edge), the epipterygoid has a sheetlike columella, the palatine bones are only weakly incised by the choanae (the nasal openings on the roof of the mouth), the adductor fossa (an opening in the lower jaw) is higher than the medially (inward towards the midline of the head) inflected flange of the prearticular bone, the (distal) head of the humerus connecting to the radius and ulna is relatively wide compared to the length of the bone, the ventral (lower) surface of the entepicondyle of the humerus is flat or slightly convex, the pubis is shorter than the acetabulum, the femur is short and broad, and a fourth trochanter is present. Several more ambiguous apomorphies were proposed, including the paired postparietal bones are fused together, the premaxilla bone had four or less teeth, the alveolar shelf (which surrounds the teeth) of the maxilla is deeper than the width of the tooth from side to side (mediolaterally), and the squamosal does not contact the upper posterior (posterodorsal) margin of the jugal bone.^{supplemental material}

=== Skull openings ===
The synapsids are distinguished by a single hole, known as the temporal fenestra, in the skull behind each eye. This schematic shows the skull viewed from the left side. The middle opening is the orbit of the eye; the opening to the right of it is the temporal fenestra.

Synapsids evolved a temporal fenestra behind each eye orbit on the lateral surface of the skull. It may have provided new attachment sites for jaw muscles. Originally, the openings in the skull left the inner cranium covered only by the jaw muscles, but in higher therapsids and mammals, the sphenoid bone has expanded to close the opening. This has left the lower margin of the opening as an arch extending from the lower edges of the braincase.

While historically argued to be distinctive to synapsids, recent research has demonstrated that many primitive sauropsids also have a single lower temporal fenestra and it has also been suggested that many thought to be sauropsids with anapsid skulls completely lacking temporal fenestrae are not reptiles but stem-amniotes, implying that this trait was possibly present in the last common ancestor of synapsids and sauropsids, and not a distinctive trait of Synapsida.

In many non-mammalian synapsids, the eye sockets had sclerotic rings similar to those of many reptiles and birds. Sclerotic rings were retained in non-mammalian cynodonts, but have been lost in modern mammals.

Synapsids ancestrally had an opening on the skull roof (pineal foramen) for the parietal eye, a light sensitive organ still found in some amphibians and reptiles used for calibrating thermoregulation and the circadian rhythm among other functions. The functionality of the eye was lost and the pineal foramen closed over in the cynodont line ancestral to mammals (Probainognathia).

=== Teeth ===
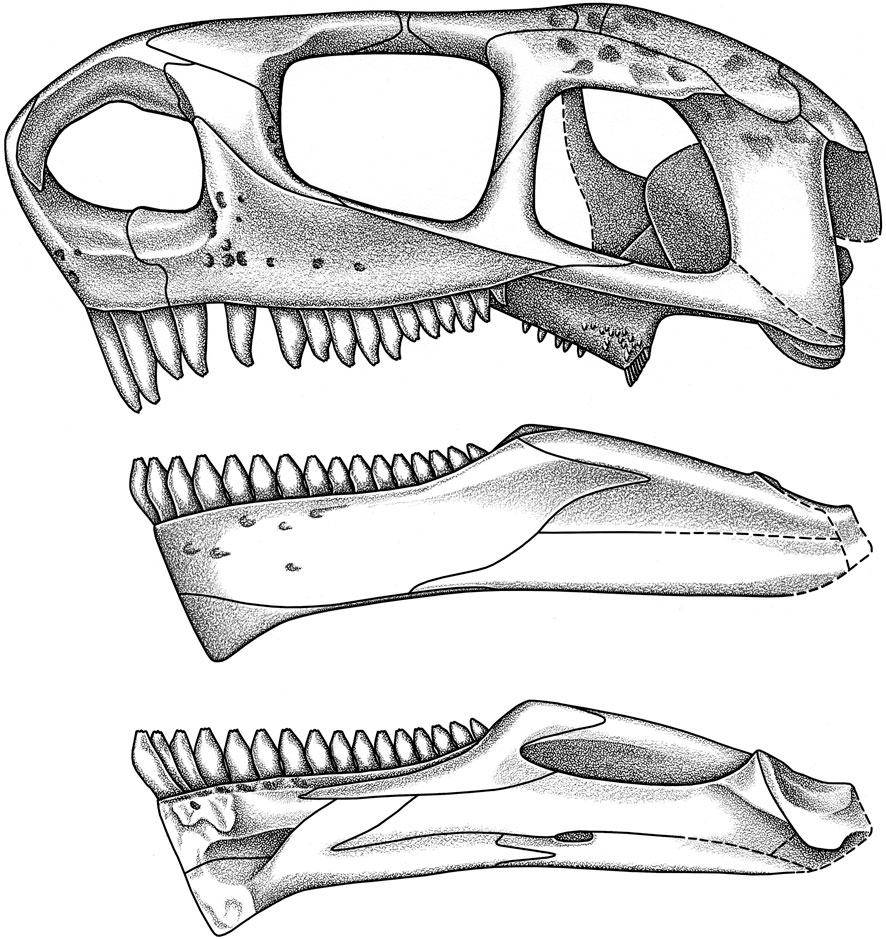
Skull of Cotylorhynchus, a basal synapsid

Skull of Dimetrodon (Sphenacodontia, Sphenacodontidae), showing heterodont dentiton with strongly varying tooth sizes across the tooth row

Skull of Jonkeria (Therapsida, Dinocephalia), showing differentiation into incisor, canine, and postcanine teeth

Skull of Morganucodon (Mammaliaformes), with fully differentiated, mammal-type teeth with cusps

Many synapsids including living mammals are characterised by heterodont teeth that vary in size and/or shape along the tooth row. This was relatively incipient in many early "pelycosaur" synapsids, but became pronounced in advanced sphenacodontian synapsids, particularly in therapsids, where the teeth became differentiated into incisor, canine and postcanine teeth. The dicynodonts are unique among synapsids for losing most (or all in the case of some dicynodonts) of their teeth in favour of a horny, keratinous turtle-like beak. Tooth cusps first emerged within the cynodont ancestors of mammals. Most non-mammalian synapsids are thought to have continuously replaced their teeth throughout life (polyphyodonty), with advanced cynodonts having evolved limited cycles of tooth replacement, culminating in the emergence of the two sets of teeth (diphyodonty) in Mammaliformes (or possibly the slightly broader grouping Mammaliamorpha).

=== Jaw and ears ===
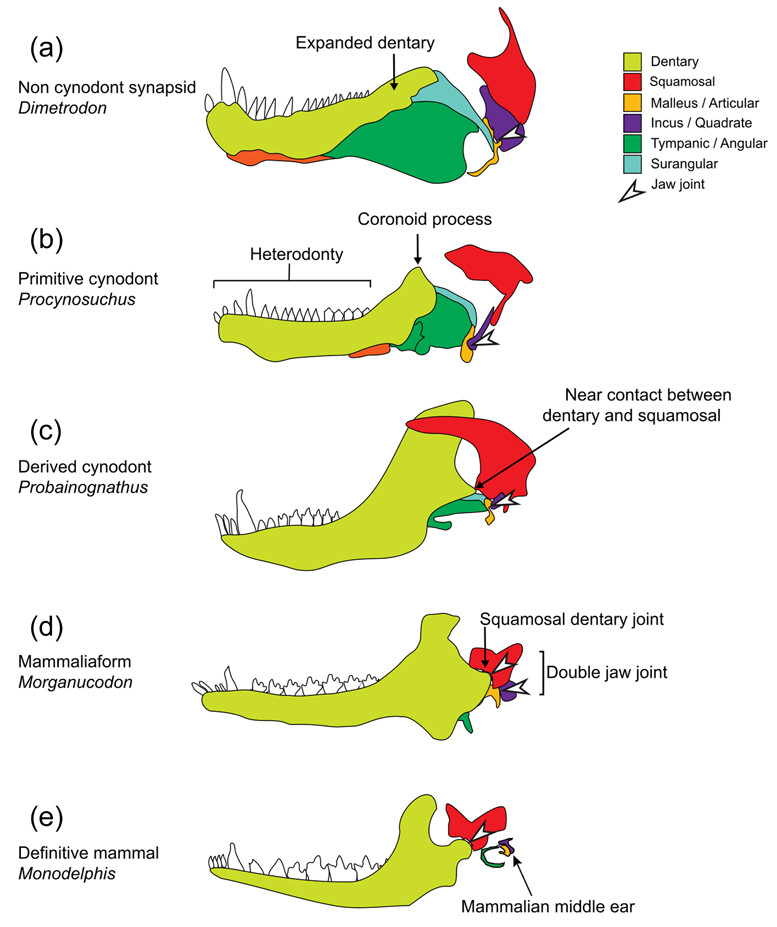
Diagram showing synapsid jaw evolution from early "pelycosaur" synapsids to modern mammals

Like their reptilian counterparts, the lower jaws of most non-mammalian synapsids were made up of several major bones including the dentary (the tooth-bearing bone), as well as the articular, angular, surangular and splenial. In cynodonts, these jaw bones other than the dentary became reduced in size and either lost or, in the case of the angular and articular, gradually moved into forming bones of the ear. While modern mammals possess the malleus, incus, tympanic, and stapes, basal synapsids (like all other tetrapods) possess only a stapes. The malleus is derived from the articular and the tympanic (also widely known as the ectotympanic) is derived from the angular bones, while the incus is derived from the quadrate (a cranial bone).

Mammalian jaw structures are also set apart by the dentary-squamosal jaw joint. In this form of jaw joint, the dentary forms a connection with a depression in the squamosal known as the glenoid fossa. In contrast, all other jawed vertebrates, including reptiles and non-cynodont synapsids, possess a jaw joint in which one of the smaller bones of the lower jaw, the articular, makes a connection with a bone of the cranium called the quadrate bone to form the articular-quadrate jaw joint. Non-mammalian cynodonts show articulations transitional between these two conditions.

=== Palate ===
Synapsids ancestrally possess palatal teeth present on the bones of the roof of the mouth. These were lost in the cynodont ancestors of mammals.

Over time, as synapsids became more mammalian and less 'reptilian', they began to develop a secondary palate, separating the mouth and nasal cavity. In early synapsids, a secondary palate began to form on the sides of the maxilla, still leaving the mouth and nostril connected.

Eventually, the two sides of the palate began to curve together, forming a U shape instead of a C shape. The palate also began to extend back toward the throat, securing the entire mouth and creating a full palatine bone. The maxilla is also closed completely. In fossils of one of the first eutheriodonts, the beginnings of a palate are clearly visible. The later Thrinaxodon has a full and completely closed palate, forming a clear progression.

=== Skin and fur ===
In addition to the glandular skin covered in fur found in most modern mammals, modern and extinct synapsids possess a variety of modified skin coverings, including osteoderms (bony armor embedded in the skin), scutes (protective structures of the dermis often with a horny covering), hair or fur, and scale-like structures (often formed from modified hair, as in pangolins and some rodents). While the skin of reptiles is rather thin, that of mammals has a thick dermal layer.

Although the nature of early synapsid skin was previously ambiguous, it has now been conclusively shown that early "pelycosaur" synapsids were covered in epidermal scales similar to those of reptiles based on skin impressions found in the Early Permian of Europe (with the bodies of at least some sphenacodontids having rectangular scales on the underside of the body while their limbs were covered in hexagonal scales). It has been suggested that epidermal scales evolved in their common ancestor prior to the split between reptiles and synapsids.

Mummified foot of the dicynodont therapsid Lystrosaurus from the Karoo of South Africa, showing warty skin texture

It is currently unknown exactly when mammalian characteristics such as body hair and mammary glands first appeared, as the fossils only rarely provide direct evidence for soft tissues. The only unambiguous skin impressions known from non-cynodont therapsids are those of the dinocephalian Estemmenosuchus from the Middle Permian of Russia and the dicynodont Lystrosaurus from the Early Triassic of South Africa, which both exhibit "bulging ellipsoid tubercules with a tendency to partially protrude one another, producing an overall pustular surface texture". Hair-like structures in Late Permian coprolites from Russia and possibly South Africa may suggest that some therapsids had possibly acquired hair by this time, though the nature of these structures is ambiguous.

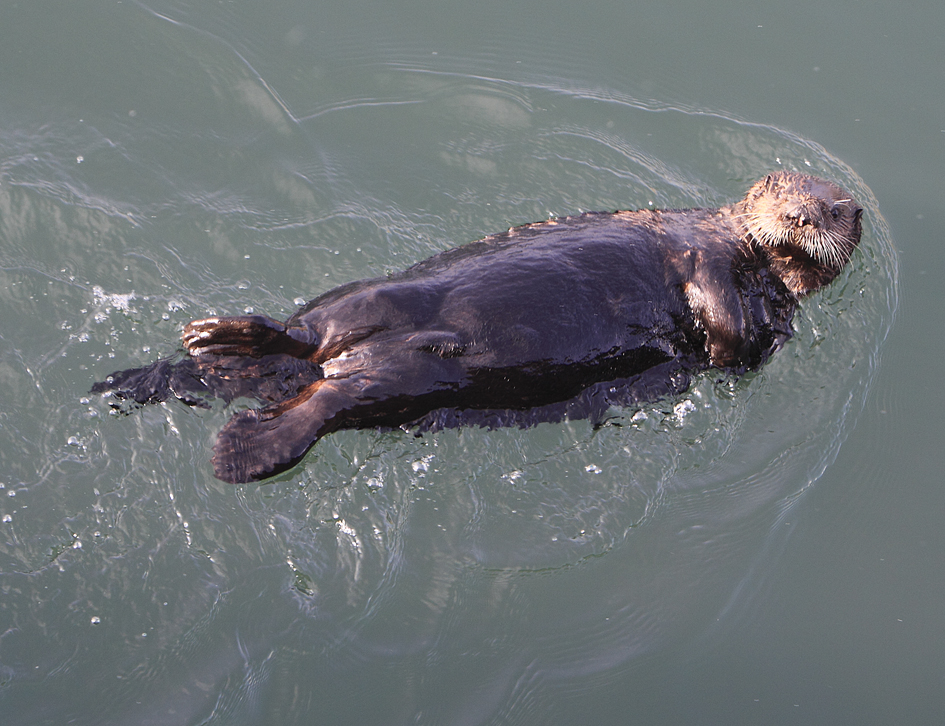
The sea otter has the densest fur of modern mammals.

Whiskers are suggested to have first evolved in cynodonts belonging to the clade Prozostrodontia based on their skull anatomy. The oldest known fossil showing unambiguous imprints of hair is the Callovian (late middle Jurassic) Castorocauda and several contemporary haramiyidans, both non-mammalian mammaliaform (see below, however). More primitive members of the Cynodontia are also hypothesized to have had fur or a fur-like covering based on their inferred warm-blooded metabolism. While more direct evidence of fur in early cynodonts has been proposed in the form of small pits on the snout possibly associated with whiskers, such pits are also found in some reptiles that lack whiskers. There is evidence that some other non-mammalian cynodonts more basal than Castorocauda, such as Morganucodon, had Harderian glands, which are associated with the grooming and maintenance of fur. The apparent absence of these glands in non-mammaliaformes may suggest that fur did not originate until that point in synapsid evolution. It is possible that fur and associated features of true warm-bloodedness did not appear until some synapsids became extremely small and nocturnal, necessitating a higher metabolism. Mutation of the MSX2 gene in mice shows that when the gene is made non-functional, the mice fail to develop a hair coat, and the pineal foramen, which is ancestrally closed in mammals, becomes open. This may suggest that the two developments occurred around the same time in the cynodont ancestors of mammals.

==== Patagia ====
Aerial locomotion first began in non-mammalian haramiyidan cynodonts, with Arboroharamiya, Xianshou, Maiopatagium and Vilevolodon bearing exquisitely preserved, fur-covered wing membranes that stretch across the limbs and tail. Their fingers are elongated, similar to those of bats and colugos and likely sharing similar roles both as wing supports and to hang on tree branches.

Within true mammals, aerial locomotion first occurs in volaticotherian eutriconodonts. A fossil Volaticotherium has an exquisitely preserved furry patagium with delicate wrinkles and that is very extensive, "sandwiching" the poorly preserved hands and feet and extending to the base of the tail. Argentoconodon, a close relative, shares a similar femur adapted for flight stresses, indicating a similar lifestyle.

Therian mammals would only achieve powered flight and gliding long after these early aeronauts became extinct, with the earliest-known gliding metatherians and bats evolving in the Paleocene.

=== Orifices, reproduction and mammary glands ===
Like other tetrapods, synapsids ancestrally had a cloaca (a single opening for defecation, urination and reproduction) on the underside of the base of the tail, which in the case of basal synapsids (as indicated by a preserved cloacal impression likely of a caseid from the Early Permian of Germany) faced directly downwards. A single cloacal opening is retained by monotremes. In marsupials and some placentals, the anus is separated from the unified reproductive-urination opening (the urogenital sinus, also sometimes still called a cloaca) by the urorectal septum. In many placentals, the urination opening (urethral meatus) is also separate from the reproductive opening, with the anus separated from the urinary and reproductive organs by the perineum. Like many other tetrapods, male mammals possess penises. Their penises are likely homologous to those of other amniotes, representing a shared ancestral trait inherited from their common ancestor, as is also suggested for the female homologue of the penis, the clitoris.

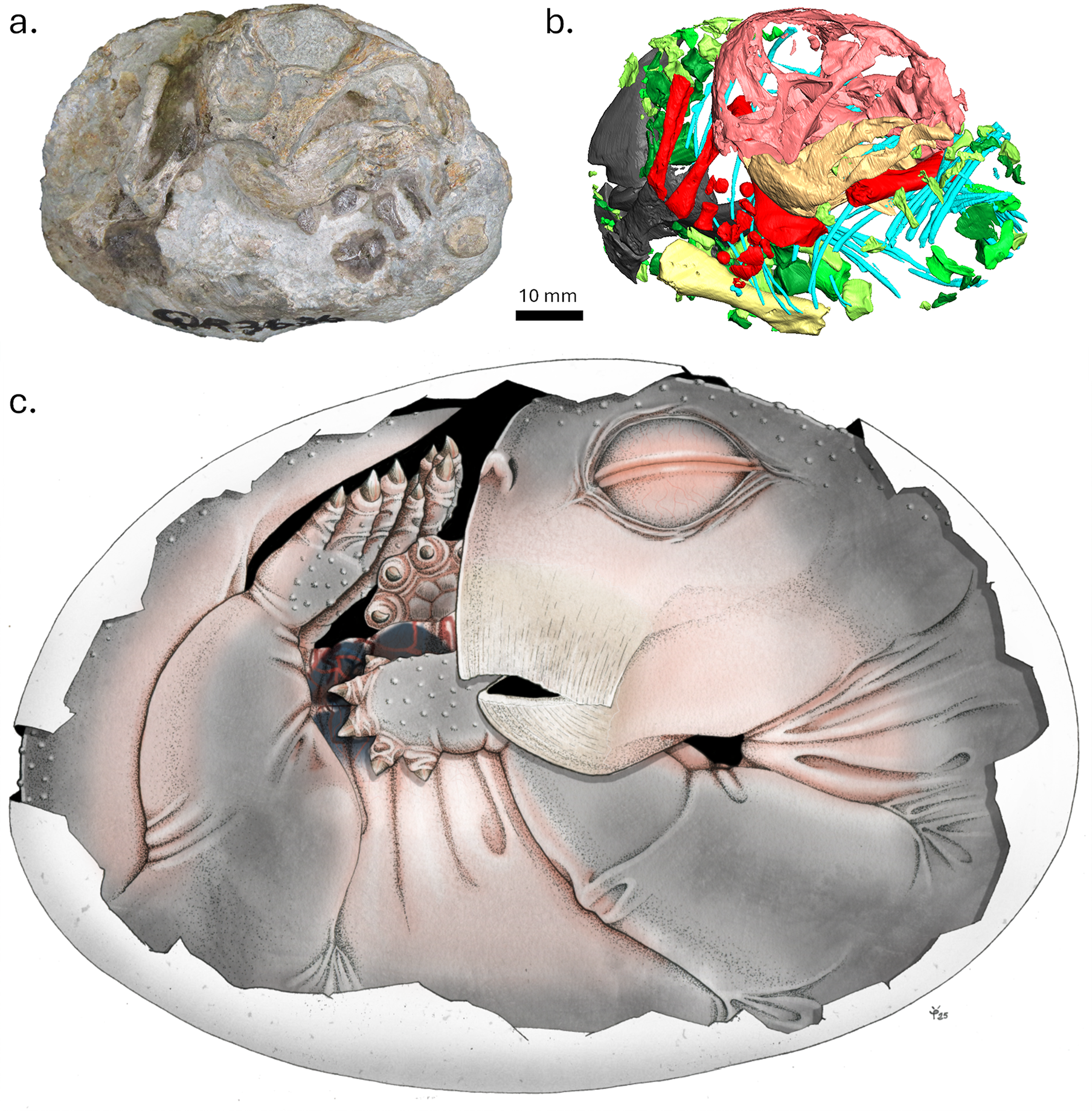
Preserved embryo of dicynodont therapsid Lystrosaurus from the Early Triassic of South Africa, with life restoration showing embryo curled up in inferred (but unpreserved) egg

Most or all non-mammalian synapsids may have laid relatively soft leathery eggs similar to those of monotremes, which lack a relatively thick hard calcified shell like those found in many modern reptile and bird eggs. This may also explain why there is no fossil evidence for synapsid eggshells to date. Egg laying in non-mammalian synapsids has seemingly been confirmed by a tightly coiled embryo of the dicynodont therapsid Lystrosaurus found in the Early Triassic of South Africa which was likely laid in an (unpreserved) soft leathery egg. Because they were vulnerable to desiccation, secretions from apocrine-like glands may have helped keep the eggs moist.

According to Oftedal, early synapsids may have buried their eggs in moist soil, hydrating them with contact with the moist skin, or may have carried them in a moist pouch, similar to that of monotremes (echidnas carry their eggs and offspring via a temporary pouch), though this would limit the mobility of the parent. The latter may have been the primitive form of egg care in synapsids rather than simply burying the eggs, and the constraint on the parent's mobility would have been solved by having the eggs "parked" in nests during foraging or other activities and periodically be hydrated, allowing higher clutch sizes than could fit inside a pouch (or pouches) at once, and large eggs, which would be cumbersome to carry in a pouch, would be easier to care for. The basis of Oftedal's speculation is the fact that many species of anurans can carry eggs or tadpoles attached to the skin, or embedded within cutaneous "pouches" and how most salamanders curl around their eggs to keep them moist, both groups also having glandular skin. The relatively large size of the eggs of Lystrosaurus suggests that dicynodonts and probably by extension other non cynodont synapsids had enough yolk in their eggs to develop sufficiently without the use of milk, suggesting that they lacked it.

The glands involved in this mechanism would later evolve into true mammary glands with multiple modes of secretion in association with hair follicles. Comparative analyses of the evolutionary origin of milk constituents support a scenario in which the secretions from these glands evolved into a complex, nutrient-rich milk long before true mammals arose (with some of the constituents possibly predating the split between the synapsid and sauropsid lines). Cynodonts were almost certainly able to produce this, which allowed a progressive decline of yolk mass and thus egg size, resulting in increasingly altricial hatchlings as milk became the primary source of nutrition, which is all evidenced by the small body size, the presence of epipubic bones, and limited tooth replacement in advanced cynodonts, as well as in mammaliaforms.

=== Metabolism and activity cycle ===
It has been disputed when endothermy arose in the synapsid lineage. Some propose that it arose in the common ancestor of synapsids, others that endothermy is only present in members of Therapsida (perhaps with separate origins in dicynodonts and cynodonts), and that synapsids are ancestrally ectothermic like reptiles.

Based on the size of the eye sockets and the scleral ring, some non-mammalian synapsids were likely diurnal (active during the day), while others are likely to have been nocturnal.

== Evolutionary history ==
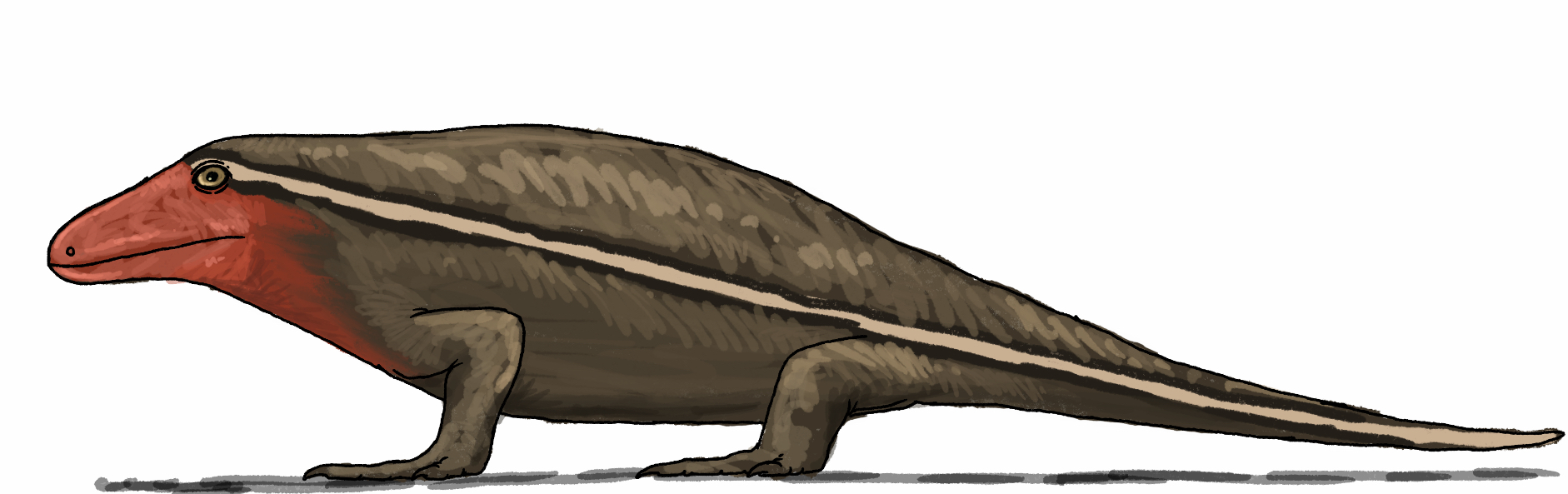
Archaeothyris, one of the oldest synapsids found

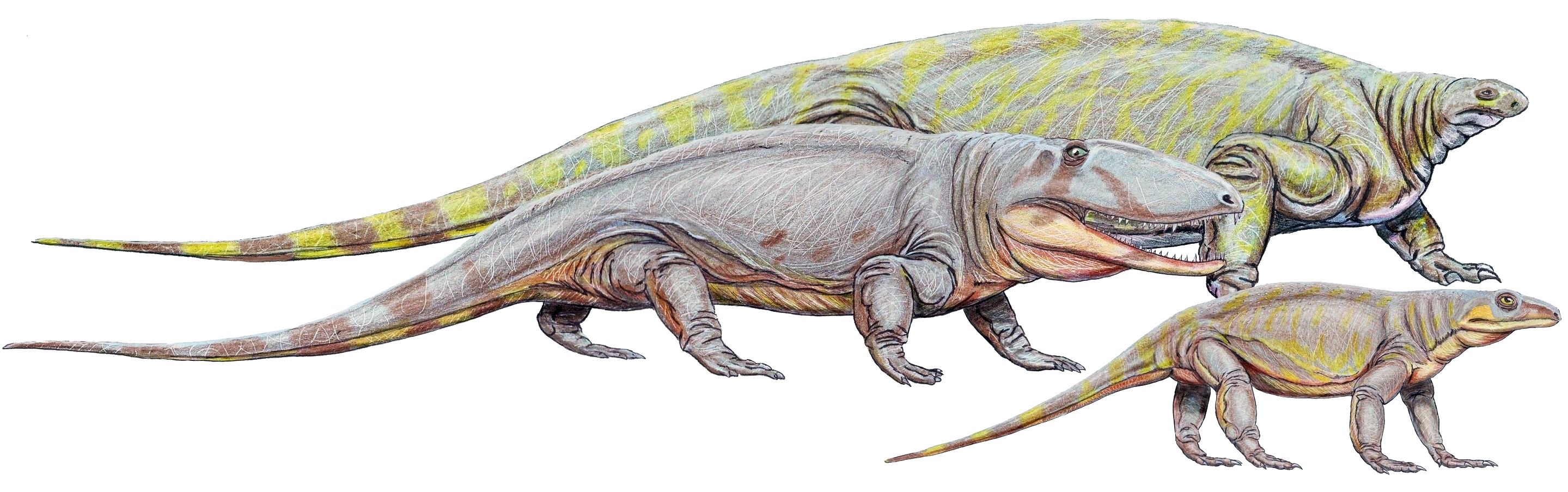
Cotylorhynchus (background), Ophiacodon and Varanops were early synapsids that lived until the Early Permian.

Over the course of synapsid evolution, progenitor taxa at the start of adaptive radiations have tended to be derived carnivores. Synapsid adaptive radiations have generally occurred after extinction events that depleted the biosphere and left vacant niches open to be filled by newly evolved taxa. In non-mammaliaform synapsids, those taxa that gave rise to rapidly diversifying lineages have been both small and large in body size, although after the Late Triassic, progenitors of new synapsid lineages have generally been small, unspecialised generalists.

The earliest unambiguous synapsids are known from the Moscovian stage of the Late Carboniferous, around 315-307 million years ago, known from both North America and Europe including Archaeothyris and Echinerpeton (both ophiaconodontids), as well as Dendromaia (a varanopid), though ambiguous possible older Bashkirian (~315–320 million years ago) fossils are known from Joggins Formation of Canada. The early "pelycosaurian" synapsids spread and diversified, becoming dominant land predators and the largest terrestrial animals in the latest Carboniferous and Early Permian periods, ranging up to 6 metres (20 ft) in length. They were sprawling, bulky, possibly cold-blooded, and had small brains. Some, such as Dimetrodon, had large sails that might have helped raise their body temperature. A few relict groups lasted into the later Permian but, by the middle of the Late Permian, all had either died off or evolved into their successors, the therapsids.

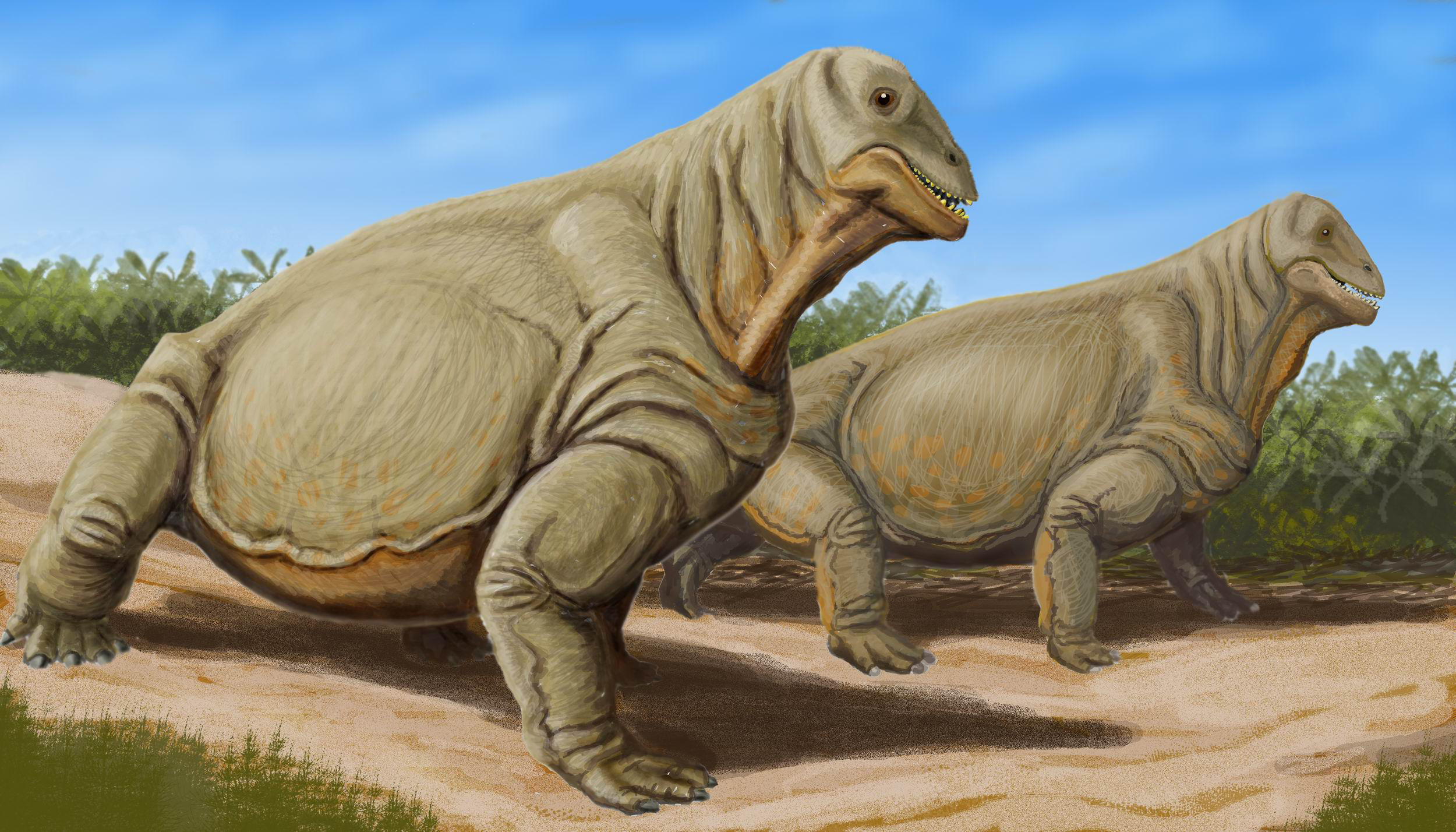
Moschops is a herbivorous dinocephalian therapsid from the Middle Permian of South Africa.

The therapsids, a more advanced group of synapsids, appeared during the Middle Permian and included the largest terrestrial animals in the Middle and Late Permian. They included herbivores and carnivores, ranging from small animals the size of a rat (e.g.: Robertia), to large, bulky herbivores a ton or more in weight (e.g.: Moschops). After flourishing for many millions of years, these successful animals were all but wiped out by the Permian–Triassic mass extinction about 250 mya, the largest known extinction in Earth's history, possibly related to the Siberian Traps volcanic event. Only a few therapsids went on to be successful in the new early Triassic landscape; they include Lystrosaurus and Cynognathus, the latter of which appeared later in the Early Triassic. However, they were accompanied by the early archosaurs (soon to give rise to the dinosaurs), which took over the dominant niches after the Smithian-Spathian boundary event. Some of these archosaurs, such as Euparkeria, were small and lightly built, while others, such as Erythrosuchus, were as big as or bigger than the largest therapsids.

Life restoration of Dinodontosaurus, a large Triassic herbivorous dicynodont therapsid

After the Permian extinction, the synapsids did not count more than three surviving clades. The first comprised the therocephalians, which only lasted the first 20 million years of the Triassic period. The second were specialised, beaked herbivores known as dicynodonts (such as the Kannemeyeriidae), which contained some members that reached large size (up to a tonne or more). And finally there were the increasingly mammal-like carnivorous, herbivorous, and insectivorous cynodonts, including the eucynodonts from the Olenekian age, an early representative of which was Cynognathus.

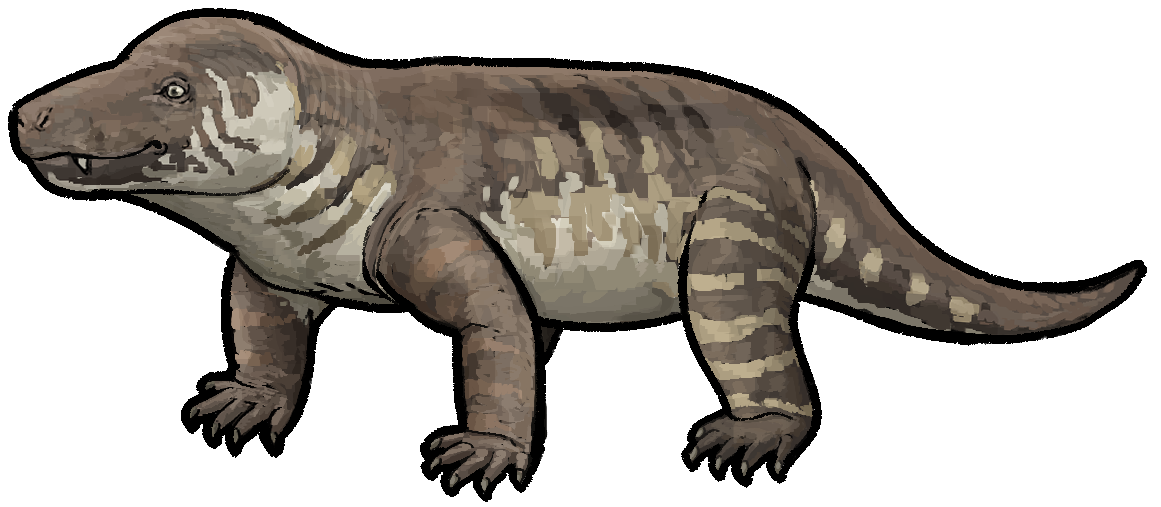
Cynognathus was the largest predatory cynodont of the Triassic.

Unlike the dicynodonts, which were large, the cynodonts became progressively smaller and more mammal-like as the Triassic progressed, though some forms like Trucidocynodon remained large. The first mammaliaforms evolved from the cynodonts during the early Norian age of the Late Triassic, about 225 mya.

During the evolutionary succession from early therapsid to cynodont to eucynodont to mammal, the main lower jaw bone, the dentary, replaced the adjacent bones. Thus, the lower jaw gradually became just one large bone, with several of the smaller jaw bones migrating into the inner ear and allowing sophisticated hearing.

Triassic and Jurassic ancestors of living mammals, along with their close relatives, had high metabolic rates. This meant consuming food (generally thought to be insects) in much greater quantity. To facilitate rapid digestion, these synapsids evolved mastication (chewing) and specialized teeth that aided chewing. Limbs also evolved to move under the body instead of to the side, allowing them to breathe more efficiently during locomotion. This helped make it possible to support their higher metabolic demands.

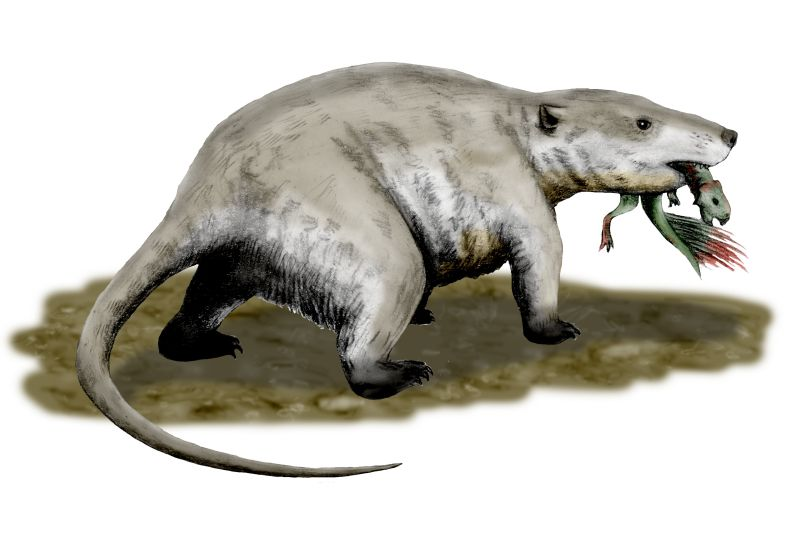
Repenomamus was the largest mammal of the Mesozoic.

Whether through climate change, vegetation change, ecological competition, or a combination of factors, most of the remaining large cynodonts (belonging to the Traversodontidae) and dicynodonts (of the family Kannemeyeriidae) had disappeared by the Rhaetian age, even before the Triassic–Jurassic extinction event that killed off most of the large non-dinosaurian archosaurs. The remaining Mesozoic synapsids were small, ranging from the size of a shrew to the badger-like mammal Repenomamus.

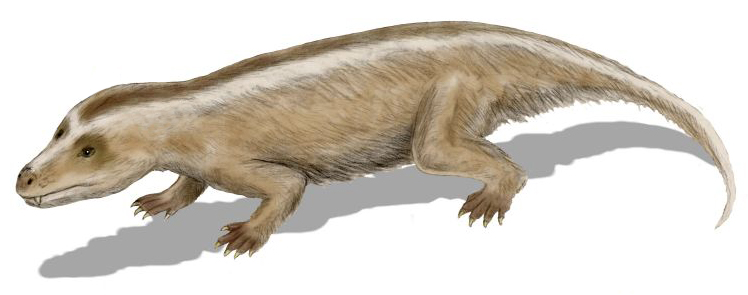
Tritylodon was a cynodont that lived in the Early Jurassic.

During the Jurassic and Cretaceous, the remaining non-mammalian cynodonts were small, such as Tritylodon. No cynodont grew larger than a cat. Most Jurassic and Cretaceous cynodonts were herbivorous, though some were carnivorous. The family Tritheledontidae, which first appeared near the end of the Triassic, was carnivorous and persisted well into the Middle Jurassic. The other, Tritylodontidae, first appeared at the same time as the tritheledonts, but was herbivorous. This group became extinct at the end of the Early Cretaceous epoch. Dicynodonts are generally thought to have become extinct near the end of the Triassic period, but there was evidence this group survived, in the form of six fragments of fossil bone that were found in Cretaceous rocks of Queensland, Australia. If true, it would mean there is a significant ghost lineage of Dicynodonts in Gondwana. However, these fossils were re-described in 2019 as being Pleistocene in age, and possibly belonging to a diprotodontid marsupial.

Today, the 5,500 species of living synapsids, known as the mammals, include both aquatic (cetaceans) and flying (bats) species, and the largest animal ever known to have existed (the blue whale). Humans are synapsids, as well. Most mammals are viviparous and give birth to live young rather than laying eggs with the exception being the monotremes.

== Relationships ==
Below is a cladogram of the most commonly accepted phylogeny of synapsids, showing a long stem lineage including Mammalia and successively more basal clades such as Theriodontia, Therapsida and Sphenacodontia:

- Synapsida
  - †Caseasauria
  - Eupelycosauria
    - †Varanopidae
    - - †Ophiacodontidae
      - - †Edaphosauridae
        - Sphenacodontia
          - †Sphenacodontidae
          - Therapsida
            - †Biarmosuchia
            - Eutherapsida
              - †Dinocephalia
              - Neotherapsida
                - †Anomodontia
                - Theriodontia
                  - †Gorgonopsia
                  - Eutheriodontia
                    - †Therocephalia
                    - Cynodontia
                      - †Cynognathia
                      - Probainognathia
                        - Mammalia

Most uncertainty in the phylogeny of synapsids lies among the earliest members of the group, including forms traditionally placed within Pelycosauria. As one of the earliest phylogenetic analyses, Brinkman & Eberth (1983) placed the family Varanopidae with Caseasauria as the most basal offshoot of the synapsid lineage. Reisz (1986) removed Varanopidae from Caseasauria, placing it in a more derived position on the stem. While most analyses find Caseasauria to be the most basal synapsid clade, Benson's analysis (2012) placed a clade containing Ophiacodontidae and Varanopidae as the most basal synapsids, with Caseasauria occupying a more derived position. Benson attributed this revised phylogeny to the inclusion of postcranial characteristics, or features of the skeleton other than the skull, in his analysis. When only cranial or skull features were included, Caseasauria remained the most basal synapsid clade. Below is a cladogram modified from Benson's analysis (2012):

- - Tseajaia campi
  - Limnoscelis paludis
  - Amniota
    - - Captorhinus spp.
      - Protorothyris archeri
    - Synapsida
      - - Ophiacodontidae
          - Archaeothyris florensis
          - - Varanosaurus acutirostris
            - - Ophiacodon spp.
              - Stereophallodon ciscoensis
        - Varanopidae
          - Archaeovenator hamiltonensis
          - - Pyozia mesenensis
            - - - Mycterosaurus longiceps
                - - ?Elliotsmithia longiceps (BP/1/5678)
                  - Heleosaurus scholtzi
                  - Mesenosaurus romeri
              - - - Varanops brevirostris
                  - - Watongia meieri
                    - Varanodon agilis
                - - Ruthiromia elcobriensis
                  - - Aerosaurus wellesi
                    - Aerosaurus greenleorum
      - - Caseasauria
          - Eothyrididae
            - Eothyris parkeyi
            - Oedaleops campi
          - Caseidae
            - Oromycter dolesorum
            - - Casea broilii
              - - Trichasaurus texensis
                - - Euromycter rutenus (="Casea" rutena)
                  - - Ennatosaurus tecton
                    - - Angelosaurus romeri
                      - - Cotylorhynchus romeri
                        - - Cotylorhynchus bransoni
                          - Cotylorhynchus hancocki
        - - Ianthodon schultzei
          - - Edaphosauridae
              - Ianthasaurus hardestiorum
              - - Glaucosaurus megalops
                - Lupeosaurus kayi
                - - Edaphosaurus boanerges
                  - Edaphosaurus novomexicanus
            - Sphenacodontia
              - Haptodus garnettensis
              - - Pantelosaurus saxonicus
                - - Therapsida
                    - Raranimus dashankouensis
                    - - Biarmosuchus tener
                      - - Biseridens qilianicus
                        - Titanophoneus potens
                  - Sphenacodontidae
                    - Cutleria wilmarthi
                    - - Secodontosaurus obtusidens
                      - - Cryptovenator hirschbergeri
                        - - Dimetrodon spp.
                          - Sphenacodon spp.

However, more recent examination of the phylogeny of basal synapsids, incorporating newly described basal caseids and eothyridids, returned Caseasauria to its position as the sister to all other synapsids. Brocklehurst et al. (2016) demonstrated that many of the postcranial characters used by Benson (2012) to unite Caseasauria with Sphenacodontidae and Edaphosauridae were absent in the newly discovered postcranial material of eothyridids, and were therefore acquired convergently.

== See also ==
- Euryapsida – Group of extinct reptiles
- List of prehistoric mammals
- Lists of synapsids
- Mammal classification – Taxonomy of mammals
- Timeline of the evolutionary history of life
- Vertebrate paleontology – Scientific study of prehistoric vertebrates
