= List of Chinese geological formations =

== Quaternary ==
=== Pleistocene ===
- Abag Formation
- A’ershan Formation

== Paleogene ==
=== Paleocene ===
- A’ertashi Formation

== Cretaceous ==
- A’ergong Formation

=== Early (Lower) ===
- Dabeigou Formation
- Jianxing Formation
- Jiufotang Formation
- Tuchengzi Formation
- Xiagou Formation
- Yijinholuo Formation
- Yixian Formation

== Jurassic ==
=== Late (Upper) ===
- Shaximiao Formation
- Suining Formation
- Tiaojishan Formation

=== Middle ===
- Ah Formation
- Haifanggou Formation

=== Early (Lower) ===
- Lufeng Formation

== Triassic ==
=== Late (Upper) ===
- Adula Formation

=== Early (Lower) ===
- Aba Formation
- Zuosuo Formation

== Permian ==
=== Late ===
- Zuozuo Formation

=== Early ===
- A’erbasayi Formation
- A’ertushileike Formation
- Beipiao Formation

== Carboniferous ==
=== Late ===
- Jianshanying Formation

== Devonian ==
=== Middle ===
- A’ermantie Formation

=== Early (Lower) ===
- A’ertaxi Formation
- Xikeng Formation

== Silurian ==
=== Late ===
- Xikeng Formation
- Zusailing Formation

== Cambrian ==
=== Middle ===
- Abuqiehai Formation
- Zushimiao Formation
- Wulongqing Formation
- Chiungchussu Formation

=== Early (Lower) ===
- Kuanchuanpu Formation
- Yanjiahe Formation

== Proterozoic ==
=== Neoproterozoic ===
- Abor Formation
- Lantian Formation
- Doushantuo Formation

=== Mesoproterozoic ===
- Gaoyuzhuang Formation
- Tuanshanzi Formation

=== Paleoproterozoic ===
- Chuanlinggou Formation
- A’ertenghala Formation
- Xiheli Formation

== Archean ==
=== Neoarchean ===
- Xihui Formation
