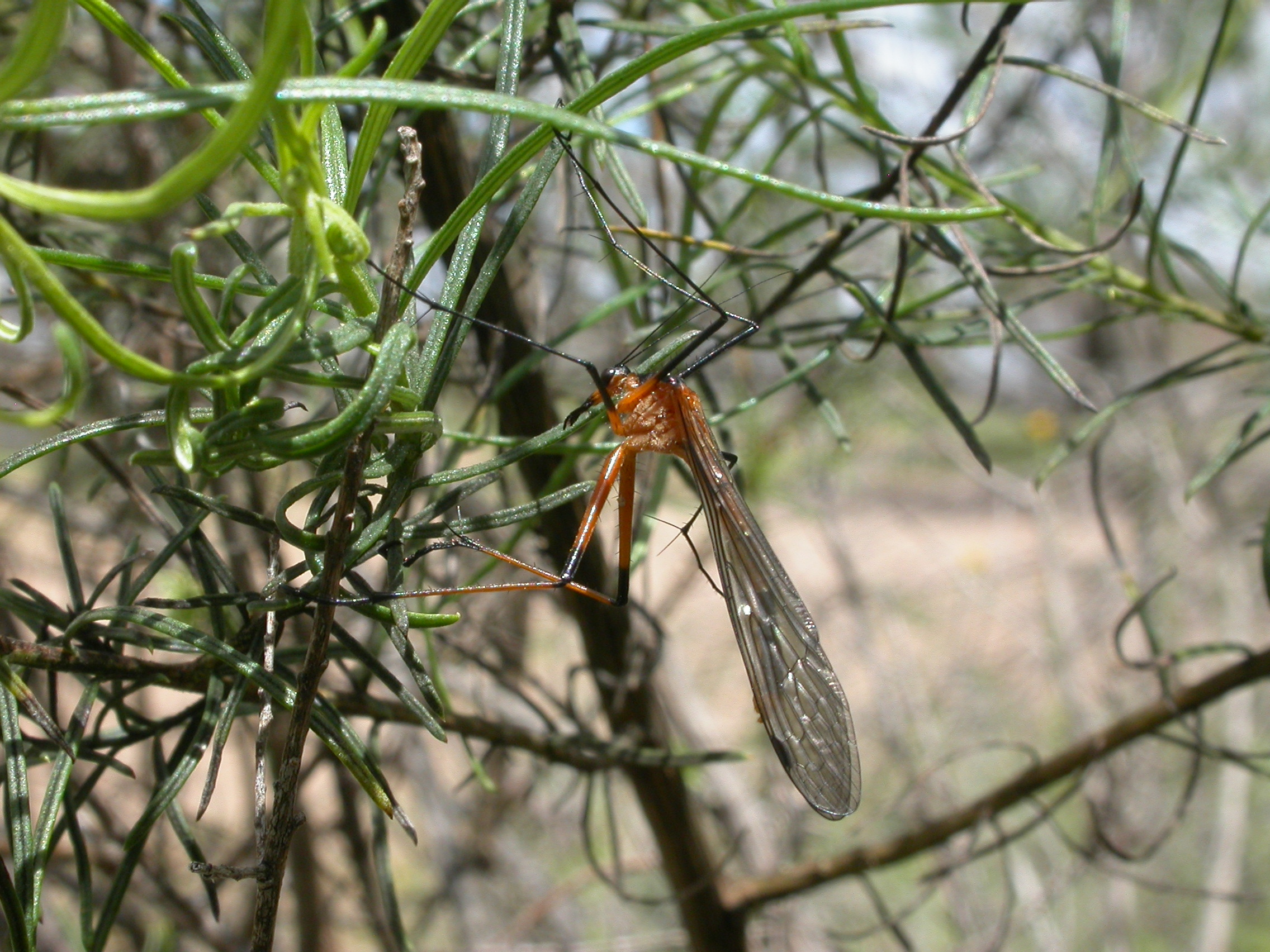

Scientific classification
- Kingdom: Animalia
- Phylum: Arthropoda
- Clade: Pancrustacea
- Class: Insecta
- Order: Mecoptera
- Family: Bittacidae
- Genus: Harpobittacus
- Species: H. australis

Binomial name
- Harpobittacus australis Klug, 1838

= Harpobittacus australis =

Species of insect

Harpobittacus australis is an Australian species of hangingfly in the family Bittacidae found in the southern states of New South Wales, Victoria, South Australia and Tasmania . Males hang on vegetation with their front legs, using their hindlegs to catch passing insects.

The black and orange body is up to 2 cm long, with long claws at the end of the legs.
