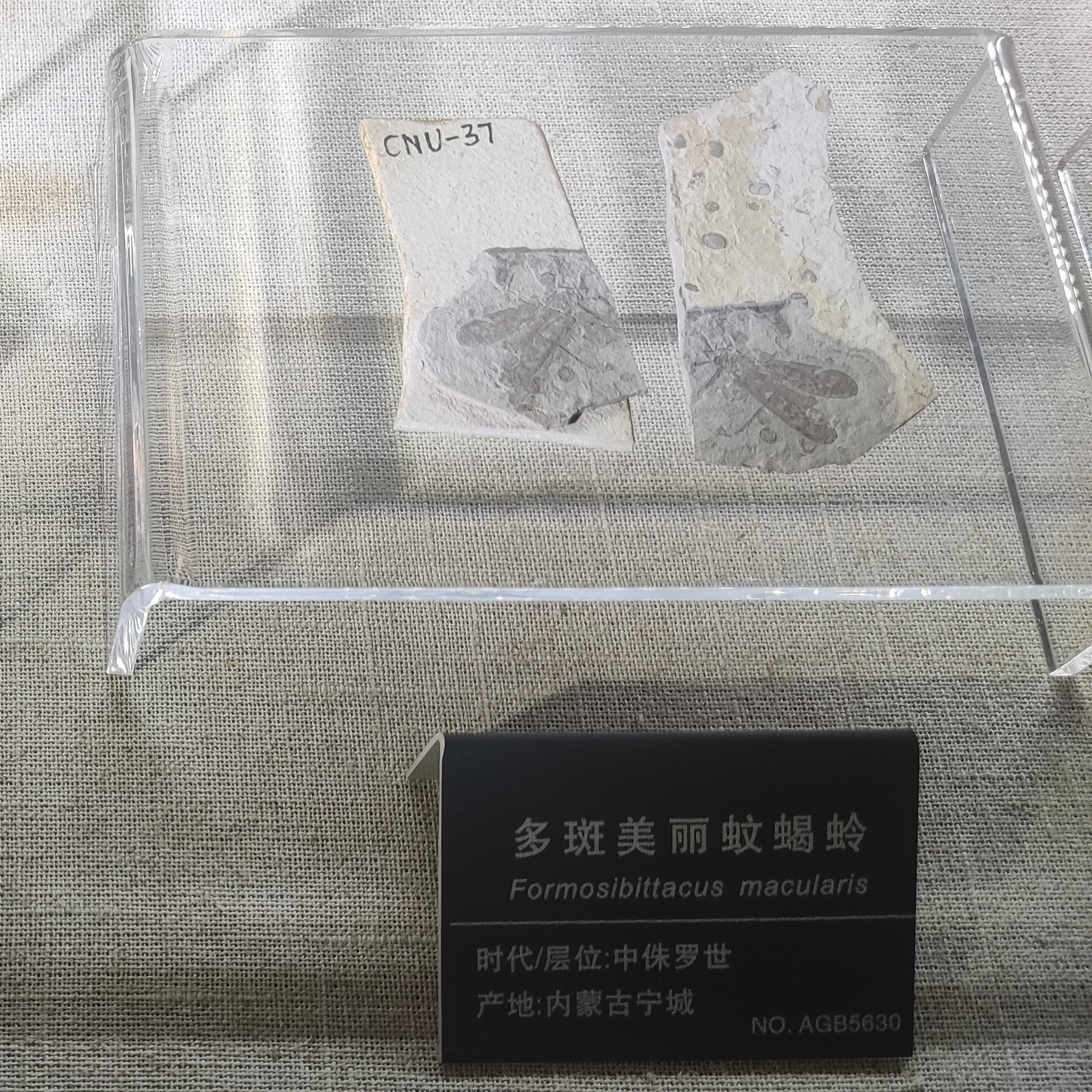

Scientific classification
- Kingdom: Animalia
- Phylum: Arthropoda
- Class: Insecta
- Order: Mecoptera
- Family: Bittacidae
- Genus: †Formosibittacus
- Species: †F. macularis

Binomial name
- †Formosibittacus macularis Li, Ren & Shih, 2008

= Formosibittacus =

Formosibittacus Temporal range: Middle Jurassic, 165 Ma

Extinct genus of insects

Formosibittacus is an extinct genus of hangingfly in the family Bittacidae and containing a single species Formosibittacus macularis. The species is known only from the Middle Jurassic Jiulongshan Formation, part of the Daohugou Beds, near the village of Daohugou in Ningcheng County, northeastern China.

== History and classification ==
Formosibittacus macularis is known only from one fossil, the holotype, specimen numbers "CNU-M-NN2007001-1" and "CNU-M-NN2007001-2" for the part and counterpart respectively. The specimen is composed of an almost complete specimen of unidentified sex and is preserved as a compression fossil in sedimentary rock. The fossil was recovered from outcrops of the Jiulongshan Formation exposed in the Wuhua Township by Fang Liang. The type specimen is currently preserved in the Key Lab of Insect Evolution & Environmental Changes collections housed in the Capital Normal University, located in Beijing, China. Formosibittacus was first studied by Yan-Li Li, Dong Ren and ChungKun Shih of the Capital Normal University. Their 2008 type description of the genus and species was published online and then in print in the journal Zootaxa. The generic name was coined by Li, Ren and Shih from a combination of the Latin "formos" meaning beautiful and the modern Bittacidae genus Bittacus to which Formosibittacus is related. The etymology of the specific epithet macularis is in reference to the numerous maculae which are present on the holotype wings.

Formosibittacus macularis is one of six genera of fossil Bittacidae to be described from China. Along with Formosibittacus, Mongolbittacus and Jurahylobittacus known from the Jiulongshan Formation, while Megabittacus and Sibirobittacus are from the Yixian Formation and Liaobittacus is from the Haifanggou Formation.

== Description ==
The holotype specimen is mostly complete with the apical sections of a single hindwing missing. The forewings and hindwings shows a clear pattern of mottled color pattering along the cross veins which would have been light and dark coloration in life. The forewings are 23 millimetres (0.91 in) long and the hindwings are 20 millimetres (0.79 in) long. The hindwings and forewings are very similar in shape and vein structure, only differing in a fusion of the 1A and CuP veins along with the 2A vein ending before the Rs starts in the hindwing. Overall the wings have a narrow base section widening to approximately 5 millimetres (0.20 in) along most of the length.
