= Mongolbittacus =

Mongolbittacus Temporal range: Middle Jurassic, 165 Ma

Scientific classification
- Domain: Eukaryota
- Kingdom: Animalia
- Phylum: Arthropoda
- Class: Insecta
- Order: Mecoptera
- Family: Bittacidae
- Genus: †Mongolbittacus
- Species: †M. daohugoensis

Binomial name
- †Mongolbittacus daohugoensis Petrulevicius, Huang & Ren, 2007

Extinct genus of insects

Mongolbittacus is an extinct genus of hangingfly in the family Bittacidae and containing a single species Mongolbittacus daohugoensis. The species is known only from the Middle Jurassic Jiulongshan Formation, part of the Daohugou Beds, near the village of Daohugou in Ningcheng County, northeastern China.

== History and classification ==
Mongolbittacus daohugoensis is known only from one fossil, the holotype, specimen number "NIGPAS 133709". The specimen is composed of an almost complete female specimen which is preserved as a two dimensional compression fossil in a well cemented calcareous grey siltstone. The fossil was recovered from outcrops of the Jiulongshan Formation exposed near Daohugou by Di-Ying Huang. The type specimen is currently preserved in the geology collections housed in the Nanjing Institute of Geology and Palaeontology, located in Nanjing, China. Mongolbittacus was first studied by Julián F. Petrulevicius of the Muséum national d'histoire naturelle in Paris, France, Di-Ying Huang of 2Nanjing Institute of Geology and Palaeontology, and Dong Ren of Capital Normal University in Beijing. Their 2007 type description of the genus and species was published in the journal African Invertebrates. The generic name was coined by Petrulevicius, Huang and Ren from a combination of "Mongol", a reference to the region of discovery; and the modern Bittacidae genus Bittacus to which Mongolbittacus is related. The etymology of the specific epithet daohugoensis is in reference type locality where the fossil preserved.

Mongolbittacus daohugoensis is one of six genera of fossil Bittacidae to be described from China. Along with Mongolbittacus, Jurahylobittacus and Formosibittacus are known from the Jiulongshan Formation, while Megabittacus and Sibirobittacus are from the Yixian Formation and Liaobittacus is from the Haifanggou Formation.

== Description ==
The holotype specimen is fully complete with only the apical section of one fore-wing missing, and small sections of the legs obscured. The fore and hind-wings of Mongolbittacus do not show any signs of color pattering unlike the genus Formosibittacus alongside which it lived. Also unlike Formosibittacus the wings of M. daohugoensis do not have any maculae. The fore-wings are 11.1 millimetres (0.44 in) long and the hind-wings are 9.5 millimetres (0.37 in) long. Overall the wings of Mongolbittacus have a narrow base section widening to approximately 3 millimetres (0.12 in) along most of the length, while the body was 6.5 millimetres (0.26 in) in length. Mongolbittacus is noted as unusual due to the completeness of the specimen. Most fossil Bittacidae are known and described from isolated fragments, most notably single wings.
