= Bittacus stigmaterus =

Scientific classification
- Kingdom: Animalia
- Phylum: Arthropoda
- Clade: Pancrustacea
- Class: Insecta
- Order: Mecoptera
- Family: Bittacidae
- Genus: Bittacus
- Species: B. stigmaterus

Binomial name
- Bittacus stigmaterus Say, 1823

Species of insect

Bittacus stigmaterus is a species of hangingfly in the family Bittacidae. It is found in North America.
