= Bittacus texanus =

Scientific classification
- Domain: Eukaryota
- Kingdom: Animalia
- Phylum: Arthropoda
- Class: Insecta
- Order: Mecoptera
- Family: Bittacidae
- Genus: Bittacus
- Species: B. texanus

Binomial name
- Bittacus texanus Banks, 1908

Species of insect

Bittacus texanus is a species of hangingfly in the family Bittacidae. It is found in North America.
