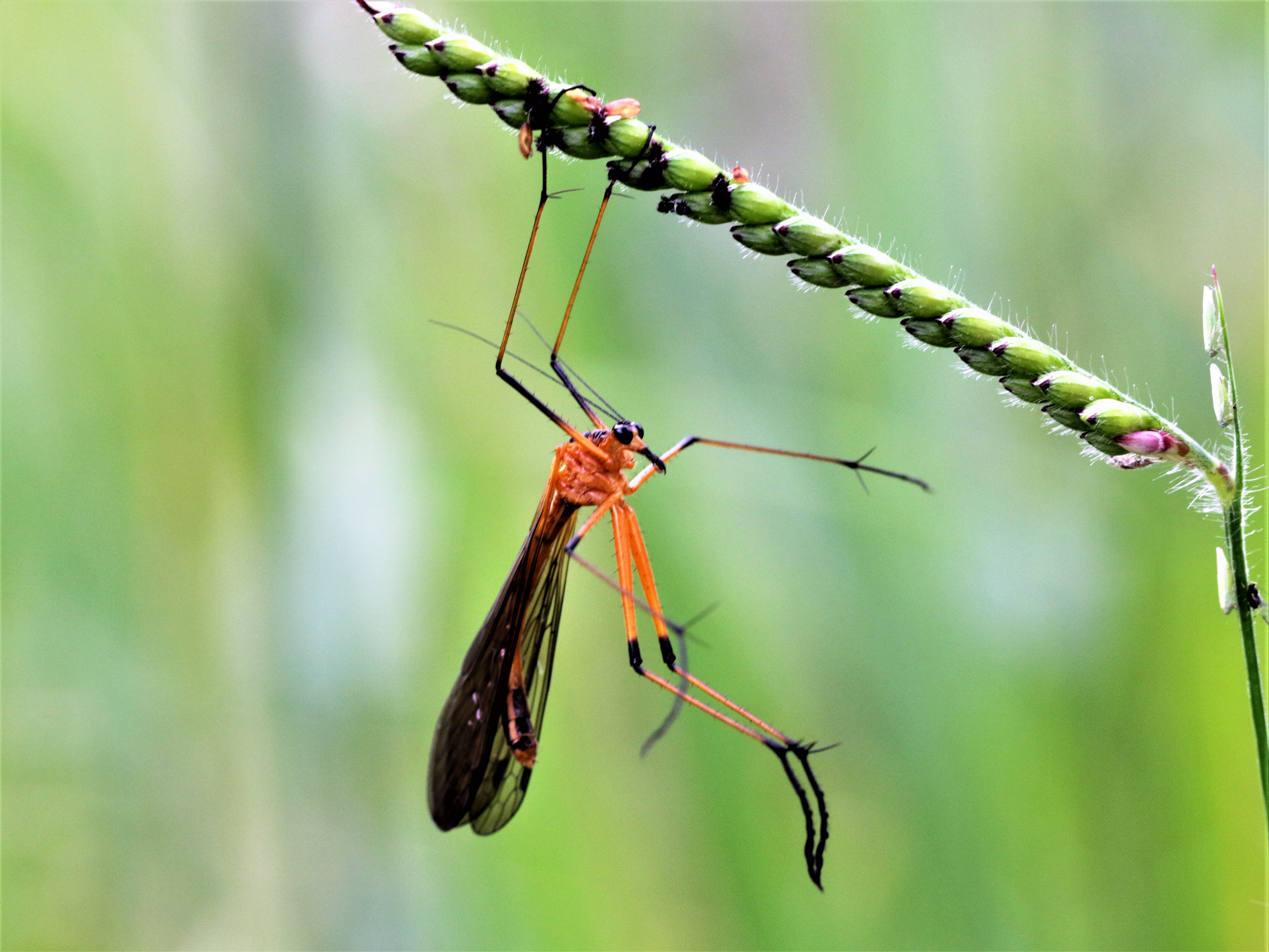

Scientific classification
- Kingdom: Animalia
- Phylum: Arthropoda
- Clade: Pancrustacea
- Class: Insecta
- Order: Mecoptera
- Family: Bittacidae
- Genus: Harpobittacus
- Species: H. septentrionis

Binomial name
- Harpobittacus septentrionis Lambkin, 1994

= Harpobittacus septentrionis =

Species of insect

Harpobittacus septentrionis is a species of hangingfly in the family Bittacidae found on the north-east coast of Australia.

== Description ==
Harpobittacus septentrionis is about 30mm in length, with a bright orange head and thorax. The abdomen is orange with black ventral and dorsal markings. The legs are orange, black at the joints and claws. It has two sets of membranous wings as distinct from a true fly which has one set.

== Distribution ==
Harpobittacus septentrionis has only been recorded on the ranges and adjacent inland in north-east Queensland from around Mackay to Cairns.

== Habit ==
Harpobittacus septentrionis hang from plants by the two forelegs, and capture prey using their hind and middle legs.
