= Bittacus punctiger =

Scientific classification
- Kingdom: Animalia
- Phylum: Arthropoda
- Class: Insecta
- Order: Mecoptera
- Family: Bittacidae
- Genus: Bittacus
- Species: B. punctiger

Binomial name
- Bittacus punctiger Westwood, 1846

Species of insect

Bittacus punctiger is a species of hangingfly in the family Bittacidae. It is found in North America.
