= Bittacus chlorostigma =

Scientific classification
- Domain: Eukaryota
- Kingdom: Animalia
- Phylum: Arthropoda
- Class: Insecta
- Order: Mecoptera
- Family: Bittacidae
- Genus: Bittacus
- Species: B. chlorostigma

Binomial name
- Bittacus chlorostigma MacLachlan, 1881

Species of insect

Bittacus chlorostigma is a species of hangingfly in the family Bittacidae. It is found in North America.
