= Bittacus carpenteri =

Scientific classification
- Domain: Eukaryota
- Kingdom: Animalia
- Phylum: Arthropoda
- Class: Insecta
- Order: Mecoptera
- Family: Bittacidae
- Genus: Bittacus
- Species: B. carpenteri

Binomial name
- Bittacus carpenteri Cheng, 1957

Species of insect

Bittacus carpenteri is a species of hanging fly in the Order Mecoptera. Its native range is the Sichuan Province of China. The specific epithet honors Professor Frank M. Carpenter.
