= Jurahylobittacus =

Jurahylobittacus Temporal range: Middle Jurassic, 165 Ma

Scientific classification
- Domain: Eukaryota
- Kingdom: Animalia
- Phylum: Arthropoda
- Class: Insecta
- Order: Mecoptera
- Family: Bittacidae
- Genus: †Jurahylobittacus
- Species: †J. astictus

Binomial name
- †Jurahylobittacus astictus Li, Ren & Shih, 2008

Extinct genus of insects

Jurahylobittacus is an extinct genus of hangingfly in the family Bittacidae and containing a single species Jurahylobittacus astictus. The species is known only from the Middle Jurassic Jiulongshan Formation, part of the Daohugou Beds, near the village of Daohugou in Ningcheng County, northeastern China.

== History and classification ==
Jurahylobittacus astictus is known only from one fossil, the holotype, specimen numbers "CNU-M-NN2007002-1" and "CNU-M-NN2007002-2" for the part and counterpart respectively. The specimen is composed of an almost complete specimen of unidentified sex and is preserved as a compression fossil in a sedimentary rock. The fossil was recovered from outcrops of the Jiulongshan Formation exposed in the Wuhua Township by Chung-Kun Shih. The type specimen is currently preserved in the Key Lab of Insect Evolution & Environmental Changes collections housed in the Capital Normal University, located in Beijing, China. Jurahylobittacus was first studied by Yan-Li Li, Dong Ren and ChungKun Shih of the Capital Normal University. Their 2008 type description of the genus and species was published online and then in print in the journal Zootaxa. The generic name was coined by Li, Ren and Shih from a combination of "Jura" a reference to the Jurassic; and the modern Bittacidae genus Hylobittacus to which Jurahylobittacus is related. The etymology of the specific epithet astictus is in reference to the lack of maculae present on any of the holotype specimens' wings.

Jurahylobittacus astictus is one of six genera of fossil Bittacidae to be described from China. Along with Jurahylobittacus, Mongolbittacus and Formosibittacus are known from the Jiulongshan Formation, while Megabittacus and Sibirobittacus are from the Yixian Formation and Liaobittacus is from the Haifanggou Formation.

== Description ==
The holotype specimen is fully complete with only the apical sections of the legs obscured. The fore and hind-wings of Jurahylobittacus do not show any signs color pattering unlike the genus Formosibittacus which it lived alongside. Also unlike Formosibittacus the wings of J. astictus do not have any maculae. The fore-wings are 12.6 millimetres (0.50 in) long and the hind-wings are 10.3 millimetres (0.41 in) long. The hind and forewings are generally similar in overall vein structure to the extinct Sibirobittacus and also to the modern Hylobittacus but can be distinguished from both by the finer venation details. Overall the wings of Jurahylobittacus have a narrow base section widening to approximately 3 millimetres (0.12 in) along most of the length, while the body was 18 millimetres (0.71 in) in length.
