= Abor =

Abor or ABOR may refer to:

- Abor, Enugu, a town in Ojebogene L.G.A., Enugu, Nigeria
- Abor, Ghana, a town in the Volta Region of Ghana
- Abor Hills, Arunāchal Pradesh
- Abor people (disambiguation), multiple uses
- Abor Formation, in the Siang district, Arunachal Pradesh, India
- Academic Bill of Rights, a US campaign for certain rights for students

== See also ==
- Abora
- Arbor (disambiguation)
