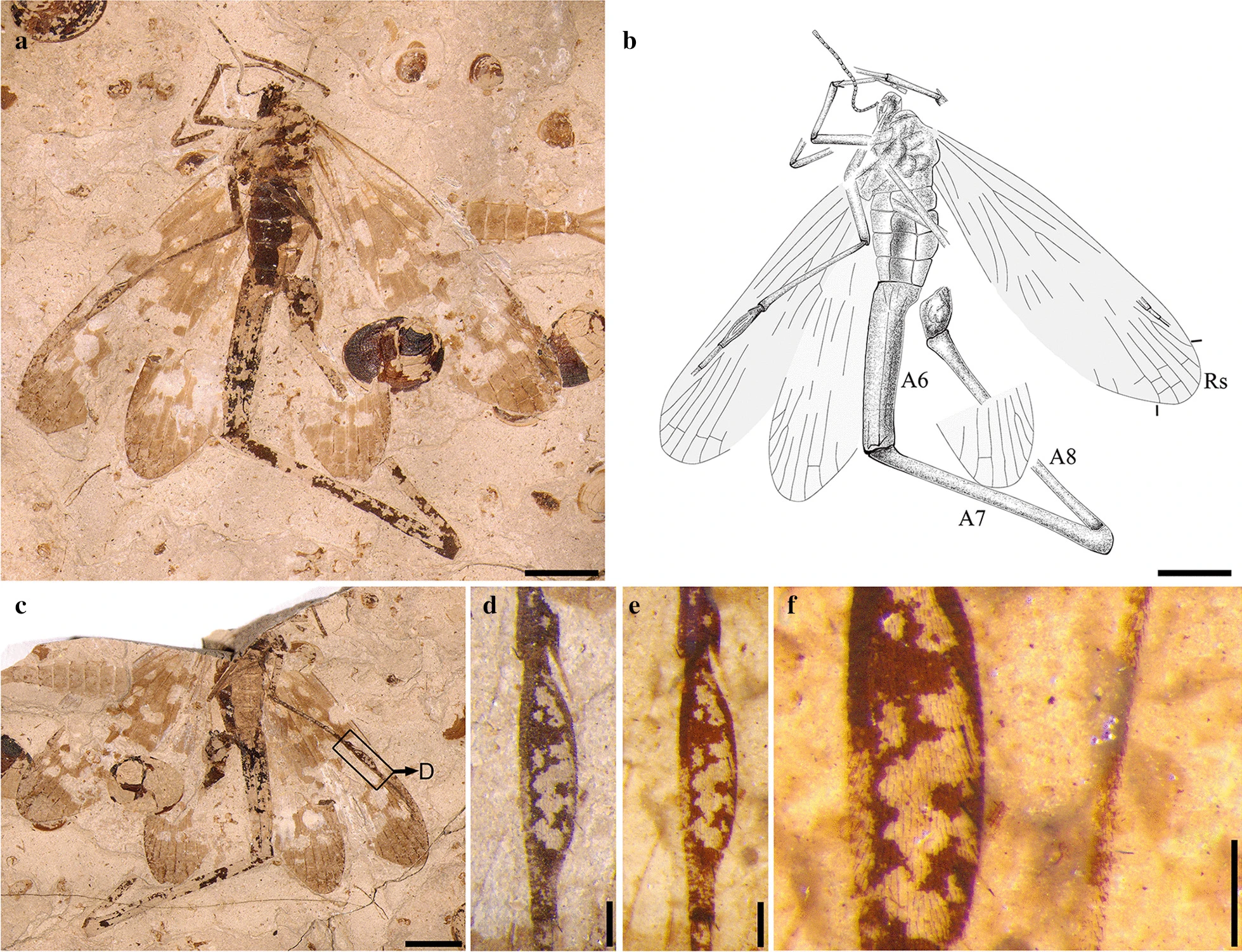
- Conicholcorpa longa

Scientific classification
- Domain: Eukaryota
- Kingdom: Animalia
- Phylum: Arthropoda
- Class: Insecta
- Order: Mecoptera
- Superfamily: Panorpoidea
- Family: †Holcorpidae; Willmann, 1989

Genera
- Conicholcorpa; Holcorpa; Miriholcorpa?; Fortiholcorpa?

= Holcorpidae =

Holcorpidae Temporal range: Middle Jurassic–Eocene

Extinct family of scorpionfies

Holcorpidae is an extinct family of scorpionflies. It contains two genera, Conicholcorpa which is known from the Middle Jurassic Daohugou beds of Inner Mongolia, China, and Holcorpa, known from the Eocene of North America, including the McAbee Fossil Beds of British Columbia, and the Florissant Formation of Colorado. Members of this family are distinguished by their unusually long male genitalia, as well as characteristics of their wing venation. Both Miriholcorpa and Fortiholcorpa from the Middle Jurassic of China also have affinities to this family, but the incompleteness of their remains and differences from known holcorpids make their placement uncertain.
