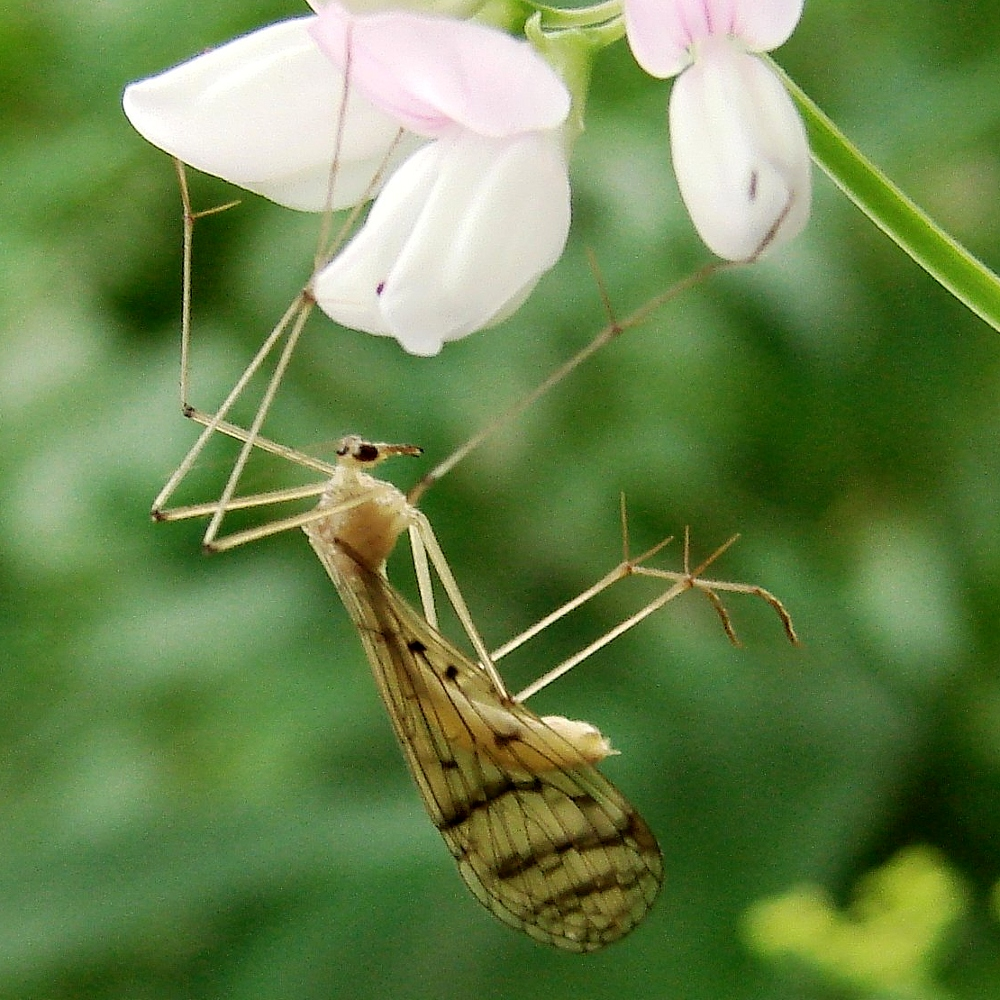

Scientific classification
- Domain: Eukaryota
- Kingdom: Animalia
- Phylum: Arthropoda
- Class: Insecta
- Order: Mecoptera
- Family: Bittacidae
- Genus: Bittacus
- Species: B. strigosus

Binomial name
- Bittacus strigosus Hagen, 1861

= Bittacus strigosus =

Species of insect

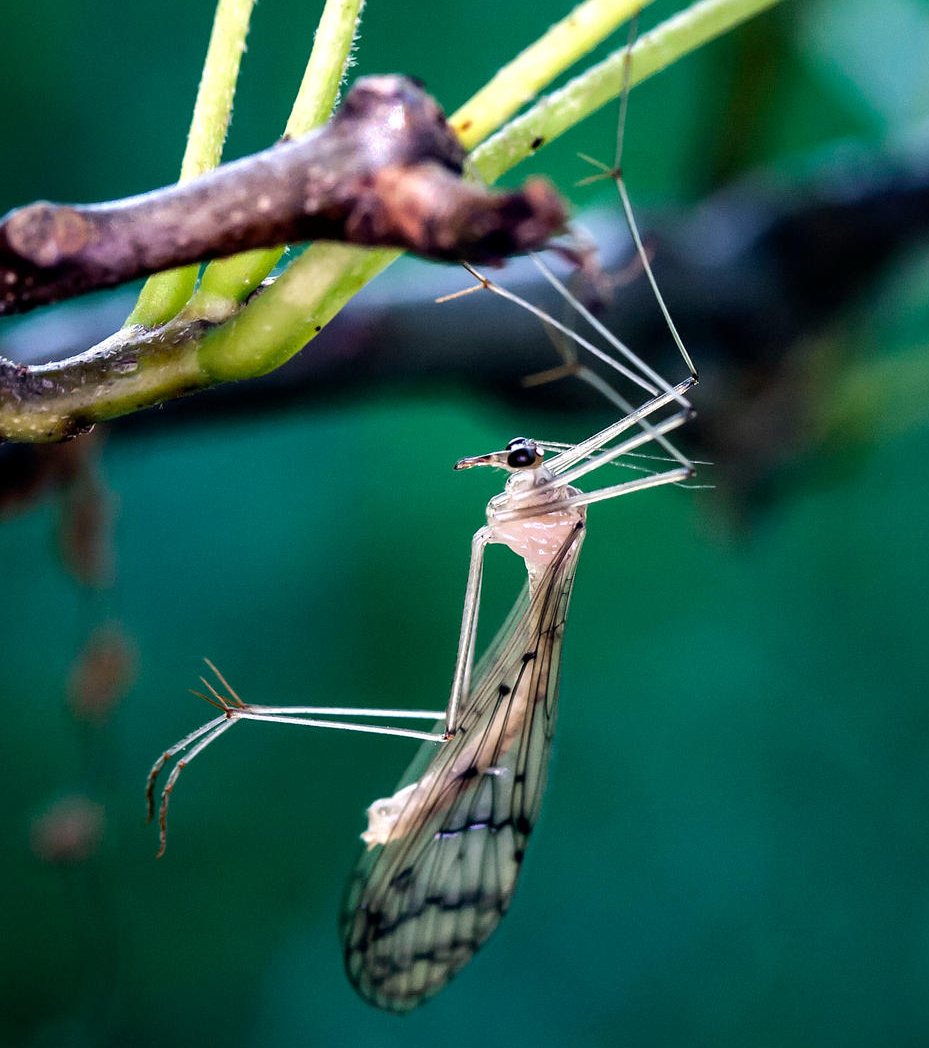
Thin Hangingfly or Striped scorpionfly (Bittacus strigosus)

Bittacus strigosus, the striped scorpionfly, is a species of hangingfly in the family Bittacidae, living in North America.

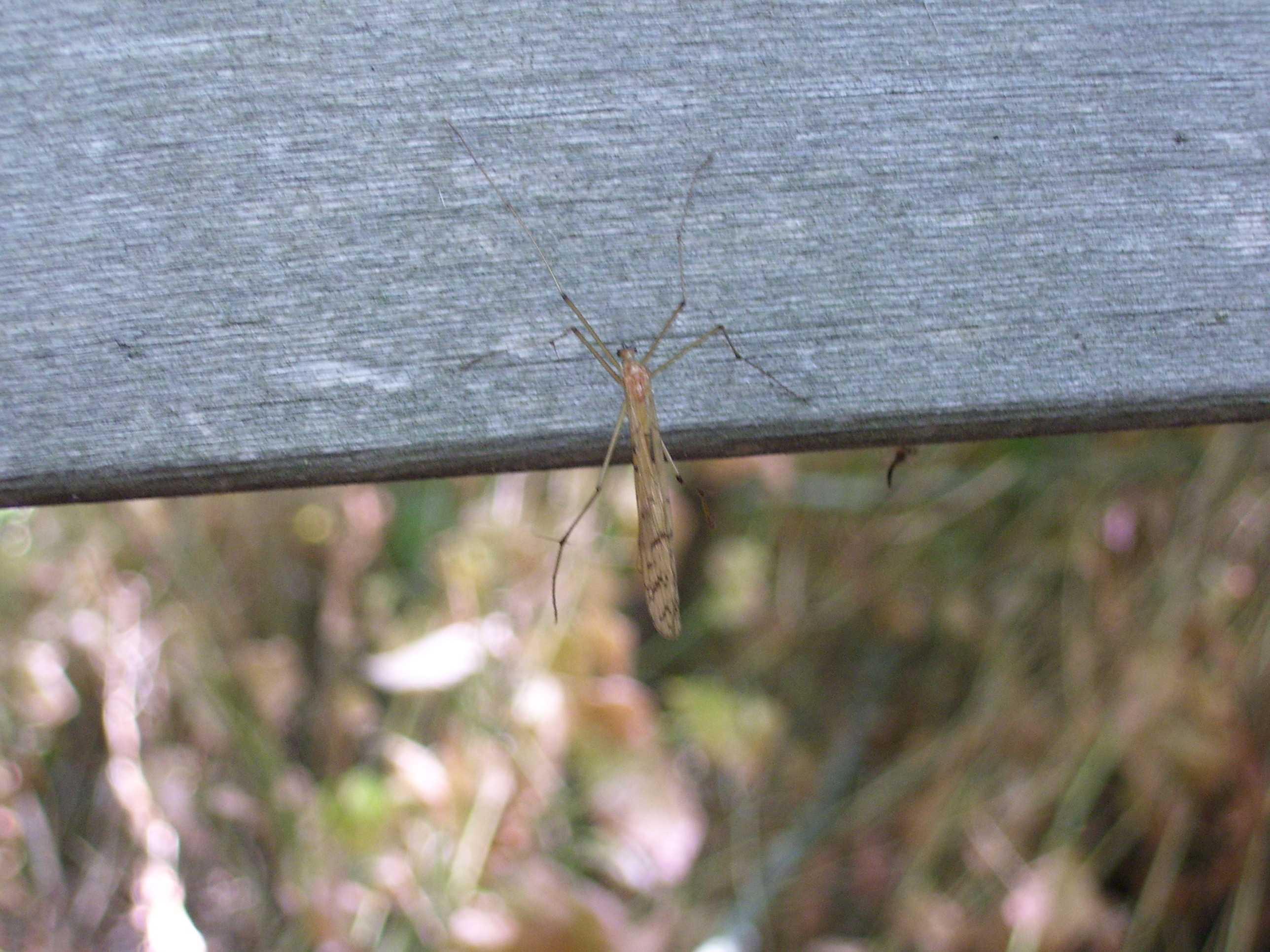
Striped scorpionfly, Bittacus strigosus
