= Bittacus occidentis =

Scientific classification
- Kingdom: Animalia
- Phylum: Arthropoda
- Class: Insecta
- Order: Mecoptera
- Family: Bittacidae
- Genus: Bittacus
- Species: B. occidentis

Binomial name
- Bittacus occidentis Walker, 1853

Species of insect

Bittacus occidentis is a species of hangingfly in the family Bittacidae. It is found in North America.
