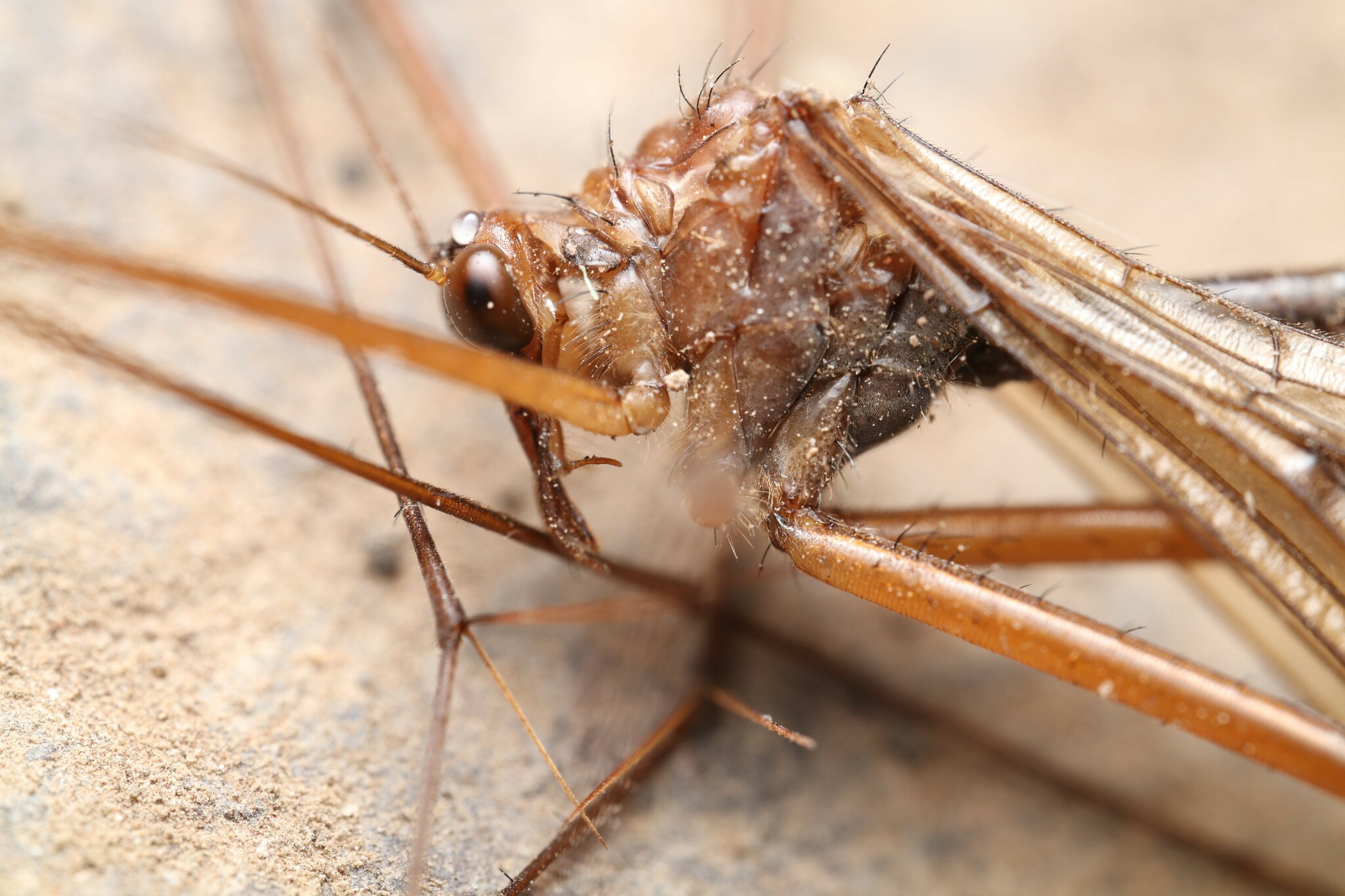

Scientific classification
- Kingdom: Animalia
- Phylum: Arthropoda
- Clade: Pancrustacea
- Class: Insecta
- Order: Mecoptera
- Family: Bittacidae
- Genus: Bittacus
- Species: B. chilensis

Binomial name
- Bittacus chilensis Klug, 1838

= Bittacus chilensis =

Species of insect

Bittacus chilensis is a species of hangingfly (family Bittacidae). It is the only species in the genus Bittacus that is native to Chile.
