= Adula =

Adula may refer to

- The Adula Alps
- Rheinwaldhorn, a mountain called in Italian "l'Adula"
- Adula Formation, a geological formation in China
