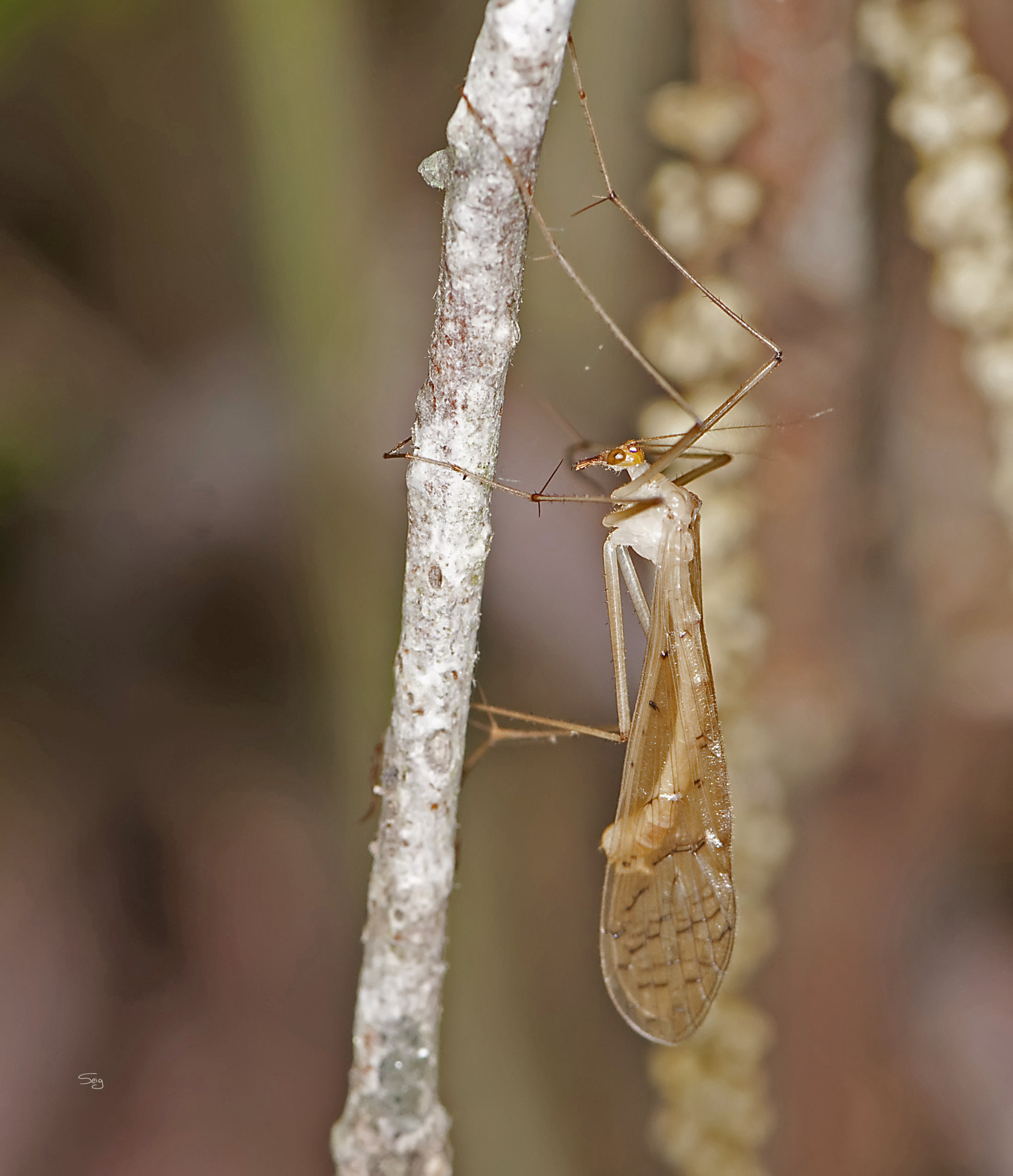

Scientific classification
- Kingdom: Animalia
- Phylum: Arthropoda
- Class: Insecta
- Order: Mecoptera
- Family: Bittacidae
- Genus: Bittacus
- Species: B. pilicornis

Binomial name
- Bittacus pilicornis Westwood, 1846

= Bittacus pilicornis =

Species of insect

Bittacus pilicornis, the hairy-horned scorpionfly, is a species of hangingfly in the family Bittacidae. It is found in North America. The hairy-horned scorpionfly is associated with the longleaf pine ecosystem.
