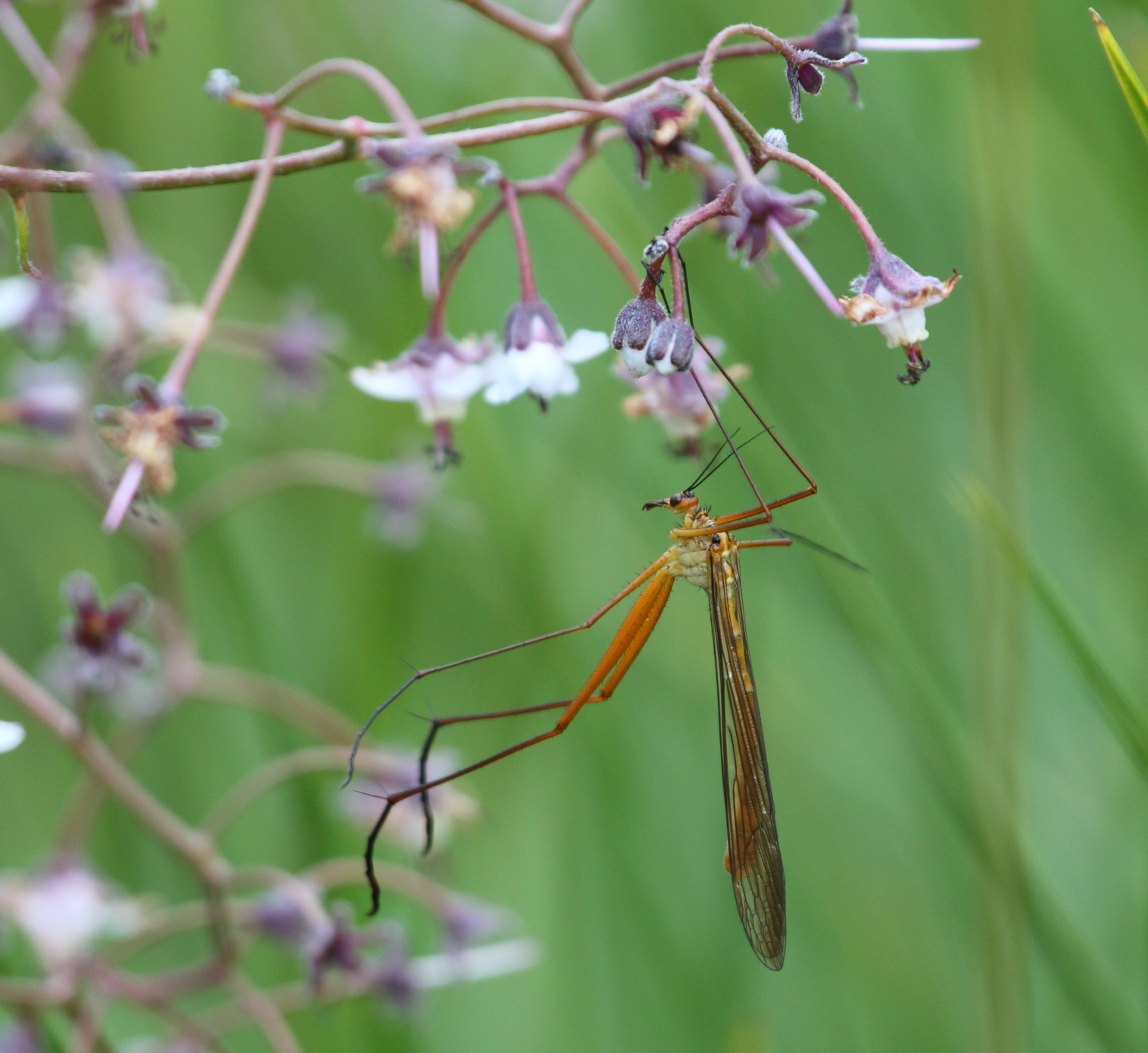

Scientific classification
- Kingdom: Animalia
- Phylum: Arthropoda
- Clade: Pancrustacea
- Class: Insecta
- Order: Mecoptera
- Family: Bittacidae
- Genus: Bittacus
- Species: B. kimminsi

Binomial name
- Bittacus kimminsi Tjeder, 1956

= Bittacus kimminsi =

Species of insect

Bittacus kimminsi is a species of hangingfly in the family Bittacidae. It is found in the highlands of South Africa (KwaZulu-Natal, Free State and Eastern Cape). Its favoured habitat is grassland, often near wetlands.
