= Apterobittacus =

Scientific classification
- Domain: Eukaryota
- Kingdom: Animalia
- Phylum: Arthropoda
- Class: Insecta
- Order: Mecoptera
- Family: Bittacidae
- Genus: Apterobittacus; MacLachlan, 1893
- Species: A. apterus

Binomial name
- Apterobittacus apterus (MacLachlan, 1871)

Genus of insects

Apterobittacus is a genus of hangingflies in the family Bittacidae. There is one described species in Apterobittacus, A. apterus.
