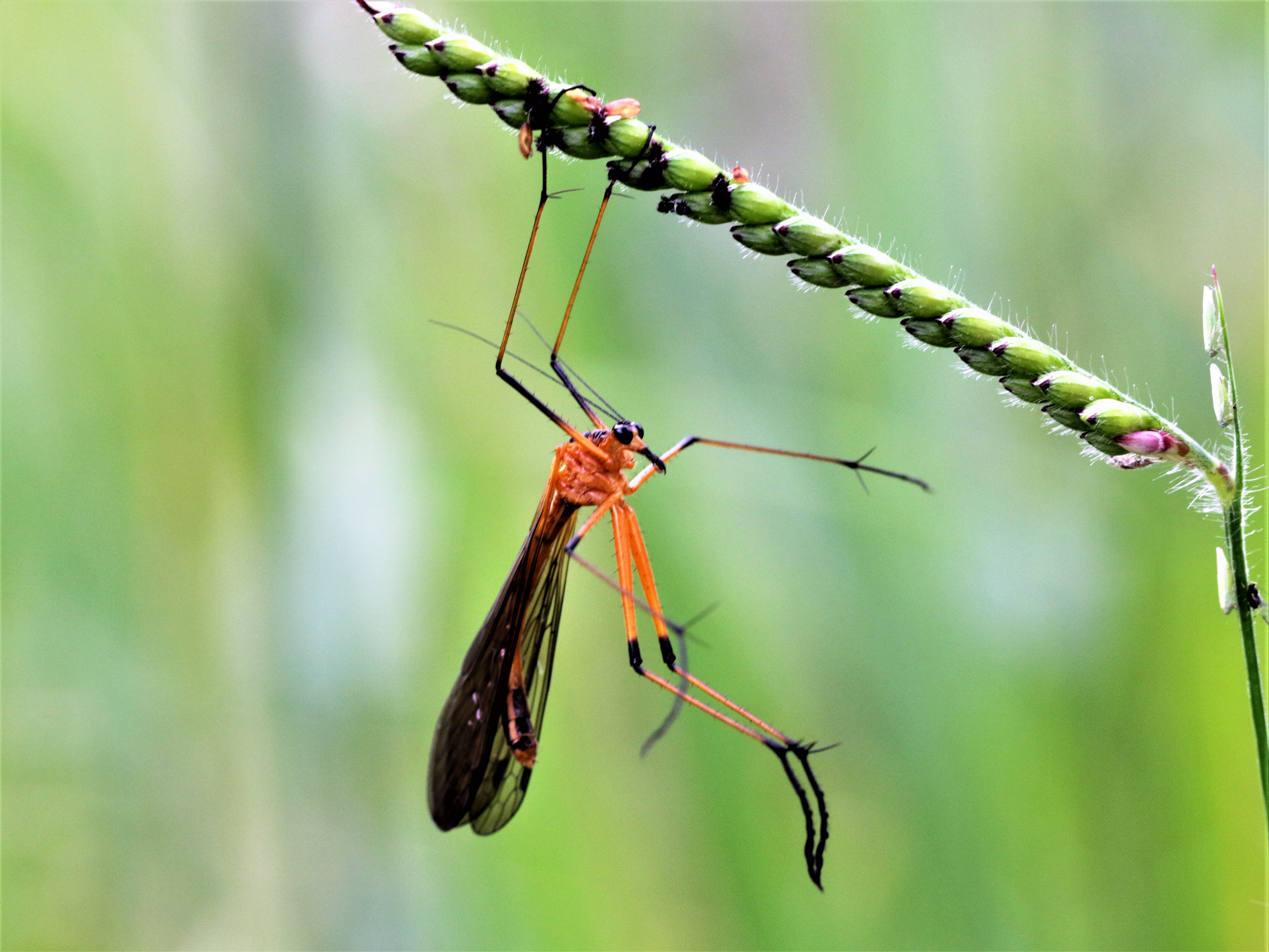
- Harpobittacus septentrionis

Scientific classification
- Kingdom: Animalia
- Phylum: Arthropoda
- Class: Insecta
- Order: Mecoptera
- Family: Bittacidae
- Genus: Harpobittacus; Gerstaecker, 1885

= Harpobittacus =

Genus of insects

Harpobittacus is a genus of hangingfly of the family Bittacidae found in Australia.

== Habitat and Development ==
Species of Harpobittacus are found in moist environments as larvae and adults. The adults are active from October to February and lay their eggs in the summer. They undergo metamorphosis, beginning with the female laying her cube–shaped eggs in the soil. The larva pupate underground, remaining moist to prevent desiccation and once they hatch, they feed on soil, mosses, dead insects, and leaf litter.

Adults normally display black bodies with orange markings and have claws at the ends of their long legs. They catch prey by hanging from vegetation with their forelegs and capturing small insects that get close with their hind-legs. They feed by holding the insect in their mouth, sucking out the soft tissues and juices and dropping the empty chitinous shells.

== Mating ==
Harpobittacus species exhibit some less common mating strategies, including pheromone secretion, nuptial gifts, and cryptic female choice.

=== Male competition ===
When males are attempting to attract females, other nearby males may approach in an attempt to steal his prey, using a tactic known as prey piracy.The males engage in male–male competition by fighting using their long legs to attack. The larger male has the advantage, as well as the original owner of the prey, due to having a better grip. Oftentimes, no harm is caused to either male, meaning fighting has a low cost associated with it. Males will also frequently use a conditional strategy of switching between hunting their own prey and stealing from other males.

=== Nuptial gifts ===
Males that have captured prey and are looking to mate will release a sex pheromone to attract prospective females. Once the male has attracted a female, he will present the prey, or nuptial gift, for the female to eat while they copulate. The nuptial gift is normally an arthropod that they've caught and deemed large enough to be able to attract a female with.The catching of prey can be energetically costly to the males, however they often eat some of the prey before offering it to prospective mates. The male will give the female a taste and then he will prevent her from eating it for the first several minutes as he grasps the tip of the female's abdomen with his genital claspers. This allows him to prolong the length of copulation, increasing the amount of sperm transferred to the female. Eventually, he gives her the prey and she continues to eat throughout the duration of copulation. Once the female stops eating, copulation ceases and she flies away.

=== Female choice behavior ===
Females of Harpobittacus species exert choice on which males to mate with and which will sire her offspring. Preliminary decisions are made by females based on the size of the prey the male is attempting to give her. If the prey is too small, she will often mate for a very short time or not at all. Females exercise post-copulatory control after mating with multiple males by determining rate of fertilization by each male. When females mate with males with small gifts, they immediately remate until they find a male with a large prey. Then females enter periods of sexual non receptivity and begin laying eggs, providing the male with the large gift the last–male sperm precedence, greatly increasing the odds of him parenting most of her offspring. By mating with multiple males, females can benefit by getting many nuptial gifts, which provide her with more energy for egg development. It also increases the genetic diversity of her offspring by having multiple different sires.

== Species ==
The genus contains the following species.

- Harpobittacus albatus Riek, 1954
- Harpobittacus australis Klug, 1838
- Harpobittacus christine Lambkin, 1994
- Harpobittacus nigriceps Selys-Longchamps, 1868
- Harpobittacus phaeoscius Riek, 1954
- Harpobittacus quasisimilis Lambkin, 1994
- Harpobittacus rubricatus Riek, 1954
- Harpobittacus scheibeli Esben-Petersen, 1935
- Harpobittacus septentrionis Lambkin, 1994
- Harpobittacus similis Esben-Petersen, 1935
- Harpobittacus tillyardi Esben-Petersen, 1915
