= Archaboilus =

Archaboilus Temporal range: Hettangian–Callovian

Scientific classification
- Kingdom: Animalia
- Phylum: Arthropoda
- Class: Insecta
- Order: Orthoptera
- Suborder: Ensifera
- Family: †Haglidae
- Subfamily: †Cyrtophyllitinae
- Genus: †Archaboilus; Martynov 1937

Species
- †A. kisylkiensis Martynov 1937; †A. martynovi Gorochov 1988; †A. musicus Gu, Engel & Ren, 2012; †A. ornatus Gu, Ren & Chen, 2024; †A. shurabicus Martynov 1937; †A. similis Zherikhin 1985

Extinct genus of cricket-like animals

Archaboilus is an extinct genus of cricket-like insect that lived during the Jurassic period. Five species are known, ranging from the earliest Jurassic (Hettangian) to the end of the Middle Jurassic (Callovian) of Asia.

Although behaviors are difficult to reconstruct for extinct species, in 2012 scientists based in China, the UK, and the US recreated the call of A. musicus based on a well-preserved fossil from the Jiulongshan Formation of China.

Based on studies, it is believed that male A. musicus produced pure-tone (musical) songs using a resonant mechanism tuned at a frequency of 6.4 kHz.
