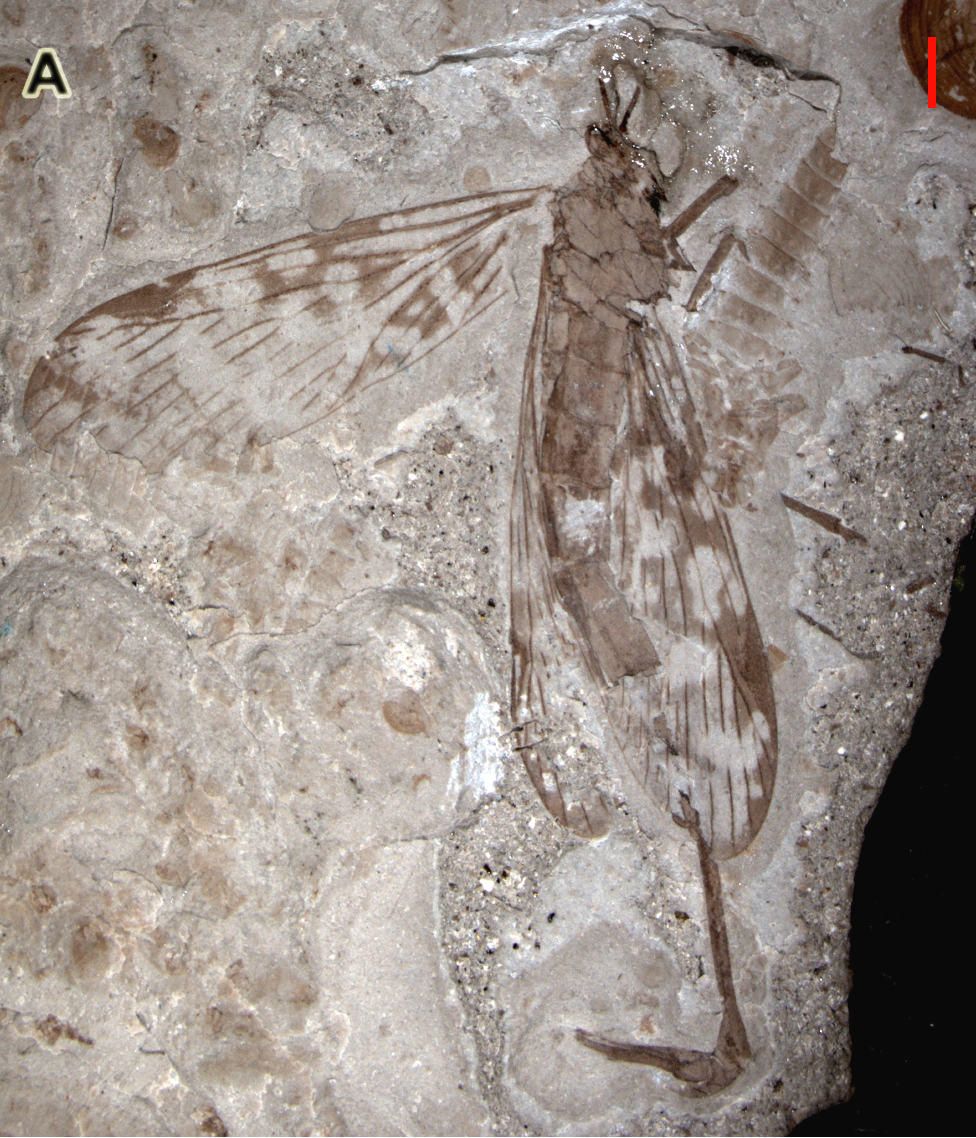
- Holotype photograph

Scientific classification
- Kingdom: Animalia
- Phylum: Arthropoda
- Class: Insecta
- Order: Mecoptera
- Genus: †Miriholcorpa; Wang, Shih, & Ren, 2013

Type species
- Miriholcorpa forcipata Wang, Shih, & Ren, 2013

= Miriholcorpa =

Miriholcorpa Temporal range: Middle Jurassic 165 Ma

Extinct genus of insects

Miriholcorpa is an extinct genus of scorpionfly (Mecoptera) from the Middle Jurassic period of China. The type and only species is M. forcipata, described in 2013.

== Discovery ==
Miriholcorpa was discovered in the Jiulongshan Formation at Daohugou Village of Ningcheng County in Inner Mongolia, China. The fossil is late Middle Jurassic in age, from the Callovian–Bathonian boundary (c. 165 million years ago). The genus name derives from the Latin miri meaning amazing, in reference to the high-quality preservation, and Holcorpa, the type genus of the extinct Mecopteran family Holcorpidae, to which Miriholcorpa shows similarities. The specific epithet forcipata, is Latin for pincer-like, in reference to the pincer-like structures on the genitalia.

== Description ==
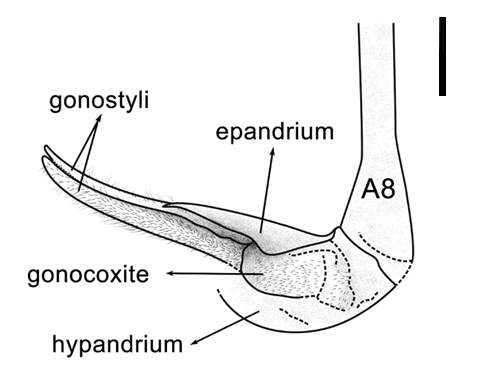
Illustration of genital structures. Scale bar: 1 mm (.04 in)

The holotype is 32.7 mm from head to the tip of the genital bulb. The left forewing, abdominal segments and genitalia are well preserved, while the venation of both hind wings are only partially preserved. The compound eyes are large and oval-shaped. The antennae are filiform. The genital bulb is enlarged with pincer-like structures, a feature hypothesized to be used in intrasexual competition with males, and/or a sexual display to females.

== Classification ==
The forewing anatomy of Miriholcorpa bears similarities to members of the Holcorpidae, yet the venation of the hindwings are not fully preserved, and cannot be used to definitively assign it to the family. As such, the describers placed Miriholcorpa as incertae sedis (uncertain placement) within Mecoptera pending further discoveries. Miriholcorpa was described along with another Mecopteran, Fortiholcorpa paradoxa, also unassigned to any family.
