= Abor people =

Abor people may refer to:

- The Adi people of the hills of Nyingchi Prefecture, Tibet
- The Anlo Ewe of southeastern Ghana and southwestern Togo
- The Galo tribe of Arunāchal Pradesh, India

== See also ==
- Abor (disambiguation)
