= Argong Formation =

Geologic formation in China

A’ergong Formation
- Type: Geological Formation

Location
- Region: Inner Mongolia Autonomous Region
- Country: China

The Argong Formation, also rendered A’ergong, is located in the Inner Mongolia Autonomous Region and was formed during the Cretaceous period.
