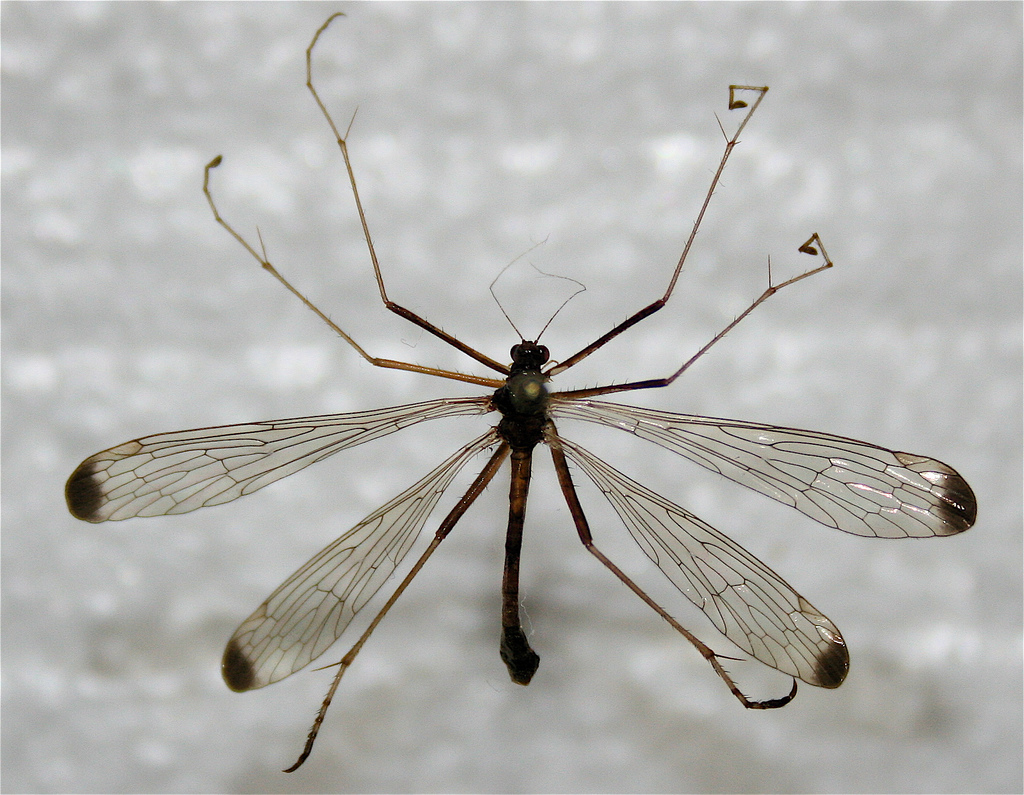

Scientific classification
- Kingdom: Animalia
- Phylum: Arthropoda
- Clade: Pancrustacea
- Class: Insecta
- Order: Mecoptera
- Family: Bittacidae
- Genus: Hylobittacus
- Species: H. apicalis

Binomial name
- Hylobittacus apicalis Hagen, 1861

Synonyms
- Haplodictyus incertus Navás, 1926

= Hylobittacus apicalis =

Species of insect

Hylobittacus apicalis is a species of hangingfly in the order Mecoptera, and the only species within the genus Hylobittacus.

== Description ==
H. apicalis is a holometabolous insect with two pairs of wings. Adults are medium-sized and reach a body length of around 1.9 cm. Antenna, when compared proportionally to body size, are short. H. apicalis is widely distributed throughout the lower United States and are the most common hangingfly in Illinois. An isolated population also lives within Mexico. Adults live around small herbaceous plants and are active diurnally which makes this an easy species for study. Adults can be found between late April and early August. Males and females of this species can be distinguished by sexual dimorphism obvious in the structure of the abdominal segments. H. apicalis is capable of flight although it is slow and only short flights are completed, usually less than 4 feet. When not in flight the adults hang from the foliage by their front legs and it is from this behaviour that the family Bittacidae get their common name of Hangingflies. Wings remain extended when they are hanging at rest. Due to the specialization of the tarsi for hanging from foliage it is difficult or impossible for adults to walk; the tarsi do not support the body weight. Populations can reach large sizes of several thousand. They can coexist with other populations of Mecoptera in the same area.

== Mortality factors ==
=== Predators ===
Predators of H. apicalis are mainly a number of arthropods. Web making spiders are the most important predator of H. apicalis as they become caught in the webs as they fly through the vegetation. Spiders account for the majority of adult mortality. Other common predators are Robber flies, Damselflies and occasionally even cannibalistic actions of other H. apicalis adults. The cannibalistic behavior is more likely to occur to freshly molted adults which are still soft bodied.

=== Parasites ===
Forcipomyia mcateei are common parasites that feed on the dorsal side of the thorax and cervical areas of an adult H. apicalis.

=== Infections ===
Adults are also commonly infected by the microsporidium Nosema apicalis. Infection rates increase as the summer season progresses and females have infection rates 3 times higher than males. This microsporidium has been found in a few other mecopteran species although infection rates are considerably lower making H. apicalis the primary host. The infection mainly occurs in the fat body and the midgut of the adults.

== Prey ==
Prey is mostly non-insect invertebrates and insects and is chosen non-selectively and in relation to the abundance in the environment. The most common prey that form the diet of H. apicalis are Auchenorrhyncha. The type most commonly eaten is aphids, although treehoppers, leafhoppers, and psyllids are also frequent prey. Although these prey are the most captured, there seems to be little preference, except when males are choosing prey for mating. Males choose larger more palatable prey when it is for the purpose of mating. Prey is captured in 3 ways. First, prey can be captured by quickly flying out to grab it using the prehensile tarsi of the hind legs. Second, adults can hang from their front legs and catch prey as they pass by, also using their prehensile hind tarsi. Third, adults may just move their mid and hind legs back and forth as they fly or as they walk along a plant and if a prey touched they will capture it. Although all three of these methods have been observed in H. apicalis adults, the first two are much more common. Once prey is captured, H. apicalis hangs by the front legs and begins eating while manipulating the prey item with the mid and hind legs.

== Mating behaviour ==
Mating behavior is particularly interesting in this species. When large populations congregate females have large numbers of males to choose to mate with and do exhibit mate selection. The males’ reproductive success is dependent on the number of females that can be mated with however female reproductive success is limited by the number of eggs that can be laid. Males attract females by catching prey and holding it with the hind tarsi. With the prey held in this way the male begins a short flight through the vegetation. After this flight the male lands by grabbing the vegetation with his forelegs and releases pheromones by exposing glands on his abdomen. Females are attracted to males by the pheromones at a distance of up to 10-15m away and will land in the same way, using the forelegs to hang, and will face the male. The female lowers her wings which appears to be a signal for the male to present the prey. The male, still holding the prey, presents the prey to the female as a nuptial gift. The size of this nuptial gift is important as it will determine if copulation will occur and, if it does, how successful copulation is. Females begin to eat the gift while males attempt to initiate copulation. If the prey item is too small the female will leave after sampling it but before copulation has occurred. If the prey item is larger the female may allow copulation but may leave after 5 to 20 minutes, which prevents full sperm transfer. Finally, if the prey item is large copulation will occur with full sperm transfer and the males will end copulation after 20 minutes. Females feed on the nuptial gift the entire time during copulation. Once copulation is finished the male and female struggle with each other to keep the prey. Most often the male keeps it, although 8% of the time the female will keep it. Occasionally in the struggle it will be dropped amongst the litter.

Once copulation is completed the male will usually retrieve the prey if it was dropped by the female and feed from it briefly. If the prey is very large the male may use it up to 2 more times in copulations. However, because of the decreased nutritional value each successive copulation will end sooner. There appears to be a distinct benefit for a male to initially find a large prey item that can be used multiple times as the time between copulation averages 7.28 minutes in this case instead of the average inter-copulatory time of 21.7 minutes if the male must find a new prey.

The female's behavior after copulation is dependent on the size of nuptial gift. If the male presented a small nuptial gift the female will continue looking for a mate. However, if the nuptial gift was large she will become unreceptive to the olfactory signals sent out by males for 3 to 4 hours. During this non-receptivity period the female lays the fertilized eggs by hanging and dropping the eggs onto the forest floor. These eggs are roughly spherical with dimensions of 0.7mm by 0.65 mm and tan to orange coloured. The average number of eggs laid by the female is 3.5. Neither the male or female demonstrate parental care. The female tries to maximize reproductive success by mating again at the end of each unreceptive period. With this maximization, females lay an average of 14 eggs per day over 4 mating periods. Females feed for an average of 90 minutes per day over the course of these matings and so, when males are abundant, females rarely hunt for their own prey and rely on the nuptial gifts.

=== Alternate male tactics ===
Some males have been shown to employ alternate tactics when it comes to prey capture and mating. Males may steal prey from another male instead of capturing it himself. This behavior seems to be partially dictated by the population density. If a male encounters another male with prey or a copulating pair with prey than he will attempt to steal it. However, if the male encounters a prey item before he encounters another male or copulating pair with prey then he will simply catch his own prey. This prey stealing is successful around 57% of the time. Males appear to have 2 ways of undergoing this stealing behavior. First, the stealing male simply flies up to the other male or the copulation pair and struggles to get the prey. Second, the stealing male will actually fly with force into the male or copulating pair which may act to increase their chances of prey stealing. Further, in one study 15% of the interrupted copulations the stealing male proceeded to mate with the female.

In addition to simply stealing prey males can employ another tactic. Some males show female mimicking behavior in order to steal prey. These males identify another male that is trying to attract a female by sight only, not by olfaction as females do. The stealing male will land like a female would and then further mimic females by lower their wings, which females do before the nuptial gift is offered. Once this has occurred, 67% of the time the stealing male is offered the prey by the signaling male. As the stealing male samples the prey item they keep the tip of their abdomen out of reach, just as females do while they determine if the prey is good enough to allow copulation. Within about 2 minutes the signaling male tries to get the prey back from the stealing male which is successful 66% of the time. The rest of these encounters end with the stealing male flying off with the stolen prey.

== Juvenile forms ==
The larvae of H. apicalis is eruciform with a sclerotized head and segmented, yet soft, body. The abdominal segments have prolegs. The larval eyes are composed of 7 ommatidia. The larvae are saprophagous and have been seen to feed on dead insects in the field. The fourth instar larva prepares a burrow in which pupation occurs. H. apicalis pupae are exarate and morphologically similar to the adults with the wings folded tightly against the body.
