= Xiheli Formation =

Geologic formation in China

- Type: Geological Formation

Location
- Region: Shanxi Province
- Country: China

The Xiheli Formation is located in Wutai County. Shanxi Province. It contains grayish purple. purplish red slate, sandy slate and muddy sandstone. It has been dated to the Paleoproterozoic era.
