= Zushimiao Formation =

Geologic formation in China

- Stratigraphic range: Cambrian
- Type: Geological Formation

Lithology
- Primary: Slate
- Other: Coal

Location
- Region: Henan Province
- Country: China

The Zushimiao Formation is located in Xichuan County, Henan province and contains carbonaceous and siliceous slate with interbeds of coal seams.
