= Jianxing Formation =

Geologic formation in China

- Type: Geological Formation

Location
- Region: Heilongjiang Province
- Country: China

The Jianxing Formation (simplified Chinese: 建兴组; traditional Chinese: 建興組) is located in Suiling County, Heilongjiang Province and is composed of basal conglomerate and gravel-bearing coarse-grained sandstone, with interbeds of siltstone, mudstone and coal seams. The Jianxing Formation has been dated to the Early Cretaceous period.
