= Zusailing Formation =

Geologic formation in Hainan, China

- Type: Geological formation

Location
- Region: Hainan Province
- Country: China

The Zusailing Formation is located in Baoting County, Hainan Province, China. It contains carbonaceous phyllite with interbeds of crystalline limestone. Its dated to the late Silurian Period.
