= Jianshanying Formation =

Geological formation

- Stratigraphic range: Late Carboniferous
- Type: Geological formation

Lithology
- Primary: Conglomerate

Location
- Coordinates: 27.3°N 100.7°E
- Region: Yunnan
- Country: China

Type section
- Named for: Jianshanying, Ninglang, Yunnan
- Named by: Yunnan Provincial Bureau of Geology and Mineral Resources Exploration and Development
- Year defined: 1977
- Jianshanying Formation (China) Jianshanying Formation (Yunnan)

The Jianshanying Formation (Chinese: 尖山营組; pinyin: jiānshānyíng zǔ) is a geological formation located in Ninglang County, Yunnan Province. It has been dated to the Late Carboniferous period.
