= Beipiao Formation =

Geologic formation in Hebei Province, China

- Stratigraphic range: Sinemurian-Toarcian; ~194–183 Ma
- Type: Geological formation
- Underlies: Haifanggou Formation (unconformably)

Lithology
- Primary: Coal

Location
- Location: Xinglong County
- Coordinates: 41.3°N 120.2°E
- Approximate paleocoordinates: 46.8°N 127.9°E
- Region: Hebei
- Country: China

Type section
- Named for: Beipiao
- Beipiao Formation (China) Beipiao Formation (Hebei)

The Beipiao Formation contains coal measures dated to the Early Jurassic period. Its mainly located in Xinglong County, Hebei Province

== Fossil content ==
- Cockroaches
  - Euryblattula beipiaoensis, E. chaoyangensis
  - Rhipidoblattina longa, R. mayingziensis
  - Taublatta yangshugouensis
