= Arbasayi Formation =

Geologic formation in China

A’erbasayi Formation
- Type: Geological Formation

Location
- Region: Xinjiang
- Country: China

The Arbasayi Formation, also rendered A’erbasayi, is located in the Uygur Autonomous Region in Xinjiang.This formation contains Volcano-clastic rock with interbeds of purple conglomerate, felsitic porphyry, quartz porphyry, tuffite and andesite intercalated with rhyolitic porphyry. This formation is dated to the Early Permian period.
