= Abuqiehai Formation =

Rock formation in the Inner Mongolia Autonomous Region

- Stratigraphic range: Cambrian
- Type: Geological Formation

Lithology
- Primary: Limestone
- Other: Shale

Location
- Region: Inner Mongolia Autonomous Region
- Country: China

The Abuqiehai Formation is located in the Inner Mongolia Autonomous Region and is mainly composed of thin-bedded bamboo-leaf-like limestone, oolitic limestone, and an alternation of thick kidney limestone and shale. It has been dated to the mid-Cambrian period.
