= Armantie Formation =

Geologic formation in China

A’ermantie Formation
- Stratigraphic range: Devonian
- Type: Geological Formation

Location
- Region: Xinjiang
- Country: China

The Armantie Formation, also rendered A’ermantie, is located in the Xinjiang Uygur Autonomous Region and is dated to the middle Devonian period.
