= Aba Formation =

Geologic formation in China

- Stratigraphic range: Early Triassic
- Type: Geological Formation

Location
- Region: Sichuan
- Country: China

The Aba Formation found in Sichuan Province of China.

It dates to Early Triassic Period, and contains several types of slate.
