= Artenghala Formation =

Geologic formation in China

A’ertenghala Formation
- Type: Geological Formation

Location
- Region: Inner Mongolia Autonomous Region
- Country: China

The Artenghala Formation, also rendered A’ertenghala, is a geological formation located in the Inner Mongolia Autonomous Region and is dated to the Paleoproterozoic period.
