= Xihui Formation =

Geologic formation in China

- Type: Geological Formation

Location
- Region: Jiangxi Province
- Country: China

The Xihui Formation is located in Ganxian County. Jiangxi Province and has been dated to the Neoarchean period.
