= Artashi Formation =

A’ertashi Formation
- Type: Geological Formation

Location
- Region: Xinjiang
- Country: China

The Artashi Formation, also rendered A’ertashi, is located in the village of A’ertashi in Shache County, Xinjiang Uygur Autonomous Region. It is dated to the Paleocene period.
