= Arshan Formation =

Geologic formation in China

A’ershan Formation
- Type: Geological Formation

Location
- Region: Inner Mongolia Autonomous Region
- Country: China

The Arshan Formation, also rendered A’ershan , is located in the Inner Mongolia Autonomous Region and is dated to Pleistocene period.
