= Zuozuo Formation =

Geologic formation in Tibet

- Stratigraphic range: Late Permian
- Type: Geological Formation

Location
- Region: Tibet
- Country: China

The Zuozuo Formation is located in Ritu County inside the Tibet Autonomous Region. It has been dated to the Late Permian period.
