= Artaxi Formation =

Geologic formation in China

A’ertaxi Formation
- Stratigraphic range: Devonian
- Type: Geological Formation

Location
- Region: Xinjiang Uygur Autonomous Region
- Country: China

The Artaxi Formation, also rendered A’ertaxi, is a geological formation. It is located in the Xinjiang Uygur Autonomous Region and is dated to the Early Devonian period.
