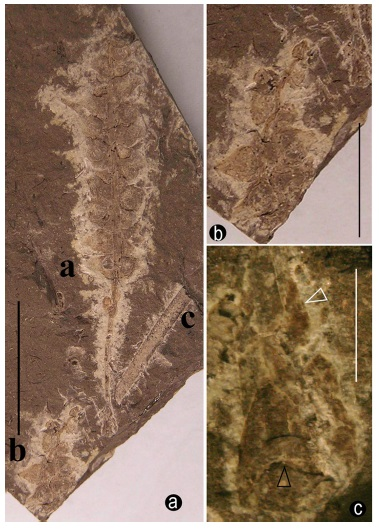
- Schmeissneria sinensis

Scientific classification
- Kingdom: Plantae
- Division: ?Ginkgophyta
- Class: ?Ginkgoopsida
- Order: ?Ginkgoales
- Family: Schmeissneriaceae
- Genus: Schmeissneria Kirchner & Van Konijnenburg-Van Cittert, 1994

Species
- S. microstachys (Presl, 1838) (type); S. sinensis Wang, 2007

= Schmeissneria =

Schmeissneria Temporal range: Early-Middle Jurassic, 200–170 Ma

Extinct genus of seed-bearing plants

Schmeissneria is a genus of possible early angiosperms recorded from the Lower Jurassic of Europe and the Middle Jurassic of China, traditionally included in the Ginkgophyta.
