= Abag Formation =

Geologic formation in China

- Stratigraphic range: Pleistocene
- Type: Geological Formation

Location
- Region: Inner Mongolia
- Country: China

The Abag Formation is located in the Inner Mongolia Autonomous Region and dates to the Pleistocene period.
