= Zuosuo Formation =

Geologic formation in China

- Stratigraphic range: Early Triassic
- Type: Geological Formation

Location
- Region: Yunnan Province
- Country: China

The Zuosuo Formation is located in Lijiang County, Yunnan Province and is dated to the Early Triassic period.
