= Ah Formation =

Geologic formation in Xinjiang, China

- Stratigraphic range: Middle Jurassic
- Type: Geological Formation

Location
- Region: Xinjiang
- Country: China

The Ah Formation is located in Kuqa County, Xinjiang Uygur Autonomous Region and is dated to the Middle Jurassic period.
