= Artushileike Formation =

Geologic formation in Xinjiang, China

A’ertushileike Formation
- Stratigraphic range: Early Permian
- Type: Geological Formation

Location
- Country: China

The Artushileike Formation, also known as A’ertushileike, is situated near the village of A'ertushileike in the southwestern part of the Xinjiang Uygur Autonomous Region, China. It is dated to the Early Permian period.
