= Abor Formation =

Geologic formation in India

- Type: Geological Formation

Location
- Region: India
- Country: India

The Abor Formation is located in the Siang district, Arunachal Pradesh, India. It is dated to the Permian. This formation consists of basalt, volcaniclastic breccia and rhyotaxitic dacite. This formation was named by the Abor Expedition of 1911–1912.
