= Adula Formation =

- Stratigraphic range: Late Triassic
- Type: Geological Formation

Location
- Region: Yunnan Province
- Country: China

The Adula Formation is located in Yunnan Province of southern China.

== Geology ==
This formation contains grayish black thin-bedded sandstone, mudstone, and intercalating beds of coal seams.

The Adula Formation has been dated to the Late Triassic Period.

== See also ==
- Triassic geologic formations
