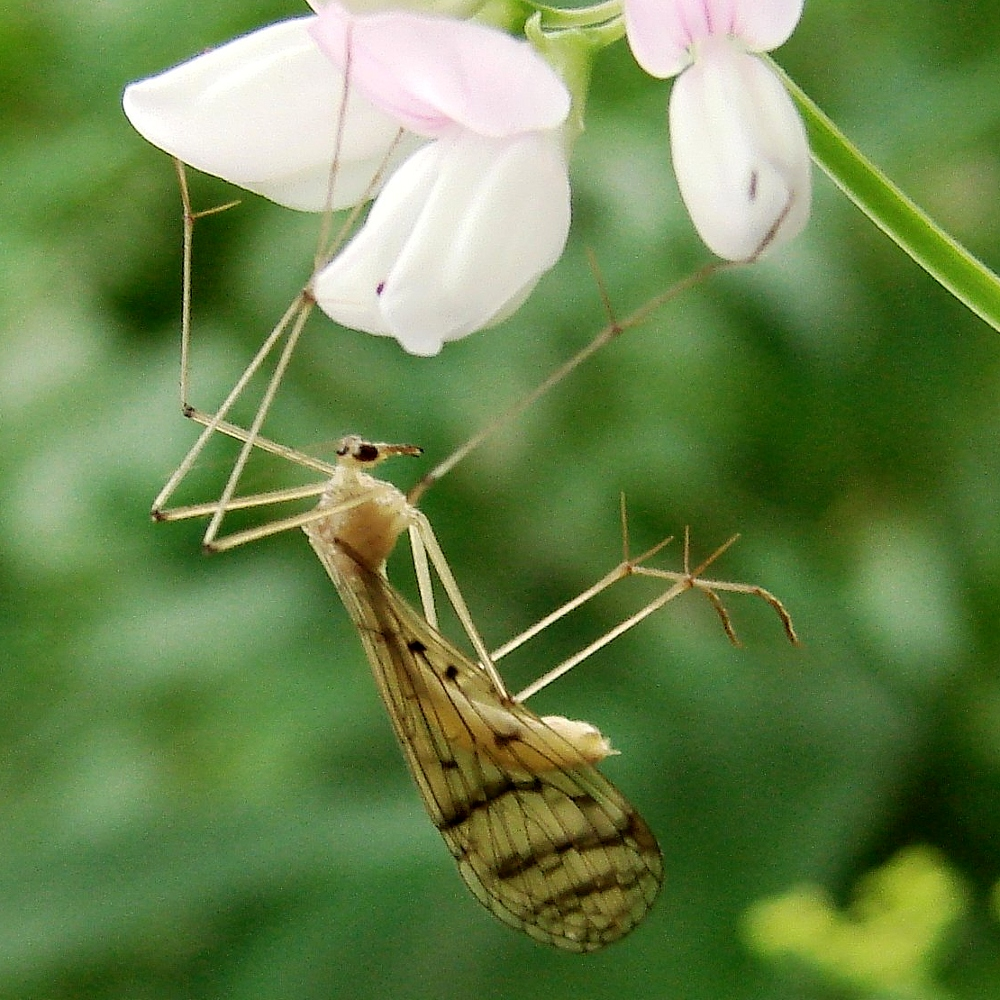
- Bittacus strigosus

Scientific classification
- Kingdom: Animalia
- Phylum: Arthropoda
- Class: Insecta
- Order: Mecoptera
- Family: Bittacidae
- Genus: Bittacus; Latreille, 1805

Species
- See text

= Bittacus =

Bittacus Temporal range: Cenomanian–Present

Genus of insects

Bittacus is a genus of hangingflies in the order Mecoptera. Members of the genus have a cosmopolitan distribution. The genus has existed since at least the earliest Late Cretaceous. Bittacus is considered "grossly paraphyletic" and serves as a catch-all for many distantly related species of hangingflies.

== Characteristics ==
Members of this genus have long legs, the front pair of which are modified for grasping and are used to hang from vegetation. The other two pairs have tarsal claws and are modified for catching prey. There are two pairs of equal sized, membranous wings with dark mottling. The mouthparts are modified for chewing. The insects superficially resemble crane flies.

== Species ==
The following species are listed in the World Checklist of Extant Mecoptera Species:

- Bittacus aequalis Navás, 1914 – Kenya
- Bittacus africanus Esben-Petersen, 1915 – Zaire
- Bittacus alluaudi Navás, 1914 – Kenya, Tanzania, Ethiopia
- Bittacus andinus Londt and Byers, 1974 – Bolivia, Peru
- Bittacus angrensis Souza Lopes and Mangabeira, 1942 – Brazil
- Bittacus annae Londt, 1972 – South Africa
- Bittacus appendiculatus Esben-Petersen, 1927 – China (Yunnan)
- Bittacus armatus Tjeder, 1956 – Zimbabwe, South Africa
- Bittacus banksi Esben-Petersen, 1915 – Costa Rica, El Salvador, Guatemala, Honduras, Mexico, Panama
- Bittacus berlandi Capra, 1939 – Tanzania, Kenya
- Bittacus bicornis Londt, 1993 – South Africa
- Bittacus boraceiensis -Morgante, 1967 – Brazil (São Paulo)
- Bittacus boranicus Capra, 1939 – Ethiopia
- Bittacus brasiliensis Klug, 1838 – Argentina, Brazil
- Bittacus brunneus Esben-Petersen, 1927 – Paraguay
- Bittacus bullatus Londt, 1972 – South Africa
- Bittacus burgeoni Navás, 1930 – Zaire
- Bittacus burmanus Tjeder, 1974 – Burma
- Bittacus byersi Londt, 1972 – South Africa
- Bittacus capensis (Thunberg), 1784 – South Africa
- Bittacus caprai Londt, 1972 – Zambia, Zimbabwe
- Bittacus carpenteri Cheng, 1957 – China (Sichuan)
- Bittacus chevalieri (Navás), 1908 – Chad, Mali, Senegal, French Somaliland
- Bittacus chilensis Klug, 1838 – Chile
- Bittacus chlorostigma MacLachlan, 1881 – United States (California, Oregon)
- Bittacus chujoi Issiki and Cheng, 1947 – Taiwan
- Bittacus cirratus Tjeder, 1956 – China (Manchuria, Jiangxi)
- Bittacus contumax Tjeder, 1956 – China
- Bittacus coreanus Issiki, 1929 – China (Jiangsu), Korea
- Bittacus cottrelli Londt, 1972 – South Africa
- Bittacus discors Navás, 1914 – Kenya, Somalia
- Bittacus disternum Byers, 1996 – Costa Rica
- Bittacus diversinervis Souza Lopes and Mangabeira, 1942 – Brazil
- Bittacus elisabethae Navás, 1930 – Zaire
- Bittacus eremus Lambkin, 1988 – Australia
- Bittacus erythrostigma Byers, 1975 – Uganda, Zaire
- Bittacus femoralis Klug, 1838 – Brazil
- Bittacus flavescens Klug, 1838 – Brazil, Venezuela
- Bittacus formosanus Issiki, 1927 – Taiwan
- Bittacus fritzi Williner, 1990 – Argentina
- Bittacus fumosus Esben-Petersen, 1913 – Kenya, Zimbabwe, Tanzania, Zambia
- Bittacus geniculatus Erichson, 1848 – Brazil, Guyana
- Bittacus golbachi Williner, 1990 – Argentina
- Bittacus gressitti Cheng, 1957 – China (Guangdong)
- Bittacus hageni Brauer, 1860 – Austria, Belgium, France
- Bittacus henryi Kimmins, 1928 – Sri Lanka
- Bittacus homburgerae Navás, 1933 – French Guinea
- Bittacus indicus Walker 1853 – India
- Bittacus insularis Esben-Petersen 1915 – Sri Lanka
- Bittacus issikii Miyamoto 1979 – Japan
- Bittacus italicus (Müller) 1766 -Belgium, Bosnia, Germany, Poland, Romania, Spain, Switzerland, Ukraine
- Bittacus kagoshimaensis Issiki 1929 -Japan
- Bittacus kimminsi Tjeder 1956 – South Africa
- Bittacus kunenensis Wood 1933 – Namibia
- Bittacus laevipes Navás 1909 – Japan
- Bittacus latipennis Gerstaecker 1885 – India
- Bittacus leptocaudus Byers 1965 – Thailand
- Bittacus leptocercus Navás 1934 – Tanzania
- Bittacus lineatus Navás 1914 – Kenya
- Bittacus livingstonei Londt 1981 – Malawi
- Bittacus maculatus Issiki 1927 – Taiwan
- Bittacus maculosus Byers 1965 – Brazil, Trinidad
- Bittacus malaisei Tjeder 1974 – Burma
- Bittacus marginatus Miyake 1913 – Japan
- Bittacus mastrillii Navás 1913 – Japan
- Bittacus mexicanus Klug 1838 – Mexico (Oaxaca, San Luis Potosí)
- Bittacus milleri Londt 1978 – South Africa
- Bittacus montanus Weele 1910 – Angola, Cameroon, Kenya, Malawi, Zimbabwe, Rwanda, Tanzania, Uganda, Zaire, Zambia
- Bittacus moschinus Navás 1914 – Malawi, Tanzania, Zambia
- Bittacus natalensis Wood 1933 – Mozambique, Malawi, Zimbabwe, South Africa
- Bittacus nebulosus Klug 1838 – Mozambique, South Africa
- Bittacus nipponicus Navás 1909 – Japan
- Bittacus nodosus Rust and Byers 1976 – India, Pakistan
- Bittacus occidentis Walker 1853 – United States
- Bittacus omega Morgante 1967 – Brazil
- Bittacus oreinus Navás 1914 – Ethiopia
- Bittacus panamensis Byers 1958 – Costa Rica, Panama, Venezuela
- Bittacus peninsularis Byers 1996 – Mexico (Baja California Sur)
- Bittacus peringueyi Esben-Petersen 1913 – South Africa
- Bittacus peterseni Kimmins 1938 – South Africa
- Bittacus pieli Navás 1935 – China (Jiangxi)
- Bittacus pignatellii Navás 1932 – Panama
- Bittacus pilicornis Westwood 1846 – Canada, United States
- Bittacus pinguipalpi Wood 1933 – Namibia
- Bittacus pintoi Souza Lopes and Mangabeira 1942 – Brazil
- Bittacus planus Cheng 1949 – China (Shaanxi)
- Bittacus pobeguini (Navás) 1908 – Zaire, Ghana, Ivory Coast, Nigeria, Uganda
- Bittacus pollex Byers and Roggero 1992 – Panama
- Bittacus punctiger Westwood 1846 – United States
- Bittacus rossi Londt 1977 – Zaire
- Bittacus saigusai Miyamoto 1984 – Japan
- Bittacus schoutedeni Esben-Petersen 1913 – Zaire
- Bittacus selysi Esben-Petersen 1917 – South Africa
- Bittacus sinensis Walker 1853 – China (Zhejiang, Jiangsu), Korea, Japan
- Bittacus sinicus Issiki 1931 – China (Sichuan)
- Bittacus sjostedti Weele 1910 – Kenya, Tanzania
- Bittacus smithersi Londt 1972 – South Africa
- Bittacus sobrinus Tjeder 1956 – South Africa
- Bittacus sonani Issiki 1929 – Taiwan
- Bittacus spatulatus Byers 1996 – Costa Rica, Nicaragua
- Bittacus stanleyi Byers 1968 – Zaire, Malawi
- Bittacus stigmaterus Say 1823 – United States
- Bittacus striatus Issiki 1927 – Taiwan
- Bittacus strigosus Hagen 1861 – United States
- Bittacus sylvaticus Byers 1996 – Mexico
- Bittacus takaoensis Miyake 1913 – Japan
- Bittacus taraiensis Penny 1969 – India
- Bittacus tarsalis Miyamoto 1984 – Japan
- Bittacus testaceus Klug 1838 – Zimbabwe, South Africa
- Bittacus texanus Banks 1908 – United States (Kansas, New Mexico, Texas)
- Bittacus tienmushana Cheng 1957 – China (Zhejiang)
- Bittacus tjederi Londt 1970 – South Africa
- Bittacus triangularis Issiki 1929 – Korea, Manchuria
- Bittacus tuxeni Byers 1975 – Guinea, Malawi
- Bittacus ussuriensis Plutenko 1985 – Far Eastern Russia
- Bittacus vexilliferus Byers 1970 – China (Sichuan)
- Bittacus vumbanus Smithers 1960 – Zimbabwe
- Bittacus wahlbergi Londt 1972 – South Africa
- Bittacus walkeri Esben-Petersen 1915 – South Africa
- Bittacus weelei Esben-Petersen 1913 – Angola, Ethiopia, Ghana, Malawi, Nigeria, Tanzania, Uganda, Zaire, Zambia
- Bittacus zambezinus Navás 1931 – Mozambique, Malawi, Zimbabwe, South Africa
- Bittacus zelichi Williner 1990 – Argentina
- Bittacus zulu Londt 1972 – South Africa

=== Extinct species ===
- †Bittacus lepiduscretaceus Li et al. 2018 Burmese amber, Myanmar, Cenomanian
- †Bittacus succinus Carpenter 1954 Baltic amber, Eocene
