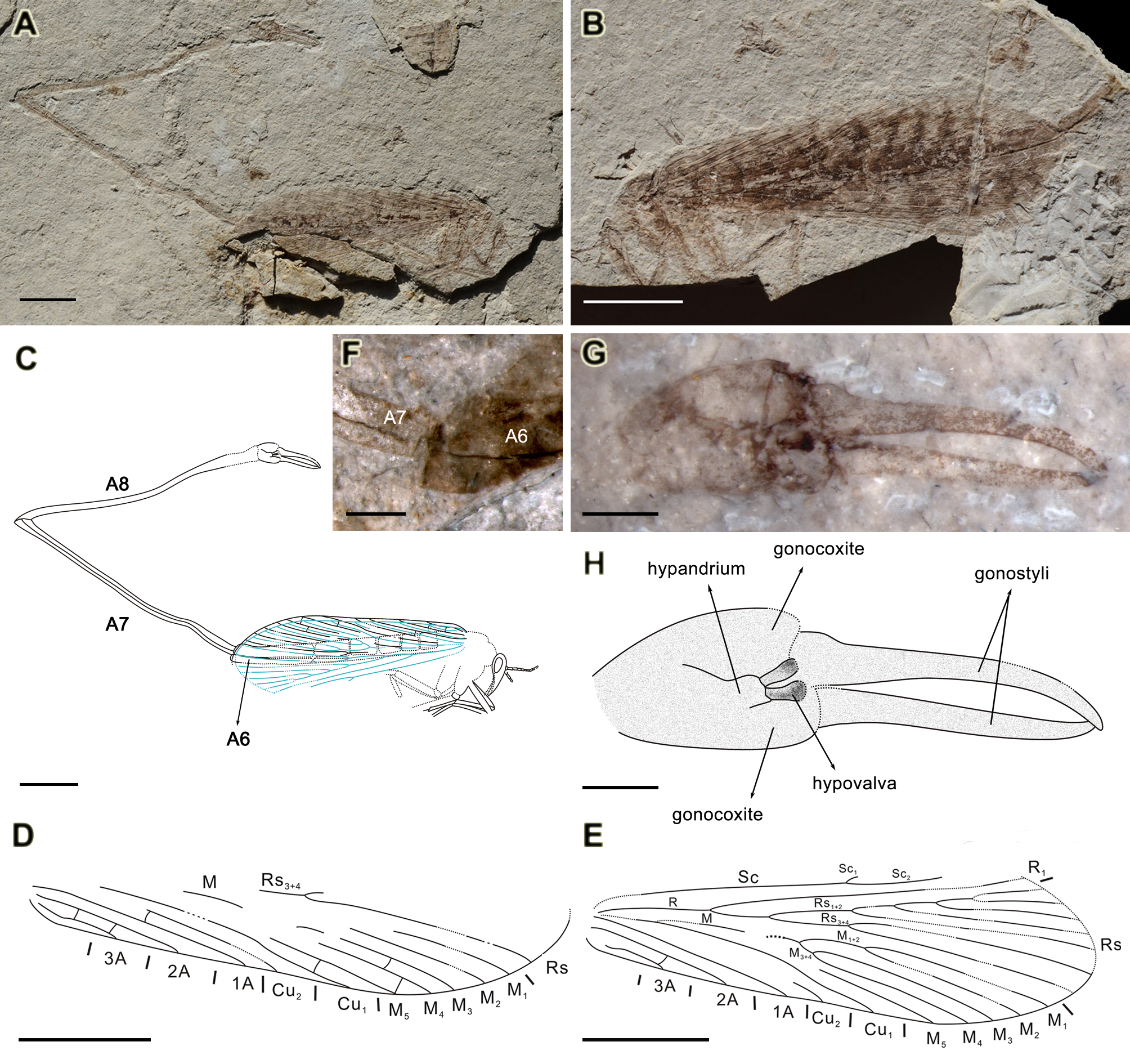
- Holotype

Scientific classification
- Kingdom: Animalia
- Phylum: Arthropoda
- Class: Insecta
- Order: Mecoptera
- Genus: †Fortiholcorpa; Wang, Shih, & Ren, 2013
- Species: †F. paradoxa

Binomial name
- †Fortiholcorpa paradoxa Wang, Shih, & Ren, 2013

= Fortiholcorpa =

Fortiholcorpa Temporal range: Middle Jurassic, 165 Ma

Extinct genus of insects

Fortiholcorpa paradoxa is an extinct species of scorpionfly (Mecoptera) from the Middle Jurassic of China. It is the only known species of its genus.

== Discovery ==
Fortiholcorpa was discovered in the Jiulongshan Formation at Daohugou Village of Ningcheng County in Inner Mongolia, China. The fossil is late Middle Jurassic in age, from the Callovian–Bathonian boundary (c. 165 million years ago). The genus name is a combination of Latin fortis (meaning strong, in reference to the "exceedingly elongate terminal abdominal segments and enlarged genitalia") and Holcorpa another Mecopteran with which Fortiholcorpa shows similarities. The specific epithet paradoxa means amazing, in reference to the very long abdominal segments.

== Description ==
The holotype is a male 73.5 mm in length from head to genital tip. The thorax is poorly preserved, with only the mesothorax and metathorax recognizable. The 7th and 8th abdominal segments are exceedingly long in comparison to other segments. The compound eyes are large and oval-shaped. The antennae are filiform.

== Classification ==
Fortiholcorpa shares several similarities with Holcorpa, a genus formerly placed in the Panorpidae but now considered the sole genus of the family Holcorpidae. However, Fortiholcorpa shows a different a branching pattern of hindwing M vein, and lacks spurs on the sixth abdominal segment. As such, the describers placed Fortiholcorpa as incertae sedis (uncertain placement) within Mecoptera.
