= Haifanggou Formation =

Geological formation in China

- Stratigraphic range: Callovian-Oxfordian; ~165–160 Ma
- Type: Geological formation
- Underlies: Tiaojishan Formation
- Overlies: Beipiao Formation (Separated by an unconformity)

Lithology
- Primary: Conglomerate
- Other: Sandstone, mudstone, shale, coal

Location
- Coordinates: 41.8°N 120.8°E
- Approximate paleocoordinates: 44.5°N 126.0°E
- Region: Inner Mongolia
- Country: China

Type section
- Named for: Haifanggou
- Named by: Liaoning Stratigraphic Group
- Year defined: 1978
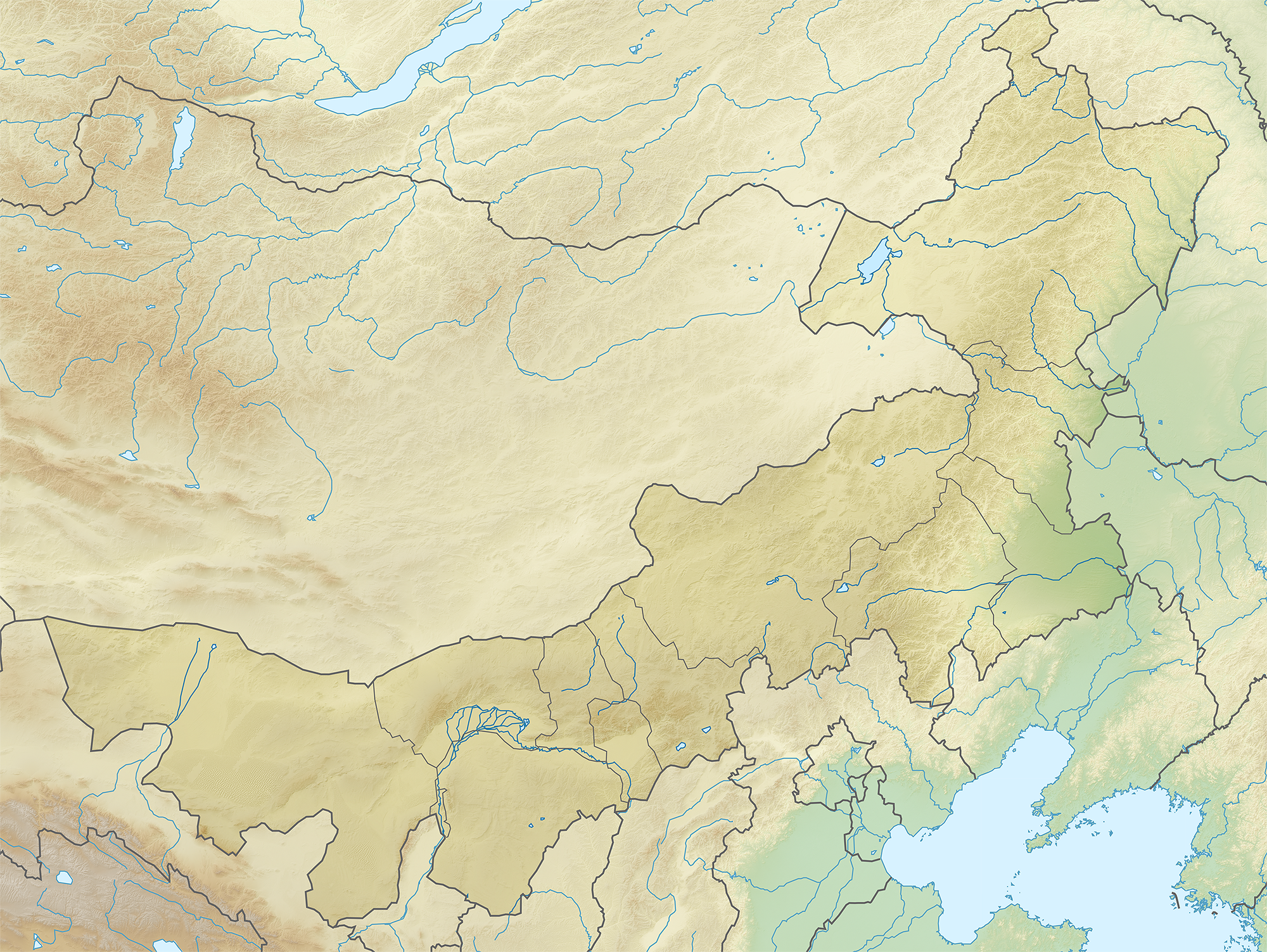
- Haifanggou Formation (China) Haifanggou Formation (Inner Mongolia)

The Haifanggou Formation (simplified Chinese: 海房沟组; traditional Chinese: 海房溝組; pinyin: Hǎifánggōu zǔ), also known as the Jiulongshan Formation (simplified Chinese: 九龙山组; traditional Chinese: 九龍山組; pinyin: Jiǔlóngshān zǔ), is a fossil-bearing rock deposit located near Daohugou (simplified Chinese: 道虎沟; traditional Chinese: 道虎溝) village of Ningcheng County, in Inner Mongolia, northeastern China.

The formation consists of coarse conglomerates, sandstone, mudstone, and thin coal layers deposited in deltaic and lacustrine environments.

The formation dates to the Callovian of the Middle Jurassic to the Oxfordian of the Late Jurassic.

The most prominent locality of the Haifanggou Formation are the Daohugou Beds, located near the village of Daohugou in southeastern Inner Mongolia. Other localities include Wuhuaxigou, Chentaizi, Jiangzhangzi, Wubaiding, Guancaishan, Haifenggou, Fanzhangzi, and Zhuanshanzi.

== Dating ==
=== Daohugou bed ===
The age of the Daohugou bed has been debated, and a number of studies, using different methodologies, have reached conflicting conclusions. Various papers have placed the fossils here as being anywhere from the Middle Jurassic period (169 million years ago) to the Early Cretaceous period (122 ma). One of the first studies on the age of the Daohugou beds, published in 2004 by He et al., found them to be Early Cretaceous, only a few million years older than the overlying Jehol beds of the Yixian Formation. The 2004 study primarily used Argon–argon dating of a tuff within the Daohugou Beds to determine its age.

However, subsequent studies cast doubt on this relatively recent age. In a 2006 study, Gao & Ren criticized He et al. for not including enough specifics and detail in their paper, and also took issue with their radiometric dating of the Daohugou tuff. The tuff, Gao and Ren argued, contains crystals with a variety of diverse radiometric ages, some up to a billion years old, so using dates from only a few of these crystals could not determine the overall age of the deposits. Gao and Ren went on to defend a Middle Jurassic age for the beds based on biostratigraphy (the use of index fossils), and the bed's relationship to a layer that is known to mark the Middle Jurassic-Late Jurassic boundary.

Another study, published in 2006 by Wang et al., argued that the 159-164 million years old Tiaojishan Formation underlies, rather than overlies, the Daohugou Beds. Unlike the earlier study by Gao and Ren, Wang et al. found an overall similarity between the fossil animals found in the Daohugou Beds and those from the Yixian Formation. The authors stated that

"vertebrate fossils such as Liaoxitriton, Jeholopterus and feathered maniraptorans show much resemblance to those of the Yixian Formation. In other words, despite the absence of Lycoptera, a typical fish of the Jehol Biota, the Daohugou vertebrate assemblage is closer to that of the Early Cretaceous Jehol Biota than to any other biota."

Wang et al. concluded that the Daohugou probably represents the earliest evolutionary stages of the Jehol Biota, and that it "belongs to the same cycle of volcanism and sedimentation as the Yixian Formation of the Jehol Group." However, a later study by Ji et al. argued that the key indicator of the Jehol biota are the index fossils Peipiaosteus and Lycoptera. Under this definition, the earliest evolutionary stage of the Jehol Biota is represented by the Huajiying Formation, and the Daohugou Formation is excluded due to the absence of Lycoptera fossils. Later in 2006, Liu et al. published their own study of the age of the Daohugou beds, this time using Zircon Uranium-lead dating on the volcanic rocks overlying and underlying salamander-bearing layers (salamanders are often used as index fossils). Liu et al. found that the beds formed between 164 and 158 million years ago, in the Middle to Late Jurassic. A 2012 study by Gao and Shubin agreed with this assessment, and reported an Argon–argon date of 164 plus or minus 4 million years ago for the Daohugou horizon.

== Animal fossil content ==
=== Arthropods ===
At least 760 insect species have been described from the Haifanggou Formation and associated deposits, making it one of the most diverse insect-bearing strata from the Jurassic period.

Insects
Genus	Species	Year	Abundance	Notes	Images
Ahirmoneura	A. neimengguensis	2008		A tangle-veined fly	Juracimbrophlebia Mongolarachne
Aneuroderma	A. oiodes	2021	2 specimens	An earwig	Juracimbrophlebia Mongolarachne
Applanatiforceps	A. angustus	2023	3 specimens	An earwig	Juracimbrophlebia Mongolarachne
Archaboilus	A. musicus	2012	1 specimen	A stem-katydid	Juracimbrophlebia Mongolarachne
Ekpagloderma	E. gracilentum	2023	1 specimen	An earwig	Juracimbrophlebia Mongolarachne
Formosibittacus	F. macularis	2008	1 specimen	A hangingfly	Juracimbrophlebia Mongolarachne
Fortiholcorpa	F. paradoxa	2013	1 specimen	A Mecopteran	Juracimbrophlebia Mongolarachne
Juracimbrophlebia	J. ginkgofolia	2012	1 specimen	A hangingfly	Juracimbrophlebia Mongolarachne
Jurahylobittacus	J. astictus	2008	1 specimen	A hangingfly	Juracimbrophlebia Mongolarachne
Mesobunus	M. dunlopi	2012	1 specimen	A harvestman	Juracimbrophlebia Mongolarachne
Miriholcorpa	M. forcipata	2013	1 specimen	A Mecopteran	Juracimbrophlebia Mongolarachne
Mongolarachne	M. jurassica	2011		A spider	Juracimbrophlebia Mongolarachne
Mongolbittacus	M. daohugoensis	2007	1 specimen	A hangingfly	Juracimbrophlebia Mongolarachne
Pseudomantina	P. baijuyii	2023		A cockroach	Juracimbrophlebia Mongolarachne
Pycnopolystoechotes	P. striatus	2023		A lacewing	Juracimbrophlebia Mongolarachne
Sinojuraphis	S. ningchengensis	2008		An aphid	Juracimbrophlebia Mongolarachne
Sinopalaeodermata	S. concavum	2021	1 specimen	An earwig	Juracimbrophlebia Mongolarachne
Stictopolystoechotes	S. sparsulus	2023		A lacewing	Juracimbrophlebia Mongolarachne

=== Vertebrates ===
Based largely on.

=== Amphibians ===
Amphibians of the Haifanggou Formation
Genus	Species	Locality	Material	Notes	Images
Chunerpeton	C. tianyiensis		A preserved skeleton	A salamander	Chunerpeton Pangerpeton
Jeholotriton	J. paradoxus			A salamander	Chunerpeton Pangerpeton
Neimengtriton	N. daohugouensis			A salamander	Chunerpeton Pangerpeton
Pangerpeton	P. sinensis			A salamander	Chunerpeton Pangerpeton

=== Dinosaurs ===
Dinosaurs of the Haifanggou Formation
Genus	Species	Locality	Material	Notes	Images
Pedopenna	P. daohugouensis			A maniraptoran dinosaur	
Epidexipteryx	E. hui			A scansoriopterygid dinosaur	
Epidendrosaurus	E. ningchengensis			A scansoriopterygid dinosaur	

=== Pterosaurs ===
Pterosaurs of the Haifanggou Formation
Genus	Species	Locality	Material	Notes	Images
Daohugoupterus	D. delicatus			A pterosaur	Jeholopterus Liaodactylus
Jeholopterus	J. ningchengensis			An anurognathid pterosaur	Jeholopterus Liaodactylus
Liaodactylus	L. primus			A ctenochasmid pterosaur	Jeholopterus Liaodactylus
Pterorhynchus	P. wellnhoferi			A darwinopteran pterosaur	Jeholopterus Liaodactylus

=== Mammaliforms ===
Mammaliforms of the Haifanggou Formation
Genus	Species	Locality	Material	Notes	Images
Agilodocodon	A, scansorius			A docodont mammaliaform	Agilodocodon Castorocauda Megaconus Pseudotribos Volaticotherium
Castorocauda	C. lutrasimilis			An aquatic docodont mammaliaform	Agilodocodon Castorocauda Megaconus Pseudotribos Volaticotherium
Microdocodon	M. gracilis			A docodont mammaliaform	Agilodocodon Castorocauda Megaconus Pseudotribos Volaticotherium
Megaconus	M. mammaliaformis			A possible allotherian mammal	Agilodocodon Castorocauda Megaconus Pseudotribos Volaticotherium
Mirusodens	M. caii			an arboreal/climbing euharamiyidan mammal/mammaliaform	Agilodocodon Castorocauda Megaconus Pseudotribos Volaticotherium
Pseudotribos	P. robustus			A shuotheriid mammaliaform	Agilodocodon Castorocauda Megaconus Pseudotribos Volaticotherium
Volaticotherium	V. antiquum			A gliding eutriconodont mammal	Agilodocodon Castorocauda Megaconus Pseudotribos Volaticotherium

=== Fish ===
Fish of the Haifanggou Formation
Genus	Species	Locality	Material	Notes	Images
Liaosteus	L. hongi			A peipiaosteid fish	Yanliaomyzon
Yanliaomyzon	Y. ingensdentes			A lamprey	Yanliaomyzon

== Flora ==
Fossil plants
Genus	Species	State	Abundance	Notes	Images
Coniopteris	C. bella	Liaoning		A fern	
Coniopteris	C. burejensis	Liaoning		A fern	
Coniopteris	C. haifanggouensis			A fern	
Sequoia	S. jeholensis	Ningcheng		The earliest known redwood tree	
Schmeissneria	S. sinensis	Liaoning		Uncertain plant originally described as angiosperm.	
Xingxueanthus	X. sinensis	Liaoning		Uncertain plant originally described as angiosperm.	
Euanthus	E. panii	Liaoning		Uncertain plant originally described as angiosperm.	

== See also ==
- Geology of Inner Mongolia
- Jurassic Asia and Jurassic System of Asia — period's Asian prehistoric life, geological formations, fossil record
- Yixian Formation
- Callovian formations
  - Tiourarén Formation, fossiliferous formation of Niger
  - Qiketai, Toutunhe, Shishugou and Qigu Formations, fossiliferous formations of the Junggar Basin, Xinjiang
- Oxfordian formations
  - Oxford Clay, England
  - Tendaguru Formation, fossiliferous formation of Tanzania
  - Cañadón Calcáreo Formation, fossiliferous formation of the Cañadón Asfalto Basin, Argentina
