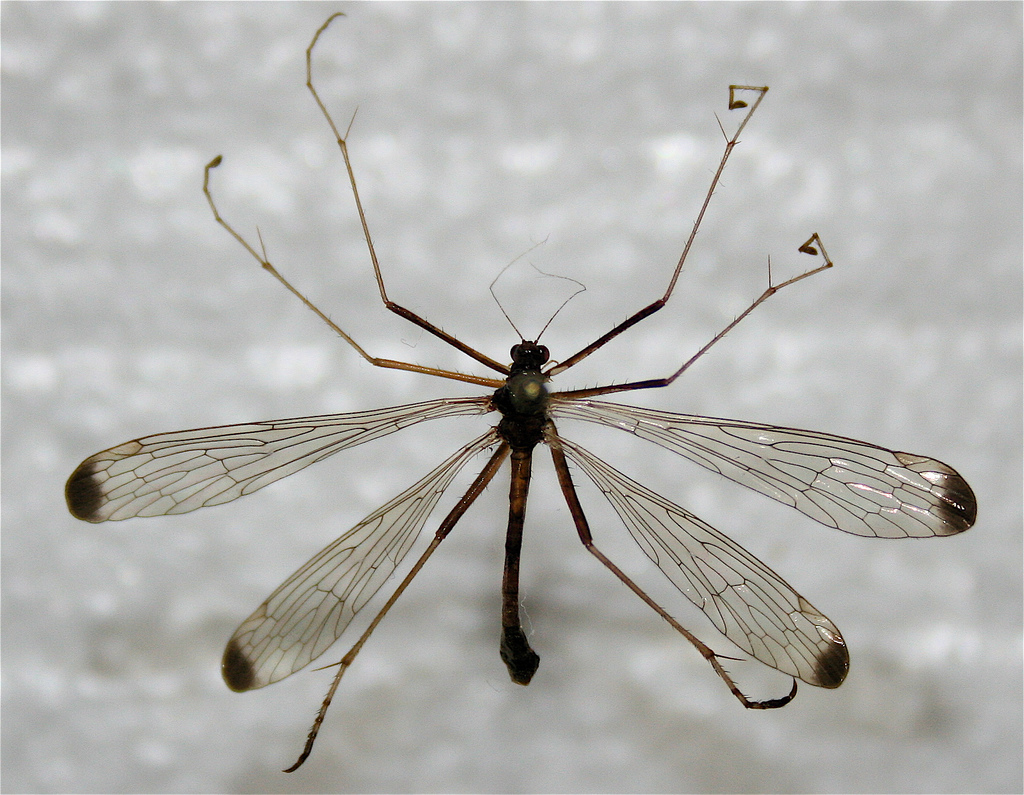
- Hylobittacus apicalis, Michigan, USA

Scientific classification
- Kingdom: Animalia
- Phylum: Arthropoda
- Class: Insecta
- Order: Mecoptera
- Infraorder: Raptipeda
- Family: Bittacidae; Handlirsch, 1906

Genera
- See text

Diversity
- 16 genera, ca. 170 species

= Hangingfly =

Hangingfly Temporal range: Late Triassic–Recent

Family of insects

Bittacidae is a family of scorpionflies commonly called hangingflies or hanging scorpionflies.

The genus Bittacus, comprising approximately 75% of all species within the family, occurs worldwide. Other genera are mostly confined to South America or Australia. Members of this family may be confused with crane flies, in the order Diptera, but can be distinguished by their two pairs of wings and lack of halteres.

They are distinguished in the fact that during mating the male captures a prey insect and offers it to the female as a nuptial gift. The larger the prey item is, the more receptive the female will be to mating.

== Genera ==
This list is based on The World Checklist of extant Mecoptera Species. Presumably complete up to 1997, it is updated as needed. The number of species in each genus are in parentheses. A number of extinct(†) genera have been described from the fossil record.

- Anabittacus (1) Kimmins, 1929 (Chile)
- Anomalobittacus (1) Kimmins, 1928 (South Africa)
- Apterobittacus (1) MacLachlan, 1893 (California)
- Austrobittacus (1) Riek, 1954 (Australia)
- Bittacus (124) Latreille, 1805 (worldwide)
- Edriobittacus (1) Byers, 1974 (Australia)
- Harpobittacus (12) Gerstaecker, 1885 (Australia)
- Hylobittacus (1) Byers, 1979 (United States, Mexico + fossil species from the Eocene Bitterfield and Baltic amber of Europe)
- Issikiella (5) Byers, 1972 (South America)
- Kalobittacus (8) Esben-Petersen, 1914 (Central America)
- Nannobittacus (4) Esben-Petersen, 1927 (Brazil to Panama)
- Neobittacus (2) Esben-Petersen, 1914 (Brazil)
- Orobittacus Villegas & Byers, 1982 (California)
- Pazius (8) Navás, 1913 (Brazil to Panama)
- Symbittacus Byers, 1986 (Australia)
- Tytthobittacus Smithers, 1973 (Australia + fossil species from the Early Cretaceous (Berriasian) aged Purbeck Group)

Extinct genera

- †Antiquanabittacus (1) Petrulevicius and Jarzembowski 2004 Weald Clay, United Kingdom, Early Cretaceous (Barremian)
- †Archebittacus (1) Riek, 1955 (Mount Crosby Formation, Australia, Late Triassic (Norian)
- †Asiobittacus (1) Novokshonov 1993 Sagul Formation, Kyrgyzstan, Early Jurassic (Toarcian)
- †Baissobittacus (1) Novokshonov 1997 Zaza Formation, Russia, Early Cretaceous (Aptian)
- †Burmobittacus (1) Zhao et al. 2016 Burmese amber, Myanmar, mid Cretaceous (Albian-Cenomanian)
- †Composibittacus (2) Liu et al. 2016 Daohugou, China, Middle Jurassic (Callovian)
- †Cretobittacus (1) Novokshonov 1993 Zaza Formation, Russia, Aptian
- †Decoribittacus (2) Li and Ren 2009 Daohugou, China, Callovian
- †Exilibittacus (3) Yang et al. 2012 Daohugou, China, Callovian
- †Formosibittacus (1) Li, Ren & Shih, 2008 Daohugou, China, Callovian
- †Haplobittacus (1) Bode 1953 Posidonia Shale, Germany, Toarcian)
- †Jurahylobittacus (1) Li, Ren & Shih, 2008 Daohugou, China, Callovian
- †Karattacus (2) Novokshonov 1997 Daohugou, China, Callovian Karabastau Formation, Kazakhstan, Late Jurassic
- †Liaobittacus (1) Ren 1993 Haifanggou Formation, China, Callovian
- †Mesobittacus (4) Handlirsch 1939 Posidonia Shale, "Green Series", Germany, Toarcian, Itat Formation, Russia, Middle Jurassic (Bathonian)
- †Mongolbittacus (3) Petrulevicius, Huang & Ren, 2007 Daohugou, China, Callovian
- †Neorthophlebia (12) Handlirsch 1906 Dzhil Formation, Kyrgyzstan, Early Jurassic (Hettangian-Sinemurian) Posidonia Shale, "Green Series", Germany, Sulyukta Formation, Kyrgyzstan, Toarcian, Tugnuy Formation, Russia, Upper Jurassic, Tuodian Formation, China, Late Jurassic (Oxfordian)
- †Orobittacus (2) Villegas and Byers 1981 Karabastau Formation, Kazakhstan, Late Jurassic, Sharteg, Mongolia, Late Jurassic (Tithonian)
- †Orthobittacus (4) Willmann 1989 Kyzyl-Kiya, Kyrgyzstan, Early Jurassic (Pliensbachian), Daohugou, China, Callovian, Karabastau Formation, Kazakhstan, Late Jurassic
- †Palaeobittacus (1) Carpenter 1928 Green River Formation, Colorado, Eocene
- †Parabittacus (2) Handlirsch 1939 Posidonia Shale, "Green Series", Germany, Toarcian
- †Pleobittacus (1) Bode 1953 Posidonia Shale, Germany, Toarcian
- †Plesiobittacus (1) Novokshonov 1997 Sagul Formation, Kyrgyzstan, Toarcian
- †Preanabittacus (2) Novokshonov 1993 Daohugou, China, Callovian Karabastau Formation, Kazakhstan, Late Jurassic
- †Probittacus (1) Martynov 1927 Karabastau Formation, Kazakhstan, Late Jurassic
- †Prohylobittacus (1) Novokshonov 1993 Karabastau Formation, Kazakhstan, Late Jurassic
- †Scharabittacus (3) Novokshonov 1993 Karabastau Formation, Kazakhstan, Late Jurassic Sharteg, Mongolia, Tithonian
- †Sibirobittacus (3) Sukacheva 1990 Karabastau Formation, Kazakhstan, Late Jurassic Glushkovo Formation, Russia, Tithonian, Yixian Formation, China, Aptian
