= Tiki Formation =

Geologic formation in India

- Stratigraphic range: Carnian-Norian
- Type: Geological formation
- Unit of: Gondwana Group
- Sub-units: Lower & Upper members
- Underlies: Unconformity with the Parsora Formation
- Overlies: Karki Formation

Lithology
- Primary: Mudstone
- Other: Claystone, sandstone

Location
- Coordinates: 23.9°N 81.4°E
- Approximate paleocoordinates: 42.6°S 51.1°E
- Region: Madhya Pradesh
- Country: India

Type section
- Named for: Tiki village
- Tiki Formation (India) Tiki Formation (Madhya Pradesh)

The Tiki Formation is a Late Triassic (Carnian to Norian) geologic formation in Madhya Pradesh, northern India. Dinosaur remains are among the fossils that have been recovered from the formation, although none have yet been referred to a specific genus. Phytosaur remains attributable to the genus Volcanosuchus have also been found in the Tiki Formation.

== Paleobiota ==
Color key
Taxon	Reclassified taxon	Taxon falsely reported as present	Dubious taxon or junior synonym	Ichnotaxon	Ootaxon	Morphotaxon

Notes
Uncertain or tentative taxa are in small text; ~~crossed out~~ taxa are discredited.

=== Reptiles ===
==== Dinosauromorphs ====
Dinosaurs of the Tiki Formation
Genus	Species	Material	Notes
Herrerasauridae	Indeterminate	Numerous small partial and complete vertebrae and partial limb bones	An indeterminate herrerasaurid, closely related to Gnathovorax.
Sauropodomorpha	Indeterminate	Two semi-articulated sacral vertebrae and an astragalus	An indeterminate sauropodomorph, closely related to Buriolestes and Eoraptor.
Theropoda	Indeterminate	Five teeth and phalanx	An indeterminate theropod
Ornithischia	Indeterminate	Teeth	An indeterminate putative ornithischian
Rewasaurus	R. minori	A fragmentary skull	A silesaurid
Silesauridae indet.	Indeterminate	Two partial femora	A silesaurid

==== Non-dinosaur archosaurs ====
Non-dinosaur archosaurs of the Tiki Formation
Genus	Species	Material	Notes
Tikisuchus	T. romeri	Partial skull and skeleton of a young individual	A putative rauisuchid
Desmatosuchinae	Indeterminate	Osteoderms	An indeterminate aetosaur
Pseudosuchia	Indeterminate		An indeterminate pseudosuchian

==== Non-archosaur reptiles ====
Non-archosaur reptiles of the Tiki Formation
Genus	Species	Material	Notes
Colossosuchus	C. techniensis	Numerous skulls and postcranial material from several individuals	A large sized phytosaur
Volcanosuchus	V. statisticae	A skull	A phytosaur
Parasuchus	P. hislopi	Skull	A phytosaur
Phytosauria	Indeterminate	At least 52 specimens	Indeterminate phytosaurs
Clevosaurus	C. nicholsi	Jaw fragments	A clevosaurid rhynchocephalian
Sphenodontia	Indeterminate		Indeterminate rhynchocephalian
Hyperodapedon	H. huxleyi	Rare maxillary tooth plate	A large sized hyperodapedontine rhynchosaur
Hyperodapedon	H. tikiensis	Various cranial and postcranial elements	A hyperodapedontine rhynchosaur
Azendohsaurus	A. sp.	Teeth	An azendohsaurid allokotosaur
Protecovasaurus	P. sp.	Teeth	An indeterminate diapsid
Galtonia	G. sp.	Teeth	An indeterminate diapsid

=== Synapsids ===
==== Cynodont ====
Cynodonts of the Tiki Formation
Genus	Species	Material	Notes
Gondwanadon	G. tapani	A single molar	A morganucodont
Inditherium	I. floris	Three postcanine teeth	A dromatheriid
Rewaconodon	R. indicus	A partial jaw and three postcanine teeth	A dromatheriid
Rewaconodon	R. tikiensis		A dromatheriid
Ruberodon	R. roychowdhurii	Five partial jaws	A traversodontid
Tikiodon	T. cromptoni	A single postcanine tooth	A mammaliamorph
Tikitherium	T. copei	A single postcanine tooth	A mammaliaform. Initially described as a basal mammaliaform related to Docodonta, but later redescribed as a Neogene shrew fossil that was reworked into the older deposit.
Cynodontia indet.			

=== Amphibians ===
==== Temnospondyls ====
Temnospondyls of the Tiki Formation
Genus	Species	Material	Notes
Compsocerops	C. tikiensis		A chigutisaurid temnospondyl
Metoposaurus	M. sp.		A metoposaurid temnospondyl
Panthasaurus	P. maleriensis		A metoposaurid temnospondyl
Metoposauridae	Indeterminate	At least 655 specimens	An indeterminate metoposaurid

==== Other Amphibians ====
Other Amphibians of the Tiki Formation
Genus	Species	Material	Notes
Eodiscoglossus	E. sp	An incomplete jaw	A discoglossid frog

=== Actinopterygiis ===
Actinopterygiis of the Tiki Formation
Genus	Species	Material	Notes
Gnathorhiza	G. sp.	Teeth	A gnathorhizid lungfish
Ptychoceratodus	P. oldhami	Teeth	A ptychoceratodontid lungfish
Actinopterygii	Indeterminate		An indeterminate actinopterygian
Coelacanthidae	Indeterminate		An indeterminate coelacanth

=== Chondrichthyes ===
Chondrichthyes of the Tiki Formation
Genus	Species	Material	Notes
Cladodus	C. sp.	Teeth	A ctenacanth
Lonchidion	L. estesi		A hybodont
Lonchidion	L. encumbens		A hybodont
Mooreodontus	M. indicus	Teeth	A xenacanthid
Mooreodontus	M. jaini	Teeth	A xenacanthid
Pristrisodus	P. tikiensis	Teeth	A hybodont, formerly known as Parvodus tikiensis and Lissodus duffini.
Tikiodontus	T. asymmetricus	Teeth	A xenacanthid

=== Flora ===
Flora of the Tiki Formation
Genus	Species	Material	Notes
Pagiophyllum	P. bosei		A pinid
Yabeiella	Y. indica		A cycadeoid
Lepidopteris	L. stormbergensis		A member of Peltaspermaceae
Desmiophyllum	D. singhii		A member of Coniferales
Elatocladus	E. raoi		A member of Coniferales
Elatocladus	E. sp.		A member of Coniferales
Elatocladus	E. denticulatus		A member of Coniferales
Dicroidium	D. coriaceum		A member of Corystospermales
Dicroidium	D. giarensis		A member of Corystospermales
Dicroidium	D. zuberi		A member of Corystospermales
Dicroidium	D. cf. odontopteroides		A member of Corystospermales
Dicroidium	D. sp.		A member of Corystospermales
Xylopteris	X. sp.		A member of Corystospermales
Sphenobaiera	S. janarensis		A member of Ginkgoales
Baiera	B. sp.		A member of Ginkgoales
Thinnfeldia	T. hughesi		A pteridosperm
Baieroxylon	B. cicatricum		A member of Ginkgoales

== Correlations ==
The Tiki Formation is considered a temporal equivalent of the Lower Maleri Formation. The majority of the Tiki Formation correlates with the Ischigualasto Formation of Argentina, the upper part of the Santa Maria Formation, and the overlying lower Caturrita Formation of Brazil, the Isalo II Beds of Madagascar, Lossiemouth Sandstone of Scotland, and the lower Tecovas Formation of the Chinle Group of North America.

== See also ==
- List of dinosaur-bearing rock formations
  - List of stratigraphic units with indeterminate dinosaur fossils
