= Wareolestes =

Wareolestes Temporal range: Bathonian ~167–165 Ma

Scientific classification
- Kingdom: Animalia
- Phylum: Chordata
- Clade: Synapsida
- Clade: Therapsida
- Clade: Cynodontia
- Clade: Mammaliaformes
- Order: †Morganucodonta
- Family: †Megazostrodontidae
- Genus: †Wareolestes

Type species
- Wareolestes rex Freeman, 1979

Extinct genus of mammaliaforms

Wareolestes rex ("Ware's Brigand king") is a mammaliaform from the Middle Jurassic (Bathonian) rocks of England and Scotland. It was originally known from isolated teeth from England, before a more complete jaw with teeth was found in the Kilmaluag Formation of Skye, Scotland.

== Etymology ==
Wareolestes rex was named by Eric Freeman, who named it for Dr. Martin Ware "in recognition of this major contribution" to Freeman's successful work. The second part of the generic name, lestes, comes from the Greek for brigand. The species name rex, Latin for king, is both in recognition of the relatively large size of this Mesozoic mammaliaform, and a pun on the name of Mr E. J. King.

== Discovery ==
Wareolestes rex was first found in and named from the Forest Marble Formation of Kirtlington, Oxfordshire, England. The holotype is a single molar tooth, originally described as a lower molar, but later argued to be an upper molar. Only a few more single teeth were found from the same site in the subsequent years.

In 2017 a more complete Wareolestes was recovered from the Isle of Skye in Scotland. This fossil was an almost complete lower jaw, with some permanent adult teeth and several unerupted adult teeth still inside the jaw, as revealed by microCT scanning. This fossil also confirmed the original interpretation of the holotype tooth as being a lower molar.

== Biology ==
The Scottish fossil Wareolestes, a dentary (lower jaw) had three permanent adult molar teeth, and several unerupted adult premolar teeth still inside the jaw below the gumline. This shows Wareolestes replaced its teeth in the modern mammalian way (diphyodonty), an important step in the evolution of true mammal characteristics. It also suggests that Wareolestes produced milk to feed its young. This is because diphyodonty is associated with replacing smaller 'milk' teeth, present when an animal is young and growing quickly (and being fed on milk), with larger adult teeth that allow it to process adult food and be weaned.

The environment in which Wareolestes is found is brackish and lagoonal. These lagoons were populated by crocodiles, turtles, and basal squamates and salamanders.

== Classification ==
Wareolestes is a mammaliaform, but it was not a true or crown-group mammal. This is because, as a morganucodontid, it probably retained both the mammalian and non mammalian jaw joint, and also retained the postdentary bones. It belongs in the order Morganucodonta, and the family Megazostrodontidae. Mammaliaforms are often referred to as mammals colloquially, even though this is not considered technically correct by palaeontologists. They are also often referred to as stem mammals, or Mesozoic mammals.

Phylogeny

- Mammaliaformes
  - Adelobasileus
  - - Sinoconodon
    - - - Morganucodonta
          - Morganucodontidae
          - Megazostrodontidae
      - - Haramiyida
        - - - Docodonta
          - - Hadrocodium
            - Mammalia

== See also ==
- Evolution of mammals
