= Eozostrodon =

Eozostrodon Temporal range: Rhaetian ~210–202 Ma

Scientific classification
- Kingdom: Animalia
- Phylum: Chordata
- Clade: Synapsida
- Clade: Therapsida
- Clade: Cynodontia
- Clade: Mammaliaformes
- Order: †Morganucodonta
- Family: †Morganucodontidae
- Genus: †Eozostrodon; Parrington, 1941

Type species
- Eozostrodon parvus Parrington, 1941

Extinct genus of mammaliaforms

Eozostrodon is an extinct morganucodont mammaliaform. It lived during the Rhaetian stage of the Late Triassic. Eozostrodon is known from disarticulated teeth from South West England and estimated to have been less than 10 cm (3.9 in) in head–body length, slightly smaller than the similar-proportioned Megazostrodon.

Eozostrodon was described on the basis of two teeth discovered in a quarry near Frome in Somerset, England, each originally assigned to separate species E. parvus and E. problematicus. The latter was synonymized in 1971. The identity of and status of Eozostrodon is controversial. Kühne considered Eozostrodon to be "one and the same" with Morganucodon which he described from thousands of fossils he collected in Wales, albeit after the published description of Eozostrodon, claiming "...for a number of good reasons Morganucodon ought to be used, the name of Eozostrodon being used for sentimental reasons only or because of ignorance." Jenkins and Crompton in 1979 argued Morganucodon was a subjective synonym of Eozostrodon, yet Clemens (1979) argued for the distinction. A more recent publication again distinguished the two, noting that Eozostrodon differs from M. watsoni in relative size and shape of premolar structures.

Its teeth were typical for an early mammaliaform, being differentiated into premolars and molars with triangular cusps.
