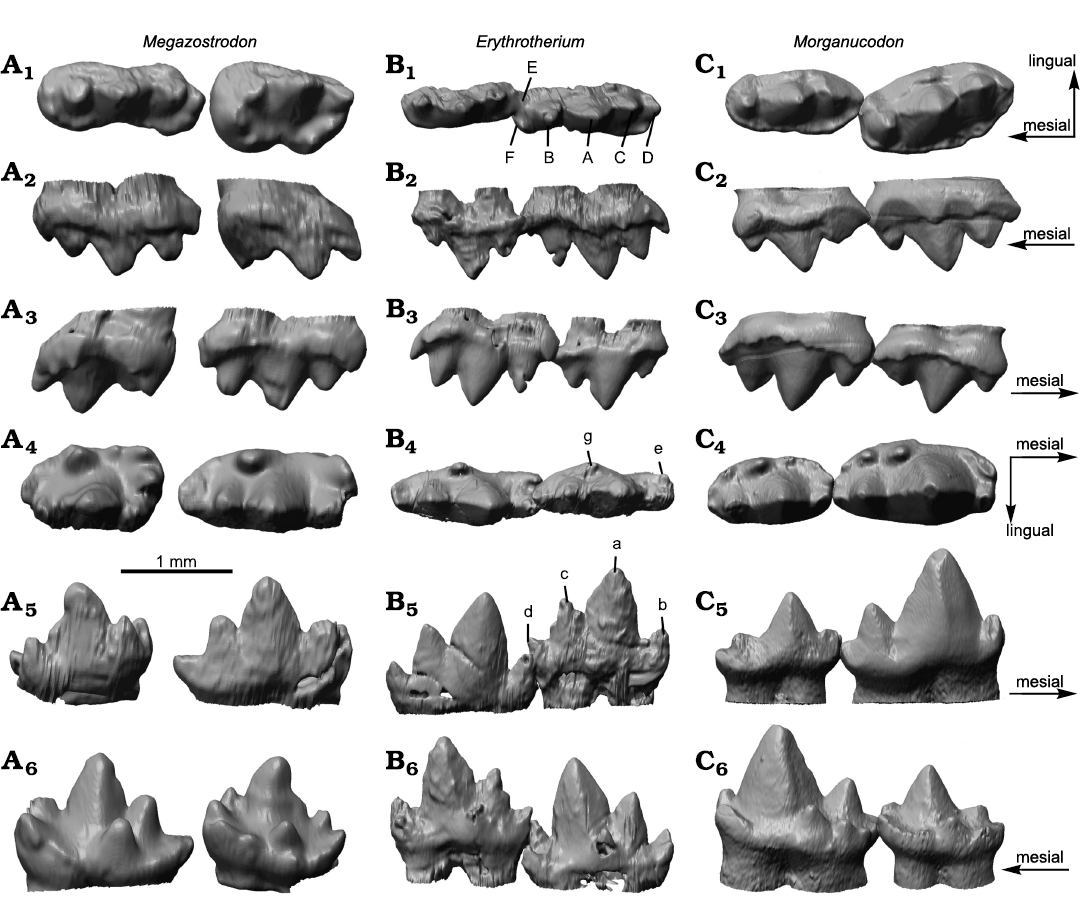
- Molariforms of Megazostrodon (A), Erythrotherium (B) and Morganucodon (C)

Scientific classification
- Domain: Eukaryota
- Kingdom: Animalia
- Phylum: Chordata
- Clade: Synapsida
- Clade: Therapsida
- Clade: Cynodontia
- Clade: Mammaliaformes
- Order: †Morganucodonta
- Family: †Morganucodontidae
- Genus: †Erythrotherium; Crompton, 1964

Type species
- Erythrotherium parringtoni Crompton, 1964

= Erythrotherium =

Erythrotherium Temporal range: 210–182 Ma

Extinct genus of mammaliaforms

Erythrotherium (meaning "red beast") is an extinct genus of basal mammaliaforms from the Lower Jurassic of South Africa. It is related to Morganucodon. Only one species is recorded, Erythrotherium parringtoni.

The single jaw of Erythrotherium was found in the matrix surrounding a dinosaur fossil, by the person preparing the dinosaur, Mr C. Gow.
