= Cherwellia =

Cherwellia Temporal range: Bathonian, ~167.7–164.7 Ma

Scientific classification
- Domain: Eukaryota
- Kingdom: Animalia
- Phylum: Chordata
- Clade: Synapsida
- Clade: Therapsida
- Clade: Cynodontia
- Clade: Mammaliaformes
- Order: †Morganucodonta (?)
- Genus: †Cherwellia; Butler & Sigogneau-Russell, 2016
- Species: †C. leei

Binomial name
- †Cherwellia leei Butler & Sigogneau-Russell, 2016

Extinct genus of mammaliaforms

Cherwellia is an extinct genus of mammaliaforms, possibly belonging to Morganucodonta, that lived in what is now England during the Middle Jurassic. The type and only known species is Cherwellia leei. It was first described in 2016 by Percy M. Butler and Denise Sigogneau-Russell from a single lower molar found at the Kirtlington Quarry of the Forest Marble Formation.

== Etymology ==
The generic epithet Cherwellia comes from the River Cherwell, whereas the specific epithet leei honours the British artist A. J. Lee.
