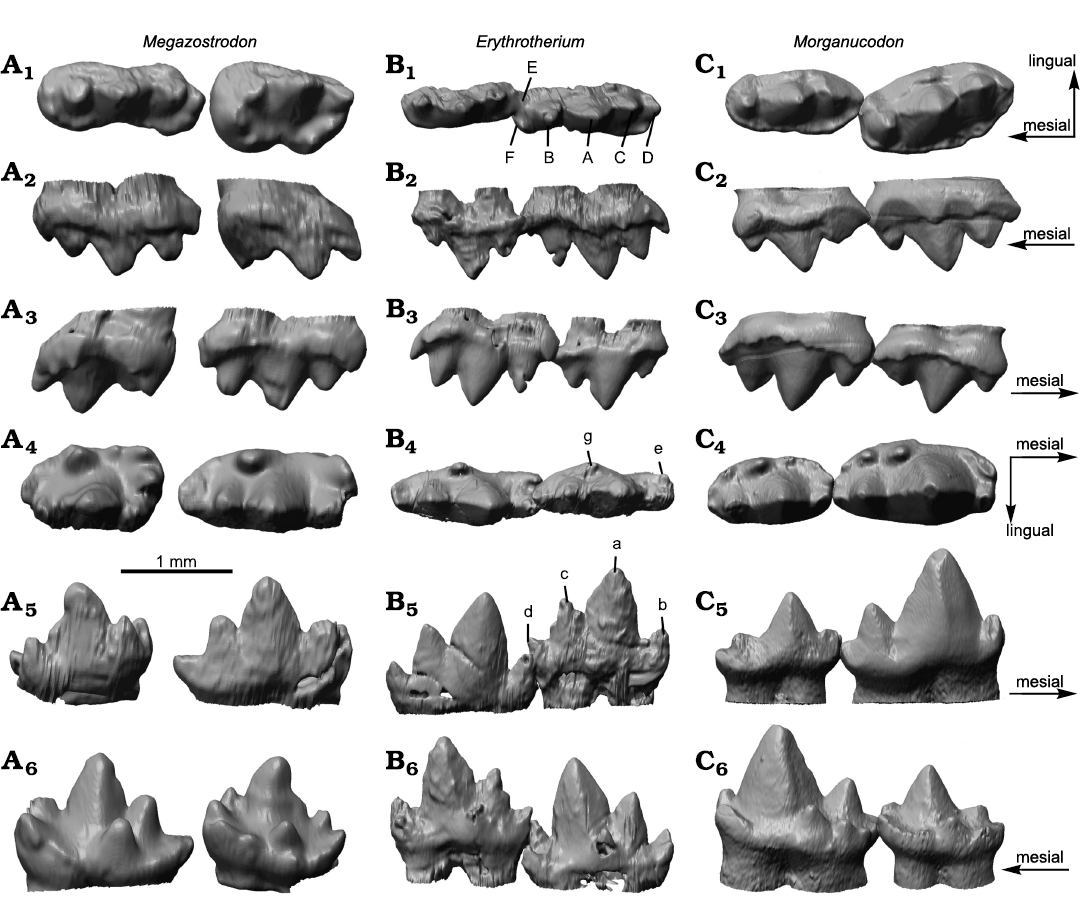
- Molariforms of Megazostrodon (A), Erythrotherium (B) and Morganucodon (C)

Scientific classification
- Kingdom: Animalia
- Phylum: Chordata
- Clade: Synapsida
- Clade: Therapsida
- Clade: Cynodontia
- Clade: Mammaliaformes
- Order: †Morganucodonta
- Family: †Megazostrodontidae
- Genus: †Megazostrodon; Crompton & Jenkins, 1968

Type species
- †Megazostrodon rudnerae Crompton & Jenkins, 1968

Other species
- †M. chenali Debuysschere et al., 2015

= Megazostrodon =

Megazostrodon Temporal range: Rhaetian–Hettangian

Extinct genus of mammaliaforms

Megazostrodon is an extinct genus of basal mammaliaforms belonging to the order Morganucodonta. It is approximately 200 million years old. Two species are known: M. rudnerae from the Early Jurassic of Lesotho and South Africa, and M. chenali from the Late Triassic of France.

== Discovery ==
The type species M. rudnerae was first discovered in 1966 in the Elliot Formation of Lesotho, southern Africa, by palaeontologist and archaeologist Ione Rudner. It was first described by A. W. Crompton and F. A. Jenkins Jr. in 1968. The generic name Megazostrodon means, literally, 'large girdle tooth' (from the Greek mega -large, zostros -girdle and don -tooth—referring to the large external cingula of the upper molars). The specific name honours Rudner for her discovery.

A second species, M. chenali, was named in 2015 based on remains found in Saint-Nicolas-de-Port, France. It is named after the French palaeontologist Emmanuel Chenal.

== Characteristics ==
Megazostrodon was a small, shrew-like animal between 10 and 12 centimetres (3.9 and 4.7 in) long which probably ate insects and small reptiles. It is thought to have been nocturnal as it had a larger brain than earlier cynodonts and the enlarged areas of its brain were found to be those that process sounds and smells. This was probably in order to avoid being in competition with the reptiles or becoming prey to the dinosaurs.

Although considered a close relative of mammals, it did have some non-mammalian characteristics inherited from its predecessors: the first two vertebrae (atlas and axis) were still unfused as in earlier cynodonts, and it only had three sacral vertebrae instead of the usual mammalian five. An interclavicle is also present, which is still present in monotremes but lost in the line leading to therian mammals.

== Evolution ==
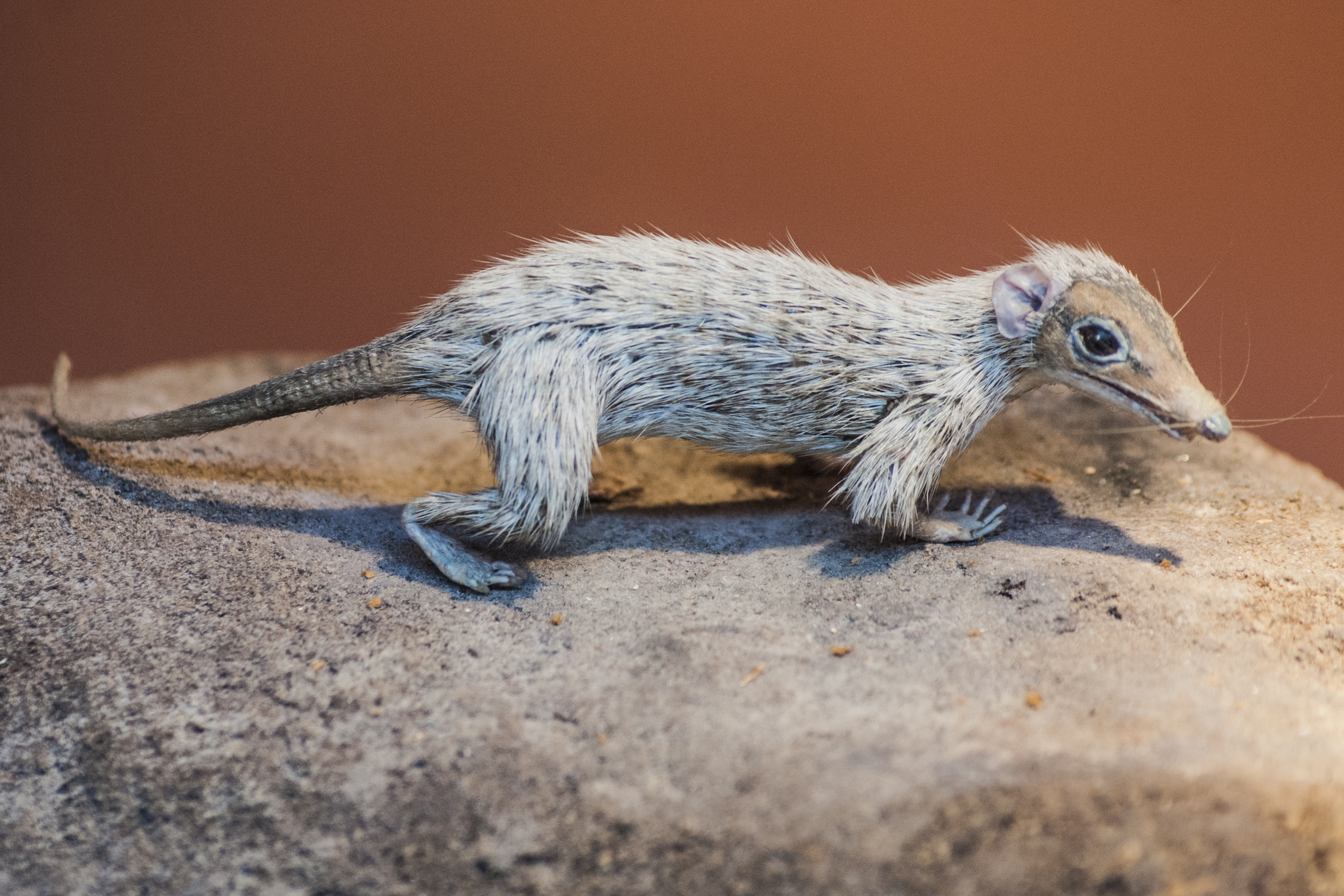
Megazostrodon model, Natural History Museum, London

Megazostrodon is the best-known genus of the family Megazostrodontidae, part of the larger group Morganucodonta. The other members of this family that are currently known are Indozostrodon, Dinnetherium, Wareolestes and Brachyzostrodon. The megazostrodontids used to be classified as members of a group of mammals called the triconodonts, which are thought to have evolved from a specific group of cynodonts during the late Triassic and early Jurassic periods. However, recent classifications consider the megazostrodontids to be mammaliaforms outside of the stricter grouping of Mammalia proper, while the triconodonts remain within the mammalian crown group.

These early mammaliaforms possessed many traits which made them well suited for an active lifestyle. They had a heterodont dentition consisting of four types of teeth: incisors, canines, premolars and molars, as opposed to the uniform (homodont) teeth of most reptiles. This enabled them to chew and therefore process their food more thoroughly than their reptilian cousins. There is evidence that the movement of the mandible allowed a shearing action to chew food. Their skeletons changed so that their limbs were more mobile, being less laterally splayed, and allowing faster forward motion. They had a short ribcage and large lungs, which allowed efficient respiration. Their lower jaw comprised a single bone—the dentary (as opposed to the multiple bones in the jaws of their ancestors, or seven different bones found in reptilian lower jaws). The other bones which once made up the jaw had reduced, and in later mammals would become incorporated into the middle ear, enhancing their hearing.

Probably the most important change in the evolution of the first mammals was that their ancestors, the cynodonts, had become endothermic. This meant that they generated their own body heat, relying on the food they ate to help sustain their body temperature rather than depending on their surrounding environment. This permitted higher, more sustained activity levels during the day than reptiles (reptiles must frequently perform temperature regulation activities such as sun basking and seeking shade). It was probably the key to becoming nocturnal—a major advantage in a world where most predators were active during the day.

Phylogeny

- Mammaliaformes
  - Adelobasileus
  - - Sinoconodon
    - - - Morganucodon
        - Megazostrodon
      - - Haramiyida
        - - - Haldanodon
            - Castorocauda
          - - Hadrocodium
            - Mammalia

== Palaeobiology ==
=== Diet ===
The molars of Megazostrodon were well suited for piercing and shear-cutting.

=== Reproduction ===
Like placentals and possibly Erythrotherium, Megazostrodon is unique among mammaliaforms in lacking epipubic bones. It is likely that Megazostrodon, like the modern monotremes, laid eggs.

== See also ==
- Evolution of mammals
- Probainognathus
