= Grenville Llewellyn Lucas =

British botanist and conservationist (1935–2022)

Grenville 'Gren' Llewellyn Lucas OBE FLS FRGS (20 December 1935 – 12 December 2022) was a British botanist, conservationist, and Keeper of the Herbarium and Library at Kew Gardens.

== Biography ==
Grenville Llewellyn Lucas was born in Cardiff on 20 December 1935. He had an early interest in natural history stimulated by the National Museum of Wales but his first job was working for the Distillers Company on the development and use of plastics and resins. After reading The Geography of the Flowering Plants by Ronald Good his interest took him to the University of Hull to study botany under Professor Good, where he received a degree in Botany.

Gren worked at Kew as a research student for the Colonial Office before taking up a post as Scientific Officer in the East African Herbarium in Nairobi. While in Nairobi he became interested in conservation work. In 1962 he returned to Kew to work on the Flora of Tropical East Africa. He and his wife were both supporters of the Surrey Naturalists' Trust. In 1974 he created the Kew Conservation Unit, which included work on CITES for the UK Government and setting up of the I.U.C.N. Threatened Plant Committee Secretariat that became integrated into the World Conservation Monitoring Centre. The International Plant Red Data Book published in 1979 co-edited with Hugh Synge was one of the products of this work.

He was a Trustee (1979–1990) of WWF (U.K.) and Council Member (1978–1990) of I.U.C.N. He served as Chairman of the Species Survival Commission of the I.U.C.N. for eight years. He was treasurer of the Linnean Society for 20 years. In 1998 he was appointed to the Council of English Nature.

He was promoted to Senior Principal Scientific Officer and in 1989 appointed the Keeper of the Herbarium and Library at Kew and Deputy Director; he retired in 1995. After retirement he remained at Kew for a year as head of the Information Services Department.

Gren met his wife Shirley while at University and they were married while in Nairobi.

Gren Lucas died on 12 December 2022.

== Honours ==
He was awarded an O.B.E. for services to Conservation in the 1980 Birthday Honours. In 1986 he received the award of Officer of the Order of the Golden Ark from Prince Bernhard. In 1987 he received the Bruno H. Schubert Prize, awarded by the Frankfurt-based Bruno H. Schubert Foundation to individuals for their exceptional commitment to preserving the biological diversity of our planet. In 1989 he was made Visiting Professor in the Department of Botany at Reading University. He was also awarded a medal in 1990 by the South African Association of Botanists (S.A.A.B.) for his contribution to African botany. In 1991 he was awarded the Sir Peter Scott Merit Award Medal by the Species Survival Commission in Australia for his work on "the survival of species of fauna and flora throughout the world." In 1997 he was awarded the Royal Geographical Society Busk Medal. He was awarded the Linnean Gold Medal in 2007.

== Selected publications ==
- Conservation of Threatened Plants. (1976). J B Simmons; R I Beyer; P E Brandham; G Ll Lucas; V T H Parry. Boston, MA : Springer US
- List of rare, threatened & endemic plants for the countries of Europe. (1976). Lucas, Gren; Walters, S.M. Kew : Royal Botanic Gardens
- The IUCN Threatened Plants Committee and Its Work Throughout the World. (1977). Lucas, Grenville Ll., and A. H. M. Synge. Environmental Conservation, vol. 4(3):179–187. JSTOR 44516713
- The IUCN Plant Red Data Book. (1978). Editors: Gren Lucas, Hugh Synge. IUCN. ISBN 9782880322021
