= Klettgau Formation =

Geological formation in Switzerland

- Stratigraphic range: Carnian-Rhaetian; ~235–202 Ma
- Type: Geological formation
- Unit of: Keuper
- Sub-units: Ergolz, Gansingen, Berlingen, Seebi, Gruhalde & Belchen Members
- Underlies: Staffelegg Formation
- Overlies: Bänkerjoch Formation
- Thickness: 30–60 m (98–197 ft) locally up to 75 m (246 ft)

Lithology
- Primary: Mudstone, marl
- Other: Dolomite, sandstone

Location
- Coordinates: 47.7°N 8.5°E
- Approximate paleocoordinates: 35.2°N 10.7°E
- Region: Aargau, Schaffhausen
- Country: Switzerland

Type section
- Named for: Klettgau
- Named by: Jordan et al.
- Location: Seebi quarry
- Year defined: 2016
- Klettgau Formation (Switzerland)

The Klettgau Formation is a geological formation in Switzerland. It is Late Triassic in age, covering most of the mid to late Norian, the Carnian, and into the Rhaetian, spanning a period of 26-30 million years.

== Description ==
The primary depositional environment was that of a playa with marine and fluvial intercalations. The lithology is quite variable consisting primarily of fine grained rocks typically claystones and dolocretes, often with sandstone or carbonatic fluvial channel fills.

== Fossil content ==
Dinosaur fossils are known from the formation, including those of Plateosaurus, Notatesseraeraptor frickensis and Schleitheimia

The following other fossils were found in the formation:

Prozostrodontia

- Hallautherium schalchi
- Helvetiodon schutzi
- ?Thomasia sp.
- cf. Thomasia sp.
- Thomasia antiqua
- T. moorei
- Tricuspes cf. tuebingensis
- ?Haramiyidae indet.
- Morganucodon peyeri
- Morganucodon sp.

Reptiles

- Deltadectes elvetica
- Termatosaurus albertii
- Schleitheimia schutzi
- Proganochelys quenstedtii
- Paleollanosaurus sp.
- ?Variodens sp.
- cf. Diphydontosaurus sp.
- cf. Eudimorphodon sp.
- Archosauriformes indet.
- Nothosauridae indet.
- Pterosauria indet.
- Sphenodontia indet.
- Theropoda indet.

Amphibians

- Labyrinthodontia indet.

Fish

- Ceratodus parvus
- Sargodon tomicus
- Dapedium sp.
- Hybodus sp.
- Osteichthyes indet.

Invertebrates

- Crinoidea indet.
- Echinodermata indet.
- Mollusca indet.
