= Doris Kermack =

British paleontologist (1923–2003)

Doris Mary Kermack
- Born: Doris Mary Carr; 1923
- Died: 2003 (aged 79-80)
- Education: University College London
- Occupation: paleontologist
- Scientific career
- Fields: Vertebrate paleontology
- Workplaces: Imperial College London

Doris Mary Kermack FLS (née Carr; 1923 – 2003) was a British paleontologist and marine zoologist at Imperial College London. She completed her PhD thesis The Anatomy and Physiology of the Gut of Arenicola marina L. at University College London in 1953. In 1988 she was awarded the Linnean Gold Medal for outstanding service to the society. She had two sons with her husband and fellow paleontologist Kenneth Kermack.

The species name Bridetherium dorisae is named in her honour.

Together with her husband and Frances Mussett, she was the first to formally describe the early mammal-like "symmetrodont" Kuehneotherium praecursoris.
