= Stylidens =

Stylidens Temporal range: Bathonian, ~167.7–166.1 Ma

Scientific classification
- Domain: Eukaryota
- Kingdom: Animalia
- Phylum: Chordata
- Clade: Synapsida
- Clade: Therapsida
- Clade: Cynodontia
- Clade: Mammaliaformes
- Order: †Morganucodonta (?)
- Genus: †Stylidens; Butler & Sigogneau-Russell, 2016

Type species
- †Stylidens hookeri Butler & Sigogneau-Russell, 2016

Extinct genus of mammaliaforms

Stylidens is an extinct genus of mammaliaforms, possibly belonging to Morganucodonta, that lived in what is now England during the Middle Jurassic. Its type species is Stylidens hookeri, which was named in 2016 by Percy M. Butler and Denise Sigogneau-Russell from an isolated lower molar found at the Forest Marble Formation. A second molar referable to the genus is also known, which may represent a separate species.

== Etymology ==
The generic epithet Stylidens is derived from the Latin words stylus, alluding to the pointed cusps of its molars, and dens, meaning "tooth". The specific name hookeri honours the British researcher Jerry Hooker.
