= Tikiodon =

Tikiodon Temporal range: Late Triassic

Scientific classification
- Domain: Eukaryota
- Kingdom: Animalia
- Phylum: Chordata
- Clade: Synapsida
- Clade: Therapsida
- Clade: Cynodontia
- Clade: Mammaliamorpha
- Genus: †Tikiodon; Bhat et al., 2020
- Species: †T. cromptoni

Binomial name
- †Tikiodon cromptoni Bhat et al., 2020

Extinct genus of mammaliamorphs

Tikiodon is an extinct genus of mammaliamorphs that lived in what is now India during the Late Triassic. Its type and only species is Tikiodon cromptoni, which is known from a single lower postcanine tooth discovered at the Tiki Formation of Madhya Pradesh.

== Etymology ==
The generic name Tikiodon comes from the Tiki Formation, itself named after the nearby village of Tiki, and the Greek word odon, meaning "tooth". The specific epithet cromptoni is a reference to South African palaeontologist Alfred W. Crompton.
