= Lepagia =

Lepagia Temporal range: Upper Triassic

Scientific classification
- Domain: Eukaryota
- Kingdom: Animalia
- Phylum: Chordata
- Clade: Synapsida
- Clade: Therapsida
- Clade: Cynodontia
- Family: incertae sedis
- Genus: †Lepagia; Hahn, Wild & Wouters, 1987
- Species: †L. gaumensis

Binomial name
- †Lepagia gaumensis Hahn, Wild & Wouters, 1987

Extinct genus of cynodonts

Lepagia is an extinct genus of poorly known carnivorous cynodonts, which lived during the Upper Triassic in Europe. Partly due to the paucity of remains (it is only known from teeth) the precise affinities of this genus are unclear. It seems reasonably closely related to Probainognathus, a somewhat earlier inhabitant of South America. The genus Lepagia ("for Lepage") was named by Hahn, Wild and Wouters in 1987 based on a single species.

Fossil remains of the species Lepagia gaumensis have been found in the Norian (late) - Rhaetian (early) (Upper Triassic)-age strata from Habay-la-Vielle, Hallau, Saint-Nicolas-de-Port in Belgium, Switzerland and France.

The holotype is at the Institut royal des Sciences naturelles de Belgique (Royal Institute of Natural Sciences of Belgium) in Brussels. These teeth are 2 – 3 mm in length. The postcanines have long and narrow crowns with three to five cusps, the central one of which is dominant and points straight upwards. The root is vaguely rectangular, with the lower portion tapering. There are no distinctive wear facets, but the separation of crown and root are clear. Sometimes the crown is larger and sometimes the root.

Godefroit and Battail cite similarities and differences with and to both Chiniquodontidae and Dromatheriidae and leave the systematical placement open.
