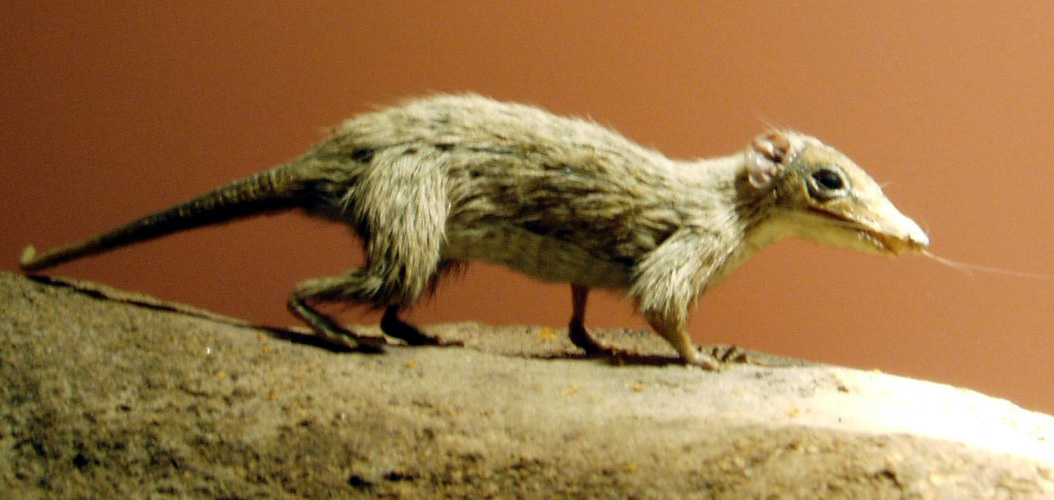
- Life restoration of a Megazostrodon, Natural History Museum, London

Scientific classification
- Kingdom: Animalia
- Phylum: Chordata
- Clade: Synapsida
- Clade: Therapsida
- Clade: Cynodontia
- Clade: Mammaliaformes
- Order: †Morganucodonta; Kermack, Mussett & Rigney, 1973

Subgroups
- †Bridetherium; †Cherwellia?; †Cifellilestes; †Hallautherium; †Paceyodon; †Purbeckodon?; †Rosierodon; †Storchodon; †Stylidens?; †Morganucodontidae Kuhne, 1958; †Eozostrodon; †Erythrotherium; †Gondwanadon?; †Helvetiodon; †Indotherium?; †Morganucodon; †Paikasigudodon; †Megazostrodontidae Gow, 1986; †Brachyzostrodon; †Dinnetherium; †Indozostrodon?; †Megazostrodon; †Wareolestes

= Morganucodonta =

Morganucodonta Temporal range: Late Triassic – Lower Cretaceous 210–140 Ma

Extinct order of mammaliaforms

Morganucodonta ("Glamorgan teeth") is an extinct order of basal Mammaliaformes, a group including crown-group mammals (Mammalia) and their close relatives. Their remains have been found in Southern Africa, Western Europe, North America, India and China. The morganucodontans were probably insectivorous and nocturnal, though like eutriconodonts some species attained large sizes and were carnivorous. Nocturnality is believed to have evolved in the earliest mammals in the Triassic (called the nocturnal bottleneck) as a specialisation that allowed them to exploit a safer, night-time niche, while most larger predators were likely to have been active during the day (though some dinosaurs, for example, were nocturnal as well).

== Anatomy and biology ==
Skull of Morganucodon

Morganucodontans had a double jaw articulation made up of the dentary-squamosal joint as well as a quadrate-articular one. This implies that they also retained one of their postdentary bones: the articular. There is a trough at the back of the jaw on the inside (lingual) where the postdentary bones sat. The double jaw articulation and retention of the postdentary bones are characteristic of many of the earliest Mammaliaformes, but are absent today in mammals: All crown-group mammals have a lower jaw that is composed of a single bone, and the articular has been incorporated into the middle ear, having become the malleus (while the quadrate has become the incus).

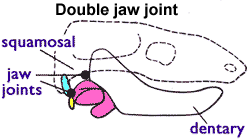
Diagram showing characteristic double jaw joint

Unlike more basal therapsids such as Sinoconodon, morganucodontan teeth were diphyodont (meaning that they replaced their teeth once, having a 'milk' set and 'adult' set as seen in today's mammals including humans and not polyphyodont (meaning that the teeth are constantly replaced, and the animal and its teeth get larger throughout its lifetime, as in reptiles). Evidence of lactation is present in Wareolestes, via tooth replacement patterns.

Morganucodontans also had specialised teeth—incisors, canines, molars and premolars—for food processing, rather than having similarly shaped teeth along the tooth row as seen in their predecessors. Morganucodontans are thought to have been insectivorous and carnivorous, their teeth adapted for shearing. Niche partitioning is known among various morganucodontan species, different types specialised for different prey. Paceyodon davidi was the largest species of morganucodontans. It is known by a right lower molariform 3.3 mm (0.13 in) in length, which is bigger than molariforms of all other morganucodontans.

The teeth of some morganucodonts are structured in such a way that occlusion happens by the lower cusp "a" fitting anteriorly to upper cusp "A", between "A" and "B". This occlusion pattern is by no means universal among morganucodontans, however; Dinnetherium, for example, has an occlusion mechanism closer to that of the eutriconodonts, in which molars basically alternate. Wear facets are present.

The septomaxilla, a primitive feature also found in Sinoconodon, is found in morganucodontans, as well as a fully ossified orbitosphenoid. The anterior lamina is enlarged. The cranial moiety of the squamosal is a narrow bone that is superficially placed to the petrosal and parietal. Unlike its predecessors, the morganucodontans have a larger cerebral capacity and a longer cochlea.

The atlas elements are unfused; there is a suture between the dens and axis. The cervical ribs are not fused to the centra. The coracoid and procoracoid, which are absent in therians, are present. The head of the humerus is spherical as in mammals, but the spiral ulnar condyle is cynodont-like. In the pelvic girdle, the pubis, ilium and ischium are unfused. At least Megazostrodon and Erythrotherium are unique among basal mammaliaforms for lacking epipubic bones, suggesting that they did not have the same reproductive constraints.

Morganucodon at least appears to have had a long lifespan and a lower metabolism than modern mammals.

== Classification ==
Because morganucodontans possessed the mammalian dentary-squamosal jaw joint, systematists like G. G. Simpson (1959) considered the morganucodontans to be mammals. Some palaeontologists continue to use this classification. Others use crown-group terminology, which limits Mammalia to the descendants of the closest common ancestor of living mammals. By this definition, more basal orders like morganucodontans are not in Mammalia, but are mammaliaformes. This is the most commonly accepted classification system.

== See also ==
- Adelobasileus
- Hadrocodium
- Sinoconodon
- Evolution of mammals
- Evolution of mammalian auditory ossicles

== Bibliography ==
- Rich, PV; Fenton, MA; Fenton, CL; THV, Rich (1996). The Fossil Book: A Record of Prehistoric Life. Courier Corporation. p. 519. ISBN 9780486293714.
- Palmer, D, ed. (2006). The Illustrated Encyclopedia of the Prehistoric World. Book Sales. p. 342. ISBN 9780785820864.
- Kielan-Jaworowska, Z; Luo, ZX; Cifelli, RL (2004). Mammals from the Age of Dinosaurs. Columbia University Press. pp. 168–183. ISBN 9780231119184.
