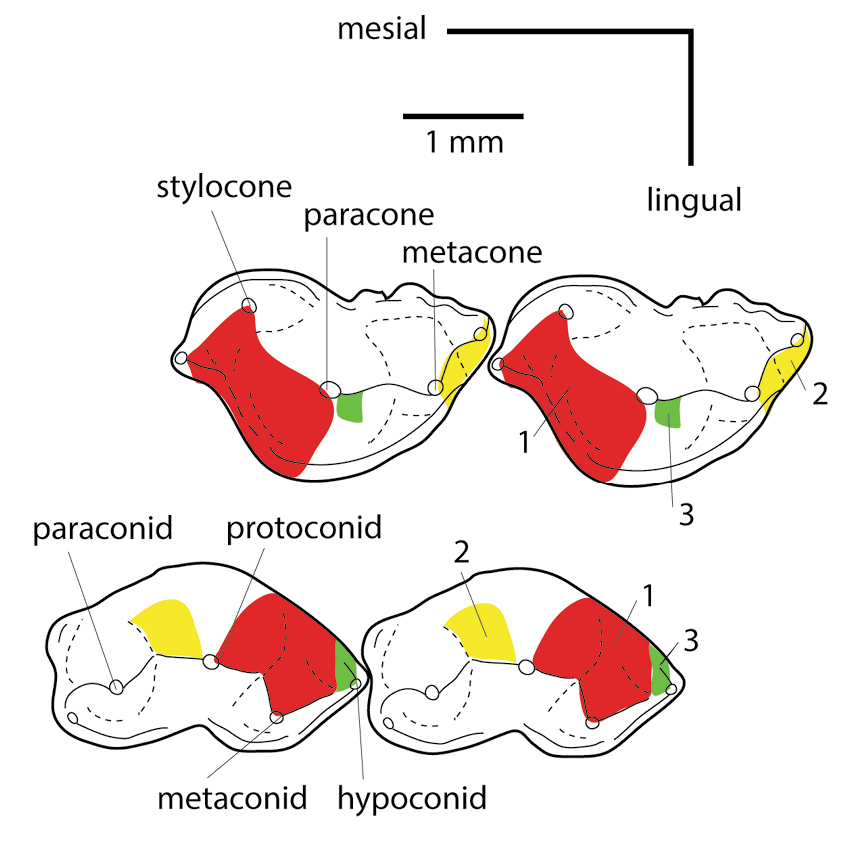
- Upper and lower molars of Kuehneotherium

Scientific classification
- Kingdom: Animalia
- Phylum: Chordata
- Clade: Synapsida
- Clade: Therapsida
- Clade: Cynodontia
- Clade: Mammaliaformes
- Family: †Kuehneotheriidae
- Genus: †Kuehneotherium; D.M. Kermack et al., 1968

Type species
- †Kuehneotherium praecursoris D.M. Kermack et al., 1968

Other species
- †K. stanislavi Debuysschere, 2017

= Kuehneotherium =

Kuehneotherium Temporal range: Rhaetian-Hettangian ~206–199 Ma

Extinct genus of mammaliaforms

Kuehneotherium is an early mammaliaform genus, previously considered a holothere, that lived during the Late Triassic-Early Jurassic Epochs and is characterized by reversed-triangle pattern of molar cusps. Although many fossils have been found, the fossils are limited to teeth, dental fragments, and mandible fragments. The genus includes Kuehneotherium praecursoris and all related species. It was first named and described by Doris M. Kermack, K. A. Kermack, and Frances Mussett in November 1967. The family Kuehneotheriidae and the genus Kuehneotherium were created to house the single species Kuehneotherium praecursoris. Modeling based upon a comparison of the Kuehneotherium jaw with other mammaliaforms indicates it was about the size of a modern-day shrew between 4 and 5.5 g at adulthood.

Kuehneotherium is thought to be an insectivore that could consume only soft-bodied insects such as moths. Its teeth were shaped for vertical shearing and could not crush harder prey. It lived alongside another early mammaliaform, Morganucodon, which had teeth that could crush harder insects such as beetles. This distinction in diet shows that early mammaliaforms adapted to have separate feeding niches so they would not compete for food.

== Species ==
Remains of Kuehneotherium praecursoris have been found in the Pontalun Quarry in a single fissure pocket in South Wales. The deposit found in limestone is from the Late Triassic. (Whiteside and Marshall 2008) Additional Kuehneotherium fossils have been found in rock formations of the Early Jurassic of Britain (Somerset), and the Late Triassic of France (Saint-Nicolas-de-Porte), Luxembourg, and Greenland; the Kuehneotherium specimens for Saint-Nicolas-de-Porte have been named K. stanislavi.

== Paleoenvironment ==
During the Late Triassic epoch the supercontinent Pangaea was intact, allowing easy interchange and migration of animals across the connected continents. This explains the wide distribution of Kuehneotherium fossils found throughout Greenland and Europe. When the continents began to rift apart during the Jurassic, shallow seas covered the British Isles, where Kuehneotherium was first found. Its remains were swept into limestone caves and fissures formed by the shallow seas and were preserved as fossils in clastic sediment.

The climate Kuehneotherium lived in was hot and dry during this part of the early Mesozoic. Conifer plants thrived and spread throughout Pangaea. As the continents rifted apart during the Early Jurassic the climate was more humid. Ferns, horsetails, cycads, and mosses were common in both the Triassic and Jurassic, however they were more prevalent in the more humid Jurassic period.

== Phylogeny ==
The phylogenetic position for Kuehneotherium has been widely debated. Kuehneotherium was once classified as a therian mammal (the common ancestor of marsupials, placentals, and their descendants). However, additional fossils of basal mammals have been found that predate the Kuehneotherium on the geological timescale and the relationships of early mammals were re-evaluated. Kuehneotherium is now placed in the more basal clade called Holotheria. Kuehneotherium preacursoris is the earliest mammal categorized as holotherian. Holotheria includes species in which the main and accessory molar cusps are arranged in a triangle. Kuehneotherium's place in Holotheria is considered unstable, as it is difficult to determine a species characteristics based upon only mandible and dental fragments.

Phylogeny (Zofia Kielan-Jaworowska et al., 2002)

- Mammaliaformes
  - Sinoconodon
  - - - Morganucodon
      - - Megazostrodon
        - Dinnetherium
    - - Haldanodon
      - - Hadrocodium
        - - Kuehneotherium
          - Mammalia

== Significance to the evolution of mammalian dentition ==
Study of the initial development of molar cusp triangulation in Kuehneotherium preacursoris was key in the early understanding of the transition between triconodont and crown therian molars.

Kuehneotherium dentition shows a significant link between mammaliaform triconodont shaped teeth used for in a puncture-crushing pattern, to modern crown therian molars that chew vertically and chew horizontally. Therian mammals such as marsupials and placentals shared a common ancestor that was characterized by an upper molar with three main cusps arranged in a triangle that fits into the lower molar that has a reversed triangle and basin-like heel. Later discovery of the earlier more basal mammal Woutersia, provided additional information on this dental transition. Kuehneotherium, like other mammals had two sets of teeth during its life. It is speculated that they may have had up to six lower molars with the last molar being added to the back later in life. The evidence for this is that the postcanine tooth row shifts backwards as the animal grew. They had 5-6 premolars; the first four premolars are single rooted. Anterior premolars would have been shed in late adulthood and not replaced. The lower jaw is a more basal morphology with a prominent postdentary groove where more developed postdentary bones would attach. The enamel microstructures of Kuehneotherium teeth were synapsid columnar enamel characterized by a pattern of columnar, prism-less structures.

== Metabolism ==
Alongside Morganucodon, Kuehneotherium appears to have had a lower metabolism than modern mammals, having a long lifespan.

== See also ==
- Evolution of mammals
