= Fluctuodon =

Fluctuodon Temporal range: Rhaetian

Scientific classification
- Domain: Eukaryota
- Kingdom: Animalia
- Phylum: Chordata
- Clade: Synapsida
- Clade: Therapsida
- Clade: Cynodontia
- Clade: Mammaliaformes
- Family: †Kuehneotheriidae
- Genus: †Fluctuodon; Debuysschere, 2017
- Species: †F. necmergor

Binomial name
- †Fluctuodon necmergor Debuysschere, 2017

Extinct genus of mammaliaforms

Fluctuodon is an extinct genus of kuehneotheriid mammaliaforms from the Late Triassic of France. Its type and only known species is Fluctuodon necmergor. Fluctuodon is known solely from molar teeth, which are distinguished from those of its close relative Kuehneotherium by their less acutely angled cusps.
