= Hallautherium =

Hallautherium Temporal range: Norian–Rhaetian

Scientific classification
- Domain: Eukaryota
- Kingdom: Animalia
- Phylum: Chordata
- Clade: Synapsida
- Clade: Therapsida
- Clade: Cynodontia
- Clade: Mammaliaformes
- Order: †Morganucodonta
- Genus: †Hallautherium; Clemens, 1980
- Species: †H. schalchi

Binomial name
- †Hallautherium schalchi Clemens, 1980

Extinct genus of mammaliaforms

Hallautherium is an extinct genus of morganucodont mammaliaforms from the Late Triassic of Europe. The type species H. schalchi is known from the Klettgau Formation of Switzerland. In addition, a molariform tooth referable to the genus has been found in Poland.
