= Rewaconodon =

Rewaconodon Temporal range: 237–208.5 Ma

Scientific classification
- Kingdom: Animalia
- Phylum: Chordata
- Clade: Synapsida
- Clade: Therapsida
- Clade: Cynodontia
- Family: †Dromatheriidae
- Genus: †Rewaconodon; Datta et al., 2004

Type species
- †Rewaconodon tikiensis Datta et al., 2004

Other species
- †R. indicus Bhat et al., 2020

Extinct genus of cynodonts

Rewaconodon is an extinct genus of dromatheriid cynodonts which existed in India during the upper Triassic period. It is known from two species: R. tikiensis and R. indicus, both of which were found in the Tiki Formation. The forms similar to R. tikiensis are known from United States.
