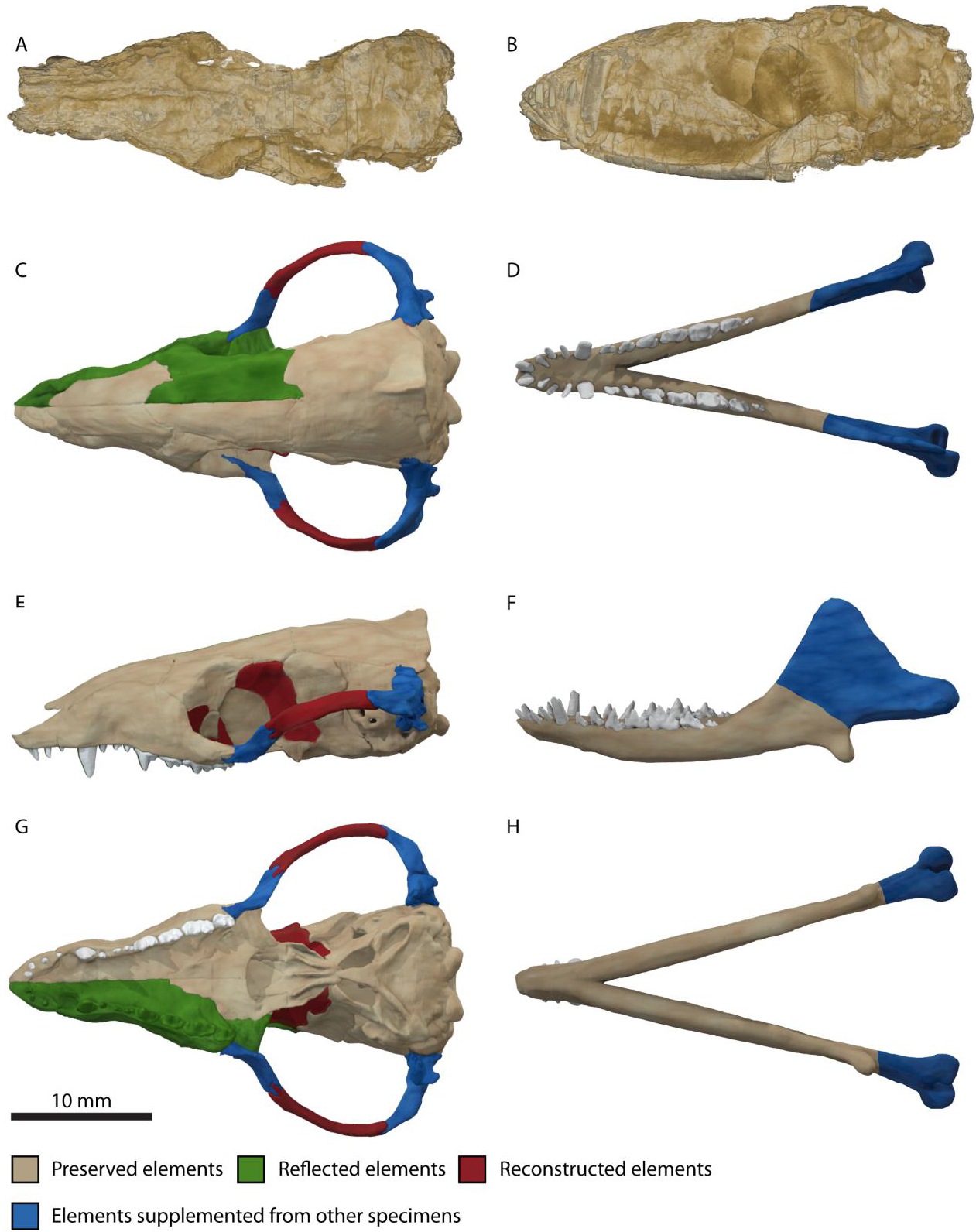
- Scan and reconstruction of the M. oehleri holotype skull

Scientific classification
- Kingdom: Animalia
- Phylum: Chordata
- Clade: Synapsida
- Clade: Therapsida
- Clade: Cynodontia
- Clade: Mammaliaformes
- Order: †Morganucodonta
- Family: †Morganucodontidae
- Genus: †Morganucodon; Kühne, 1949

Type species
- †Morganucodon watsoni Kühne, 1949

Species
- †M. watsoni (Kühne, 1949); †M. oehleri (Rigney, 1963); †M. heikuopengensis (Young, 1978); †M. peyeri (Clemens, 1980); †M. tardus (Butler and Sigogneau-Russell, 2016)

= Morganucodon =

Morganucodon Temporal range: Late Triassic-Middle Jurassic Rhaetian–Bathonian

Early mammaliaform genus of the Triassic and Jurassic periods

Morganucodon ("Glamorgan tooth") is an early mammaliaform genus that lived from the Late Triassic to the Middle Jurassic. It first appeared about 205 million years ago. Unlike many other early mammaliaforms, Morganucodon is well represented by abundant and well-preserved (though in the vast majority of cases disarticulated) material. Most of this comes from Glamorgan in Wales (Morganucodon watsoni), but fossils have also been found in Yunnan Province in China (Morganucodon oehleri) and various parts of Europe and North America. Some closely related animals (Megazostrodon) are known from exquisite fossils from South Africa.

The name comes from a Latinization of Morganuc, the name for South Glamorgan in the Domesday Book, the county of Wales where it was discovered by Walter Georg Kühne, giving the meaning "Glamorgan tooth".

== History of discovery ==
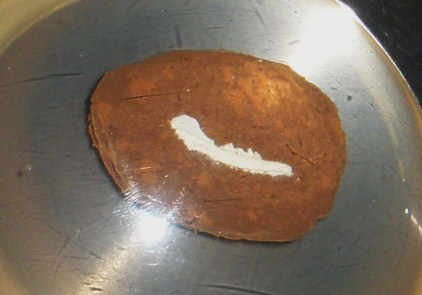
Lower jaw of M. watsoni, Natural History Museum, London

In the summer of 1947, fieldwork was done at Duchy Quarry in Glamorgan in southern Wales. Grey conglomerate that formed fissure fill deposits within karstic voids in Carboniferous limestone was extracted. In 1949, Walter Georg Kühne noted the lower cheek tooth of a primitive mammal while examining samples of the rock. He named it Morganucodon watsoni, with the genus name being derived from Morganuc, which Kühne stated was the name of South Glamorgan in the Domesday Book, with the species name being in honour of D. M. S. Watson. Additional remains of M. watsoni were described by Kühne in 1958. Also in 1958, Kenneth Kermack and Frances Mussett described additional remains from Pant Quarry, about a mile from Duchy Quarry, that had been collected in 1956. In August 1948, an expedition to Lufeng in Yunnan, China yielded a 1-inch-long (2.5 cm) skull. It was shortly sent to Beijing (then Peking) and then eventually sent out of China, and deposited with Kenneth Kermack at University College London in 1960. The specimen was preliminarily described in 1963 by Harold W. Rigney, who noted the similarity to Morganucodon from Britain, and considered it cogeneric, naming the new species Morganucodon oehleri in honor of the reverend Edgar T. Oehler, who had originally collected the specimen. In 1978 C. C. Young described Eozostrodon heikuopengensis from the Hei Koa Peng locality near Lufeng, based on an associated skull and dentary, as well as a right maxilla and associated dentary. A revision by William A. Clemens in 1979 assigned this species to Morganucodon, based on its close similarity to the two previously named species. In 1980 Clemens named the species Morganucodon peyeri, from isolated teeth found in Late Triassic (Rhaetian) deposits near Hallau, Switzerland, with the species being named after paleontologist Bernhard Peyer. In 1981, Kermack, Mussett and Rigney published an extensive monograph on the skull of Morganucodon. In 2016 Percy Butler and Denise Sigogneau-Russell named the species Morganucodon tardus from an upper right molar (M34984) collected from the Watton Cliff locality near Eype in Dorset, England, dating to the late Bathonian stage of the Middle Jurassic. The species being named after the Latin tardus, late, in reference to it being the youngest member of the genus.

== Biology ==
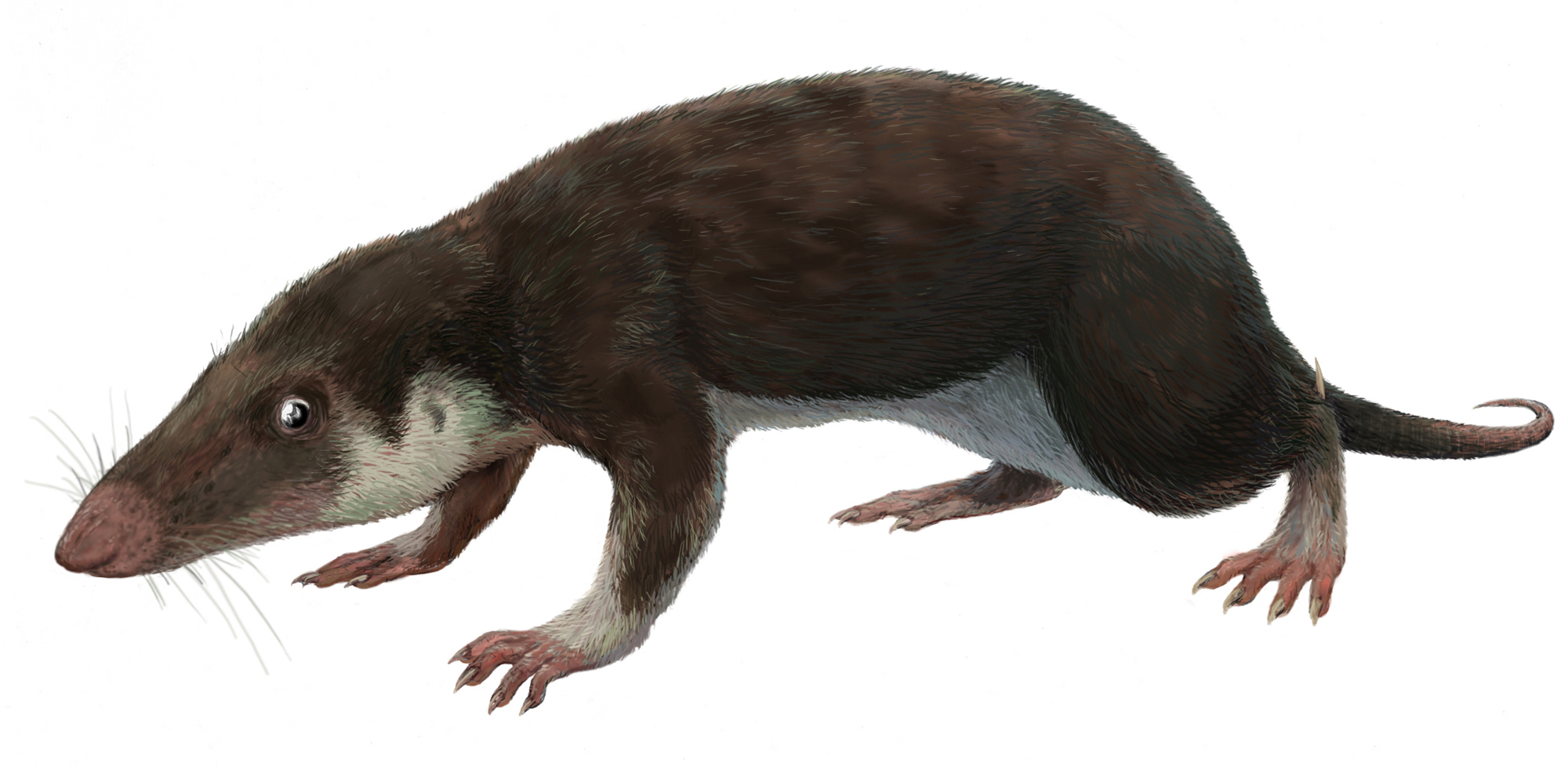
Life restoration of M. oehleri

Diagram of the skull of Morganucodon, with bones labelled

=== Size and build ===
Morganucodon was a small, plantigrade animal. The tail was moderately long. According to Kemp (2005), "the skull was 2–3 cm in length and a presacral body length of about 10 cm [4 inches]. In general appearance, it would have looked like a shrew or mouse". There is evidence that it had specialized glands used for grooming, which may indicate that, like present day mammals, it had fur.

=== Reproduction and lifespan ===
Considering both other cynodonts like Lystrosaurus and modern monotremes laid eggs, Morganucodon too was likely oviparious, laying eggs. The eggs were probably small and leathery, like those found in modern monotremes.

A 2020 study suggests that the metabolism of Morganucodon was significantly slower than that of comparably sized modern mammals, and that it had a life-span more similar to that of reptiles, with the oldest specimen having a lifespan of 14 years. Thus it likely did not possess the fully endothermic metabolism seen in current mammals.

=== Habit ===
Like present-day mammals of similar size and presumed habit, Morganucodon was likely nocturnal and spent the day in a burrow. There is no direct fossil evidence, but several lines of evidence point to a nocturnal bottleneck in the evolution of the mammal class, and almost all modern mammals of similar size to Morganucodon are still nocturnal. Likewise, burrowing was widespread both in non-mammalian cynodonts and in primitive mammals. The logics of phylogenetic bracketing would make Morganucodon nocturnal and burrowing too. Plant material from the conifer Hirmeriella was also found in the fissure fills, indicating Morganucudon lived in, or near, a forested area.

=== Diet ===
The diet appears to have been insects and other small animals, with a preference for hard prey such as beetles. Like most modern mammal insectivores, it grew fairly quickly to adult size.

The teeth grew in mammalian fashion, with deciduous teeth being replaced by permanent teeth that were retained throughout the rest of the animal's life. The combination of rapid growth in juveniles and a toothless stage at infancy strongly suggests that Morganucodon raised its young by lactation; indeed, it may have been among the first animals to do so.

The molars in the adult had a series of raised humps and edges that fit into each other, allowing for efficient chewing. However, unlike the situation in most later mammals, the upper and lower molars did not occlude properly when they first met; as they wore against each other, however, their shapes were modified by wear to produce a precise fit. The molars of Morganucodon were adapted for piercing and shear-cutting.

== Species ==
Skull and jaws of M. oehleri

Species	Author	Year	Status	Temporal range	Location	Formations
Morganucodon watsoni	Kuehne	1949		Early Jurassic (Hettangian–Sinemurian)	England, Wales	Various fissure fill deposits
Morganucodon heikuopengensis	Young	1978		Early Jurassic (Sinemurian)	Yunnan, China	Lufeng
Morganucodon oehleri	Rigney	1963		Early Jurassic (Hettangian)	Yunnan, China	Lufeng
Morganucodon peyeri	Clemens	1980		Late Triassic (Rhaetian)	Switzerland, France	Klettgau, grès infraliasiques (Saint-Nicolas-de-Port)
Morganucodon tardus	Butler and Sigogneau-Russel	2016		Middle Jurassic (Bathonian)	England	Forest Marble

== Classification ==
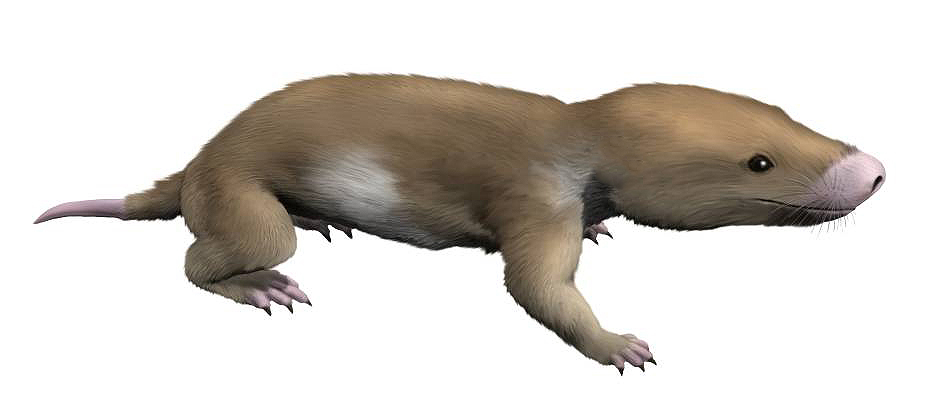
Life restoration of M. watsoni

Morganucodon is the type genus for the order Morganucodonta, a group of generally similar mammaliaforms known from the Late Triassic to Late Jurassic epochs, with one possible member (Purbeckodon) dating to the Early Cretaceous. All were small and likely insectivorous. Morganucodon is the best preserved and best understood member of Morganucodonta.

There is currently controversy about whether or not to classify Morganucodon as a mammal or as a non-mammalian mammaliaform. Some researchers limit the term "mammal" to the crown group mammals, which would not include Morganucodon and its relatives. Others, however, define "mammals", as a group, by the possession of a special, secondarily evolved jaw joint between the dentary and the squamosal bones, which has replaced the primitive one between the articular and quadrate bones in all modern mammalian groups. Under this definition, Morganucodon would be a mammal. Nevertheless, its lower jaw retains some of the bones found in its non-mammalian ancestors in a very reduced form rather than being composed solely of the dentary. Furthermore, the primitive reptile-like jaw joint between the articular and quadrate bones, which in modern mammals has moved into the middle ear and become part of the ear ossicles as malleus and incus, is still to be found in Morganucodon. Morganucodon also suckled (it may have been the earliest animal to do so), had only two sets of teeth and grew rapidly to adult size and stopped growing thereafter, all typical mammalian traits.

Phylogeny

- Mammaliaformes
  - Adelobasileus
  - - Sinoconodon
    - - - Morganucodon
        - Megazostrodon
      - - Haramiyida
        - - - Haldanodon
            - Castorocauda
          - - Hadrocodium
            - Mammalia

== See also ==
- Evolution of mammals
