= Linnean Gold Medal =

The Linnean Gold Medal is a medal awarded by the Linnean Society of London in "special circumstances" for "services to the Society". As the society's highest honour it has, to date, only been awarded three times.

== Gold Medallists ==
- Doris Kermack (1988) (palaeontologist and marine zoologist)
- David F. Cutler PPLS (1999) (botanist and plant anatomist)
- Grenville Llewellyn Lucas (2007) (Keeper of the Herbarium of the Royal Botanic Gardens at Kew)
