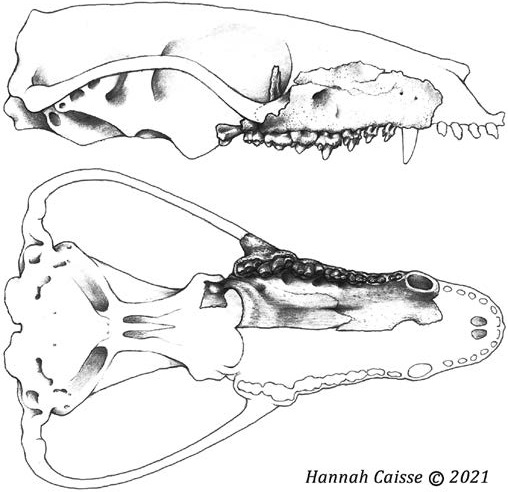

Scientific classification
- Kingdom: Animalia
- Phylum: Chordata
- Clade: Synapsida
- Clade: Therapsida
- Clade: Cynodontia
- Clade: Mammaliaformes
- Order: †Morganucodonta
- Genus: †Cifellilestes; Davis et al., 2022
- Species: †C. ciscoensis

Binomial name
- †Cifellilestes ciscoensis Davis et al., 2022

= Cifellilestes =

Cifellilestes Temporal range: Tithonian 151.5 Ma

Extinct genus of mammaliaforms

Cifellilestes is a genus of early mammaliaform from the Late Jurassic Morrison Formation of North America. The type and only species, C. ciscoensis, was named in 2022 by Brian M. Davis and colleagues, and was found in the Cisco Mammal Quarry of Utah. The generic name of the animal is in honor of Richard Cifelli, combined with the Greek word "lestes", which means thief. The specific name refers to Cisco, Utah, a ghost town close in close proximity to the location where the holotype was found. The genus is known from two specimens, OMNH 80538 & 69352. These specimens represent a right and left skull fragment respectively, both preserving partial palate, snout and postcanine dentition. It belongs to the clade Morganucodonta.
