= Deccanodon =

Deccanodon Temporal range: Late Triassic

Scientific classification
- Domain: Eukaryota
- Kingdom: Animalia
- Phylum: Chordata
- Clade: Synapsida
- Clade: Therapsida
- Clade: Cynodontia
- Family: †Dromatheriidae
- Genus: †Deccanodon; Nath and Yadagiri, 2007
- Species: †D. maleriensis

Binomial name
- †Deccanodon maleriensis Nath and Yadagiri, 2007

Extinct genus of cynodonts

Deccanodon is an extinct genus of dromatheriid cynodonts which existed in India during the Late Triassic. The type species is D. maleriensis, named in 2007. Deccanodon was one of the first Triassic cynodonts named from India and was found in the Maleri Formation in Adilabad district.
