= Walter Georg Kühne =

German paleontologist

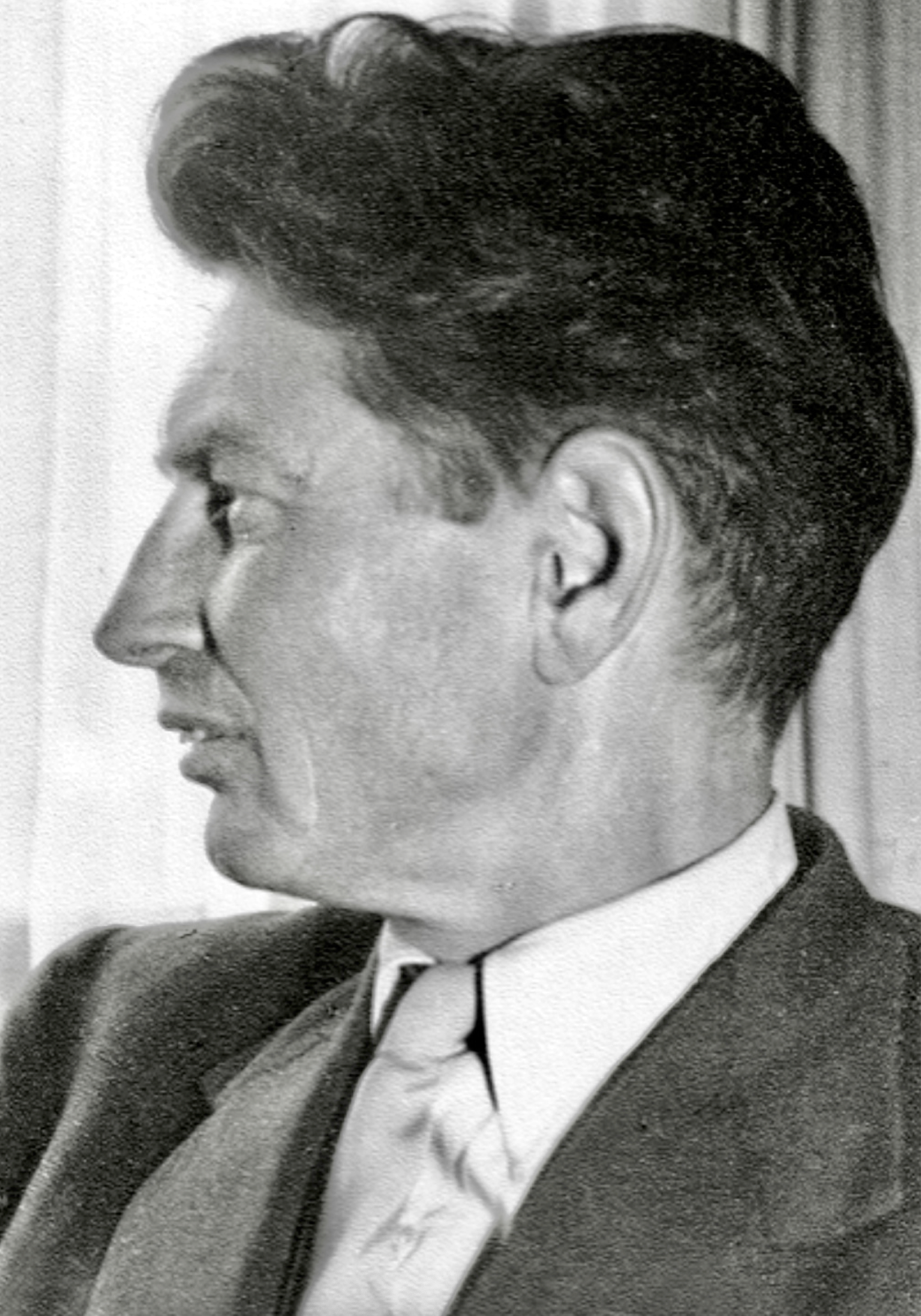
Walter Georg Kühne, 1950s

Walter Georg Kühne (February 26, 1911 in Berlin – March 16, 1991 ibid.) was a German paleontologist, known as a "legendary explorer of Mesozoic mammals". He graduated in March 1930 from reform boarding school Schule am Meer on the island of Juist in Prussia. In 1958 he founded the Institute for Paleontology of the Free University of Berlin. His studies focused specifically on Mesozoic microfaunae, seeking to bring to light the history of the oldest mammals, which until the 1960s was almost unknown. Before him, findings of species of small size in the continental Mesozoic deposits had been mostly random. His efforts were concentrated more in excavations in lignite mines which he considered as preferred deposits for the remains of terrestrial vertebrates. Thanks to his efforts new species could be described that were interpreted as the most primitive mammals as Morganucodon and Kuehneotherium, as well as the proto-mammal Oligokyphus.

He was the first to discover the immense paleontological heritage of the famous Guimarota lignite mine in Portugal and to start methodological, accurate excavations in the area.

[A. W.] Crompton tells the story of a German refugee named Walter Kuhne, who at the start of World War II walked into Cambridge University with teeth from a borderline mammal. "I know where to discover early mammals," he told the British paleontologist F. R. Parrington. Parrington was impressed enough to offer him £5 (about $35 then) for every additional tooth he brought to the university.
