= Rosierodon =

Rosierodon Temporal range: Rhaetian

Scientific classification
- Domain: Eukaryota
- Kingdom: Animalia
- Phylum: Chordata
- Clade: Synapsida
- Clade: Therapsida
- Clade: Cynodontia
- Clade: Mammaliaformes
- Order: †Morganucodonta
- Genus: †Rosierodon; Debuysschere et al., 2015
- Species: †R. anceps

Binomial name
- †Rosierodon anceps Debuysschere et al., 2015

Extinct genus of mammaliaforms

Rosierodon is an extinct genus of morganucodont mammaliaforms from the Late Triassic of France. It contains a single species, Rosierodon anceps, which was named in 2015 based on several isolated lower molariforms discovered in Saint-Nicolas-de-Port.
