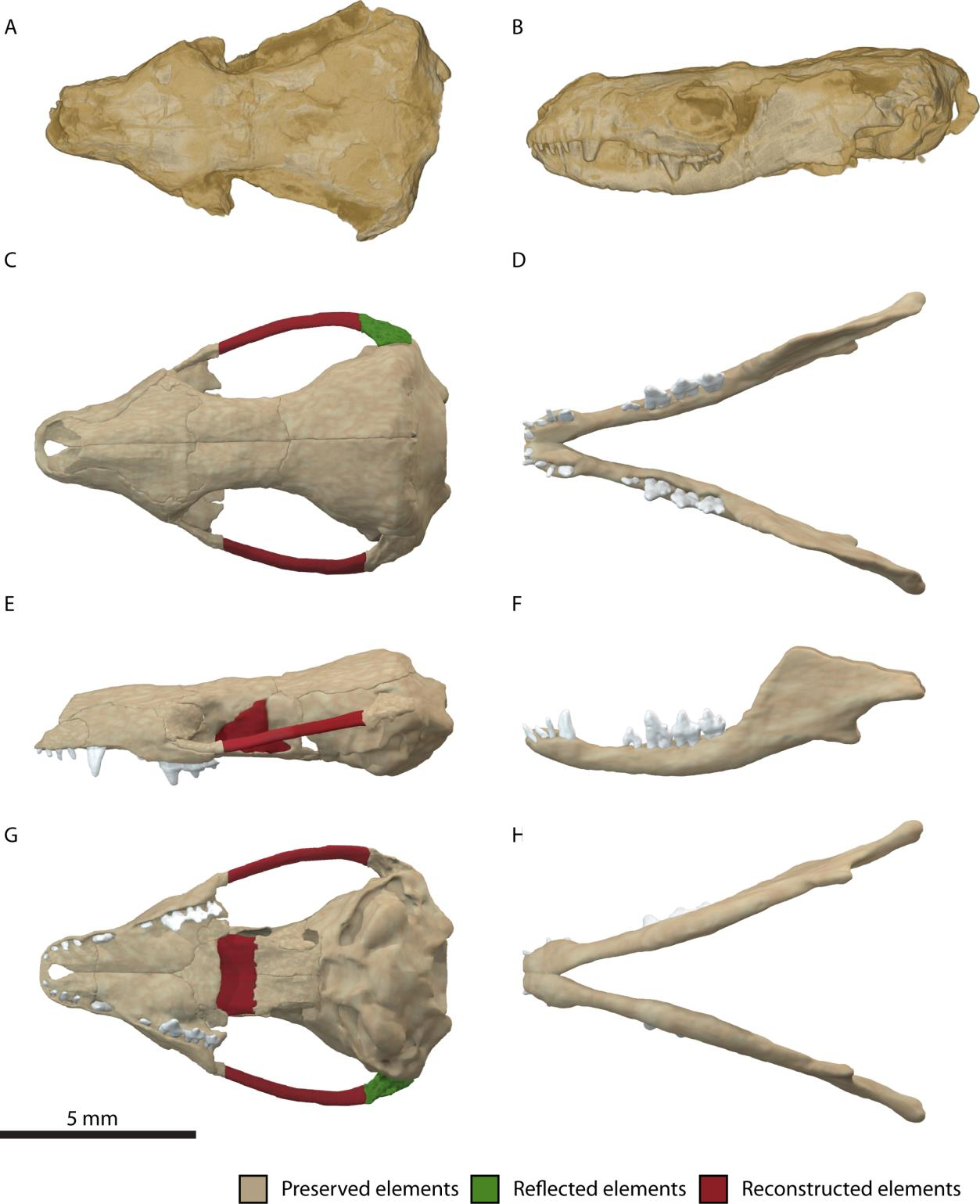

Scientific classification
- Kingdom: Animalia
- Phylum: Chordata
- Clade: Synapsida
- Clade: Therapsida
- Clade: Cynodontia
- Clade: Mammaliaformes
- Genus: †Hadrocodium; Luo, Crompton, & Sun, 2001
- Species: †H. wui

Binomial name
- †Hadrocodium wui Luo, Crompton, & Sun, 2001

= Hadrocodium =

Hadrocodium Temporal range: Sinemurian ~195 Ma

Extinct genus of mammaliaforms

Hadrocodium is an extinct genus of mammaliaform that lived during the Sinemurian stage of the Early Jurassic approximately 195 million years ago in the Lufeng Formation in what is now the Yunnan province in south-western China (25.2°N 102.1°E, paleocoordinates 34.3°N 104.9°E). It contains a single species, H. wui, and is considered the closest relative of the class Mammalia.

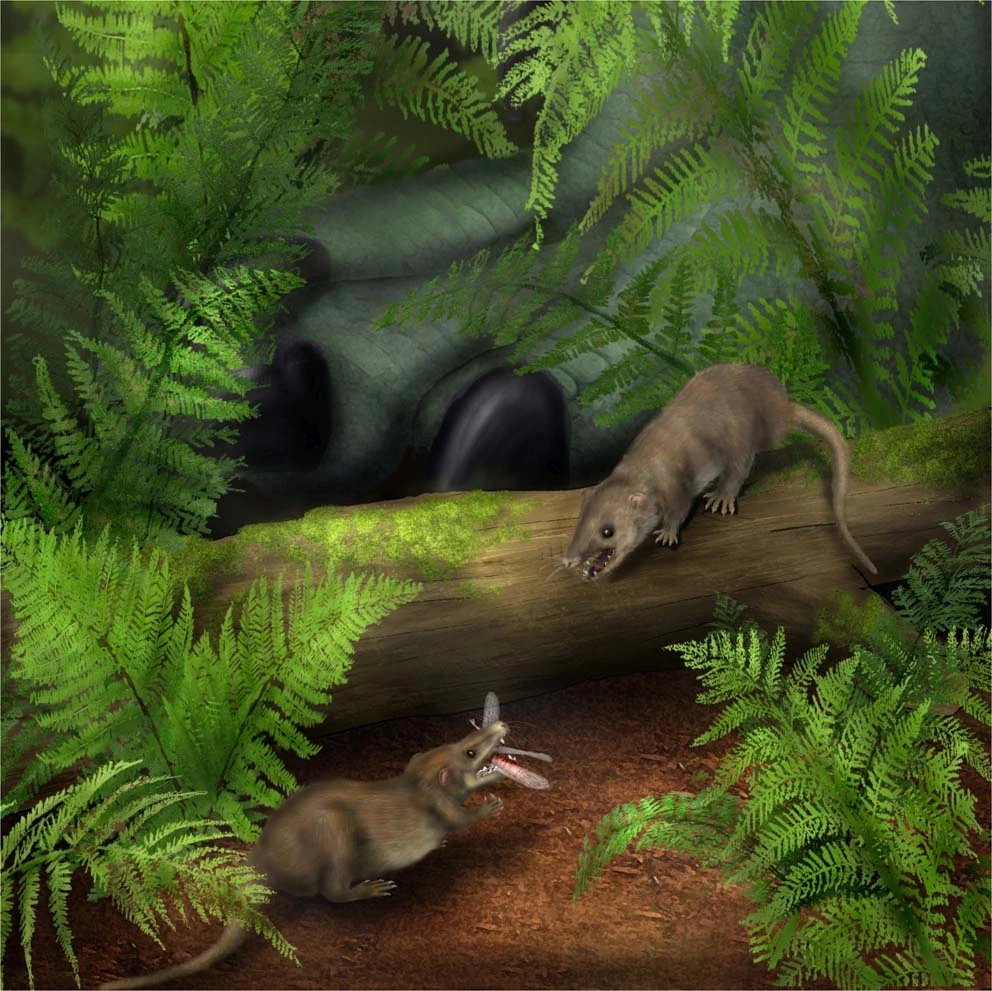
Life restoration

The fossil of this mouse-like, paper-clip sized animal was discovered in 1985 but was then interpreted as a juvenile morganucodontid. Hadrocodium remained undescribed until 2001; since then its large brain and advanced ear structure have greatly influenced the interpretation of the earliest stages of mammalian evolution, as these mammalian characters could previously be traced only to some 150 million years ago. Hadrocodium is known only from a skull 1.2 cm (0.47 in) long, and its body would have measured 3.2 cm (1.3 in) long in total and weighed up to 2 g (0.071 oz), making it one of the smallest Mesozoic mammaliaforms. The specimen is thought to have been that of a mature adult.

The name Hadrocodium alludes to its large cranial cavity, deriving from the Greek word hadrós (ἁδρός 'large, heavy, fullness') and the Latin word codium, from Greek kṓdeia (κώδεια 'head [of a plant]'). The species name, wui, is the Latinized version of discoverer Xiao-Chun Wu's name.

While initially suggested to have possessed a fully mammalian ear akin to those of modern mammals, a 2022 restudy suggested that it actually had a primitive mandibular middle ear similar to those of other primitive mammaliaforms. In 2025, Tumelty and Lautenschlager examined the cranium and mandible of Hadrocodium in comparison with those of modern moles and shrews, and concluded that Hadrocodium might have fed on softer invertebrates and that it's probably not a fully fossorial animal.

== Phylogeny ==
- Cynodontia
  - - Dvinia
    - Procynosuchidae
  - Epicynodontia
    - Thrinaxodon
    - Eucynodontia
      - - Cynognathus
        - - Tritylodontidae
          - Traversodontidae
      - Probainognathia
        - - Tritheledontidae
          - Chiniquodontidae
        - - Prozostrodon
          - Mammaliaformes
            - Morganucodontidae
            - - Docodonta
              - - Hadrocodium
                - - Kuehneotheriidae
                  - crown group Mammals

Phylogeny

- Mammaliaformes
  - Adelobasileus
  - - Sinoconodon
    - - - Morganucodon
        - Megazostrodon
      - - Haramiyida
        - - - Haldanodon
            - Castorocauda
          - - Hadrocodium
            - Mammalia

== See also ==
- Smallest organisms
- Evolution of mammalian auditory ossicles
