= Bridetherium =

Bridetherium Temporal range: Hettangian ~201–190 Ma

Scientific classification
- Domain: Eukaryota
- Kingdom: Animalia
- Phylum: Chordata
- Clade: Synapsida
- Clade: Therapsida
- Clade: Cynodontia
- Clade: Mammaliaformes
- Order: †Morganucodonta
- Genus: †Bridetherium; Clemens, 2011
- Species: †B. dorisae

Binomial name
- †Bridetherium dorisae Clemens, 2011

Extinct genus of mammaliaforms

Bridetherium is an extinct genus of morganucodontan from Early Jurassic deposits of southern Wales, United Kingdom. Bridetherium is known from some isolated upper and lower molariform. It was collected in the Pant Quarry, Vale of Glamorgan. It was first named by William A. Clemens Jr. in 2011 and the type species is Bridetherium dorisae. The species name is in honour of early mammal paleontologist Doris Mary Kermack.
