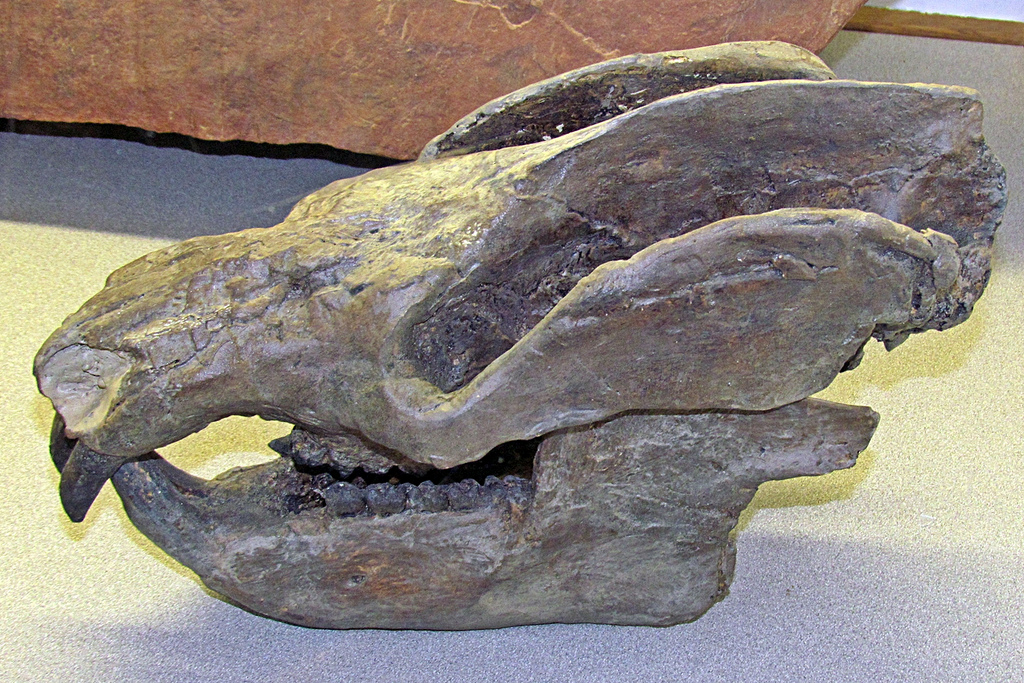
- Skull of Kayentatherium wellesi, a tritylodontid
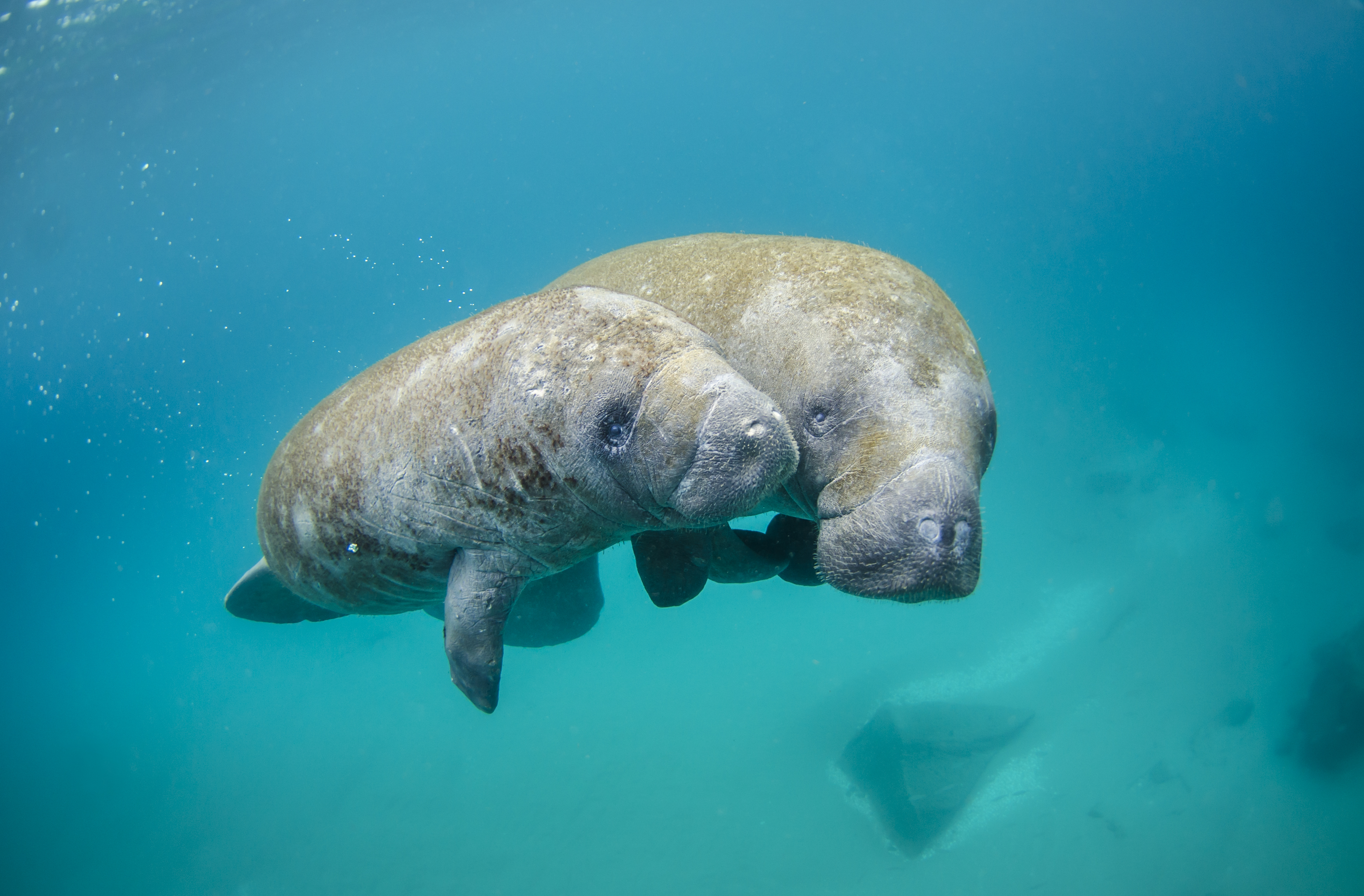
- Manatee

Scientific classification
- Kingdom: Animalia
- Phylum: Chordata
- Clade: Synapsida
- Clade: Therapsida
- Clade: Cynodontia
- Clade: Prozostrodontia
- Clade: Mammaliamorpha; Rowe, 1988

Subgroups
- †Adelobasileus; †Botucaraitherium; †Brasilodon; †Pseudotherium?; †Sinoconodon; †Tikiodon; †Tritylodontidae; †Tritheledontidae?; Mammaliaformes

= Mammaliamorpha =

Mammaliamorphs Temporal range: Late Triassic (Carnian), 232–0 Ma

Clade of mammals and extinct relatives

Mammaliamorpha is a clade of cynodonts. It contains the clades Tritylodontidae and Mammaliaformes, as well as a few genera that do not belong to either of these groups. The family Tritheledontidae has also been placed in Mammaliamorpha by some phylogenetic analyses, but has been recovered outside the clade by others. According to a 2022 study based on inner ear anatomy, Mammaliamorpha may be the clade in which endothermy ("warm-bloodedness") first appeared in the mammalian lineage.

== Classification ==
Mammaliamorpha was named in 1988 by the American palaeontologist Timothy B. Rowe, who defined it as comprising "the last common ancestor of Tritylodontidae and Mammalia, and all its descendants".

The cladogram below is adapted from the 2019 description of the mammaliamorph Pseudotherium by Rachel V. S. Wallace and colleagues:

- Probainognathia
  - Probainognathus
  - - Prozostrodon
    - - Therioherpeton
      - - Tritheledontidae
          - Pachygenelus
          - Riograndia
        - Mammaliamorpha
          - - Pseudotherium
            - Tritylodontidae
              - Oligokyphus
              - - Kayentatherium
                - - Bienotherium
                  - Tritylodon
          - - Botucaraitherium
            - - Brasilodontidae
                - Brasilitherium
                - Brasilodon
              - - Sinoconodon
                - Mammaliaformes
                  - Morganucodon
                  - Mammalia
