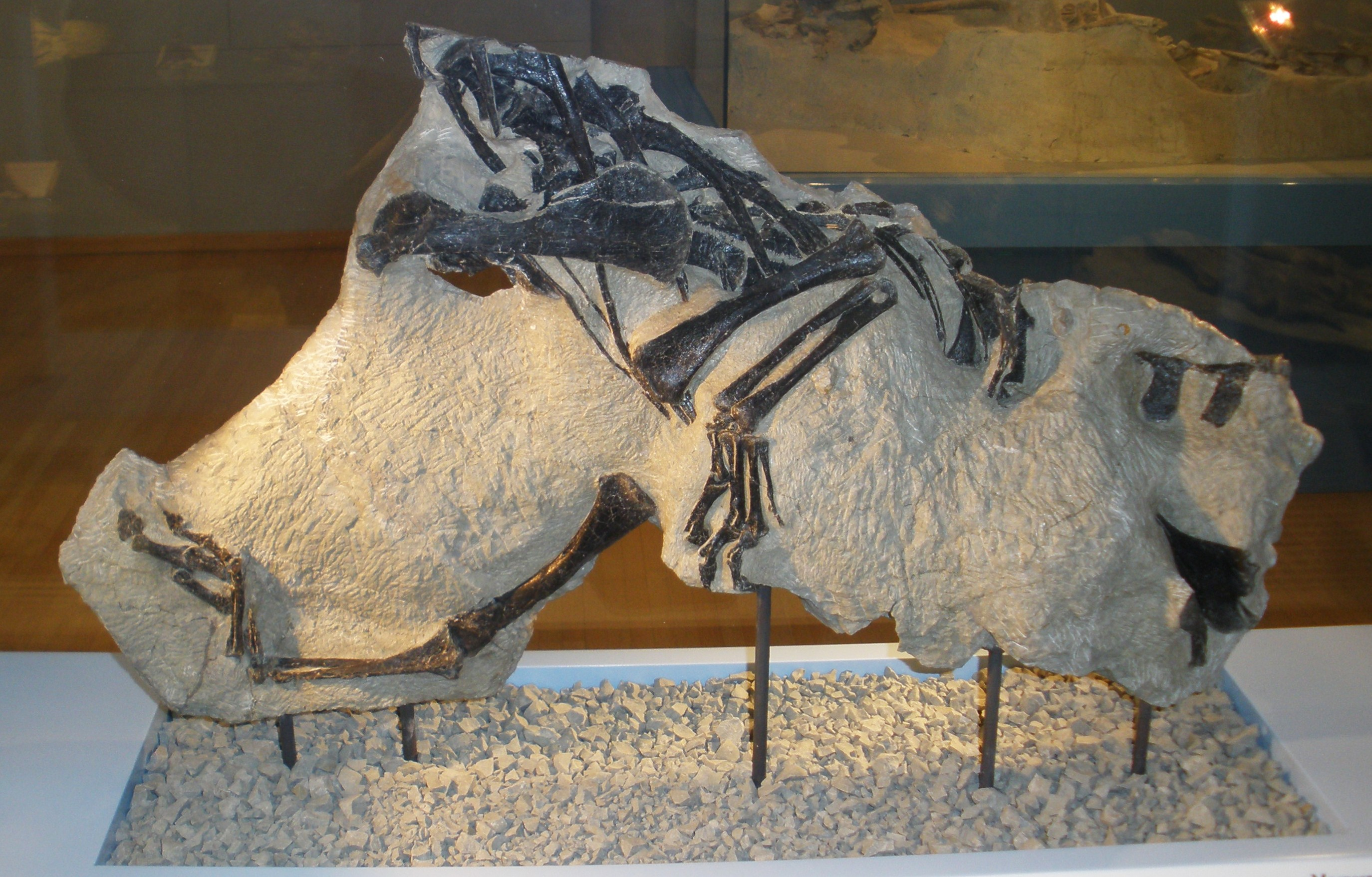
- Holotype specimen in Sauriermuseum Frick

Scientific classification
- Kingdom: Animalia
- Phylum: Chordata
- Class: Reptilia
- Clade: Dinosauria
- Clade: Saurischia
- Clade: Theropoda
- Clade: Averostriformes
- Genus: †Notatesseraeraptor; Zahner & Brinkmann, 2019
- Species: †N. frickensis

Binomial name
- †Notatesseraeraptor frickensis Zahner & Brinkmann, 2019

= Notatesseraeraptor =

Notatesseraeraptor Temporal range: Late Triassic, ~209 Ma

Genus of reptiles (fossil)

Notatesseraeraptor ("feature mosaic tile thief"; from the Latin "nota", feature; "tesserae", tiles used to make a mosaic, in reference to the mixture of features normally found on dilophosaurids and coelophysoids; and "raptor", thief) is a genus of carnivorous theropod dinosaur that lived during the Late Triassic of what is now Switzerland. It was found in the Gruhalde Member of the Klettgau Formation. It was an early member of Neotheropoda with affinities to Dilophosaurus and Averostra. The new genus and species Notatesseraeraptor frickensis was named by Marion Zahner and colleagues in 2019.

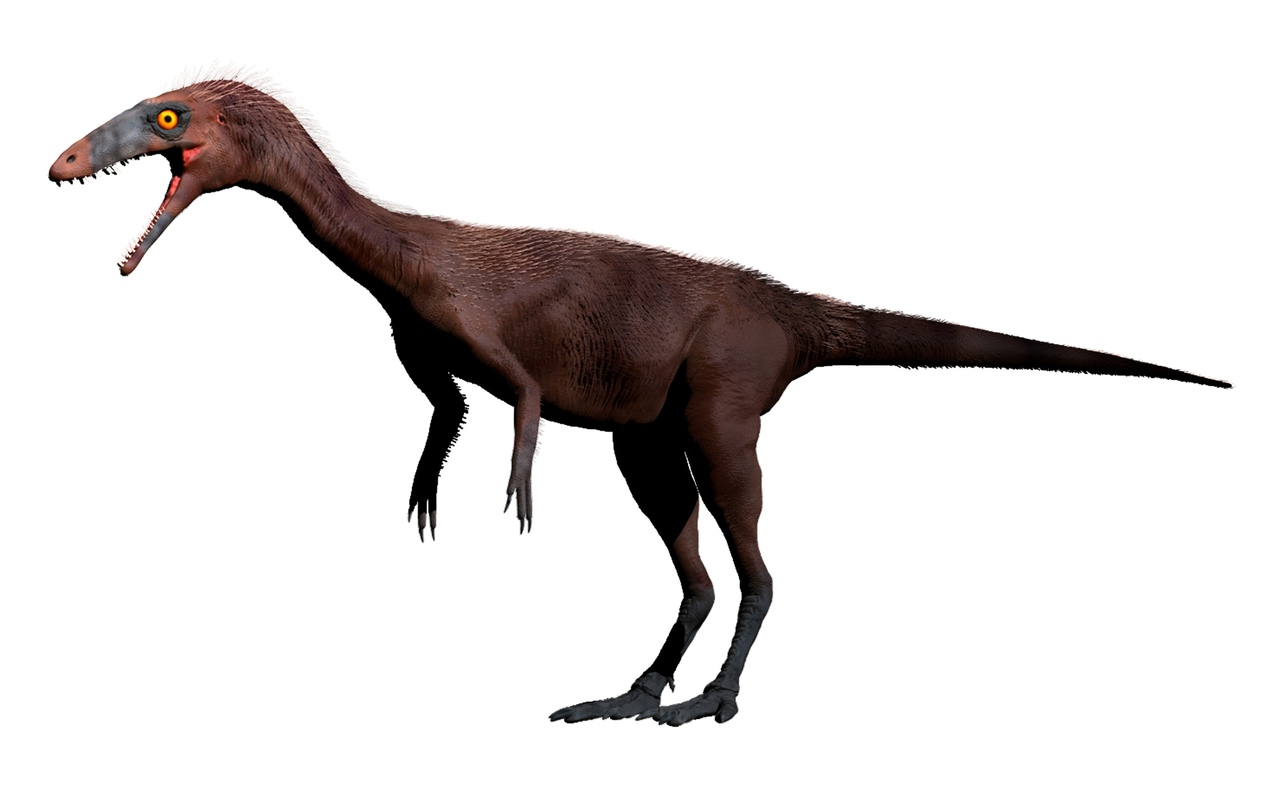
Life restoration

Since 1961, at the clay pit of Gruhalde, exploited by Tonwerke Keller, numerous fossils of Plateosaurus have been found. At a somewhat higher layer, in the spring of 2006, amateur paleontologist Michael Fisher discovered the postcranial skeleton of a small theropod. In 2009, the skull was secured. The fossils were unearthed and prepared by Ben Pabst and team. Initially the skeleton was provisionally referred to Coelophysidae. In 2008, parts of the postcranial skeleton were described in a master's thesis by Jasmina Christine Hugi. Lui Unterassner described the shoulder girdle and stomach content in his thesis of 2009, while Marion Zahner dedicated a thesis to the skull in 2014.

Size comparison

In 2019, the type species Notatesseraeraptor frickensis gen. et sp. nov. was named and described by Marion Zahner and Winand Brinkmann. The generic name combines the Latin nota - "trait", tesserae - "mosaic tiles", and raptor - "thief". It refers to it being a carnivorous species showing a mix of traits of the Dilophosauridae and Coelophysoidea. The specific name refers to a provenance from the municipality of Frick in the Aargau. It represents the first Mesozoic theropod named from Switzerland.
