= David F. Cutler =

English botanist

David Frederick Cutler PPLS (born 1939) is an English botanist and plant anatomist.

== Life ==
David Cutler was born in 1939. He was educated at the University of Leeds, BSc (Hons) 1962, and Imperial College London, PhD 1965.

Cutler worked as a plant anatomist at the Royal Botanic Gardens, Kew from 1962. He retired in 1999 as deputy keeper and head of the Plant Anatomy Section, Jodrell Laboratory, Kew. Cutler edited the journal Annals of Botany between 1984 and 1990. He currently holds the positions of honorary research fellow at the Royal Botanic Gardens, visiting professor in botany at the University of Reading and honorary lecturer at Imperial College, London.

Cutler was president of the Linnean Society of London (2006–2009), and president of the Kew Guild (2003–2004). He was awarded the Linnean Gold Medal in 1999, for outstanding services to the Linnean Society. Until 2020 he was the chairman of the 'Taxonomy and Systematics Committee' and 'Secretary for Strategy' of the Linnean Society.

His research interests are in pure and applied plant anatomy, including the systematic anatomy of angiosperms, functional aspects of plant structure and the identification of fragmentary plant material.

=== Selected publications ===
The standard author abbreviation D.F.Cutler is used to indicate this person as the author when citing a botanical name.

- Cutler, D.F., Botha, E. & Stevenson, D.W. (2008) Plant Anatomy. An Applied approach, Blackwell Publishing
- Gregory, M. & Cutler, D. F. (eds) (2002) Anatomy of the Monocotyledons IX Acoraceae and Araceae, Oxford Science Publications.
- Fahn, A. & Cutler, D. F. (1992) Xerophytes. Encyclopedia of Plant Anatomy, vol. XIII.3. Gebruder Borntraeger.
- Cutler, D. F. & Richardson, I. B. K. (1989) Tree Roots and Buildings, 2nd Edition, revised, reference book. Longman Scientific and Technical.
