= Kuehneotheriidae =

Kuehneotheriids Temporal range: Late Triassic - Early Jurassic, 220–195 Ma

Scientific classification
- Kingdom: Animalia
- Phylum: Chordata
- Clade: Synapsida
- Clade: Therapsida
- Clade: Cynodontia
- Clade: Mammaliaformes
- Superlegion: †Kuehneotheria; McKenna, 1975
- Family: †Kuehneotheriidae; Kermack, Kermack, & Mussett, 1968

Type species
- †Kuehneotherium praecursoris Kermack, Kermack, & Mussett, 1968

Genera
- †Fluctuodon; †Indotherium?; †Kotatherium?; †Kuehneon?; †Kuehneotherium; †Trishulotherium?

Extinct family of mammaliaforms

Kuehneotheriidae is an extinct family of mammaliaforms traditionally placed within 'Symmetrodonta', though now generally considered more basal than true symmetrodonts. All members of Kuehneotheriidae which have been found so far are represented only by teeth, but these teeth have features which have led paleontologists to classify kuehneotheriids as very close relatives of the first true mammals. But fossil clades based solely on teeth often lead to difficulties (Ausktribosphenidae being a good example), and it is not possible to draw significant conclusions about mammalian evolution from Kuehneotheriidae unless some more complete skeletons are found.

== See also ==
- Evolution of mammals
