= Paceyodon =

Paceyodon Temporal range: Hettangian ~201–190 Ma

Scientific classification
- Domain: Eukaryota
- Kingdom: Animalia
- Phylum: Chordata
- Clade: Synapsida
- Clade: Therapsida
- Clade: Cynodontia
- Clade: Mammaliaformes
- Order: †Morganucodonta
- Genus: †Paceyodon; Clemens, 2011
- Species: †P. davidi

Binomial name
- †Paceyodon davidi Clemens, 2011

Extinct genus of mammaliaforms

Paceyodon is an extinct genus of morganucodontan mammaliaform from Early Jurassic deposits of southern Wales, United Kingdom. Paceyodon is known from an isolated molariform that is significantly larger than any morganucodontan molariform yet discovered. It was collected in the Pant Quarry, Vale of Glamorgan. It was first named by William A. Clemens in 2011 and the type species is Paceyodon davidi.
