= Purbeckodon =

Purbeckodon Temporal range: Early Cretaceous, 140 Ma

Scientific classification
- Kingdom: Animalia
- Phylum: Chordata
- Clade: Synapsida
- Clade: Therapsida
- Clade: Cynodontia
- Clade: Mammaliaformes
- Order: †Morganucodonta (?)
- Genus: †Purbeckodon; Butler, Sigogneau-Russell & Ensom, 2011
- Species: †P. batei

Binomial name
- †Purbeckodon batei Butler, Sigogneau-Russell & Ensom, 2011

Extinct genus of mammaliaforms

Purbeckodon is an extinct genus of mammaliaforms, possibly belonging to Morganucodonta, that is known from Early Cretaceous deposits of southeastern Dorset, England. It was collected in the Purbeck Limestone Group of Dorset. It was first named by Percy M. Butler, Denise Sigogneau-Russell and Paul C. Ensom in 2011 and the type species is Purbeckodon batei.
