= Polonodon =

Polonodon Temporal range: Late Triassic, Carnian

Scientific classification
- Kingdom: Animalia
- Phylum: Chordata
- Clade: Synapsida
- Clade: Therapsida
- Clade: Cynodontia
- Family: †Dromatheriidae
- Genus: †Polonodon; Sulej et al. 2018
- Species: †P. woznikiensis

Binomial name
- †Polonodon woznikiensis Sulej et al. 2018

Extinct genus of cynodonts

Polonodon is an extinct genus of dromatheriid cynodonts that lived in what is now Poland during the Carnian stage of the Late Triassic. It includes one species, Polonodon woznikiensis, which is known only from isolated teeth.
