= Inditherium =

Inditherium Temporal range: Late Triassic

Scientific classification
- Domain: Eukaryota
- Kingdom: Animalia
- Phylum: Chordata
- Clade: Synapsida
- Clade: Therapsida
- Clade: Cynodontia
- Family: †Dromatheriidae
- Genus: †Inditherium; Bhat et al., 2020
- Species: †I. floris

Binomial name
- †Inditherium floris Bhat et al., 2020

Extinct genus of cynodonts

Inditherium is an extinct genus of dromatheriid cynodonts that lived in what is now India during the Late Triassic. Its type and only species is Inditherium floris, which is known from three postcanine teeth discovered at the Tiki Formation of Madhya Pradesh.

== Etymology ==
The generic name Inditherium is derived from the country of India and the Greek word therion, meaning "beast". The specific epithet floris is a reference to the flower-shaped crowns of its postcanine teeth.
