= Sinoconodon =

Sinoconodon Temporal range: Sinemurian ~193 Ma
- Life restoration of Sinoconodon rigneyi

Scientific classification
- Kingdom: Animalia
- Phylum: Chordata
- Clade: Synapsida
- Clade: Therapsida
- Clade: Cynodontia
- Clade: Mammaliamorpha
- Order: †Sinoconodontiformes; Kinman, 1994
- Family: †Sinoconodontidae; Mills, 1971
- Genus: †Sinoconodon; Patterson & Olson, 1961
- Species: †S. rigneyi

Binomial name
- †Sinoconodon rigneyi Patterson & Olson, 1961

Synonyms
- List: Genera; Lufengoconodon Young 1982a; Species; Lufengoconodon changchiawaensis Young 1982a; Sinoconodon changchiawaensis (Young 1982) sensu Crompton & Sun 1985; Sinoconodon parringtoni Young 1982; Sinoconodon youngi Zhang 1983

Extinct genus of mammaliamorphs

Sinoconodon is an extinct genus of mammaliamorphs that appears in the fossil record of the Lufeng Formation of China in the Sinemurian stage of the Early Jurassic period, about 193 million years ago. While sharing many plesiomorphic traits with other non-mammaliaform cynodonts, it possessed a special, secondarily evolved jaw joint between the dentary and the squamosal bones, which in more derived taxa would replace the primitive tetrapod one between the articular and quadrate bones. The presence of a dentary-squamosal joint is a trait historically used to define mammals.

== Description ==
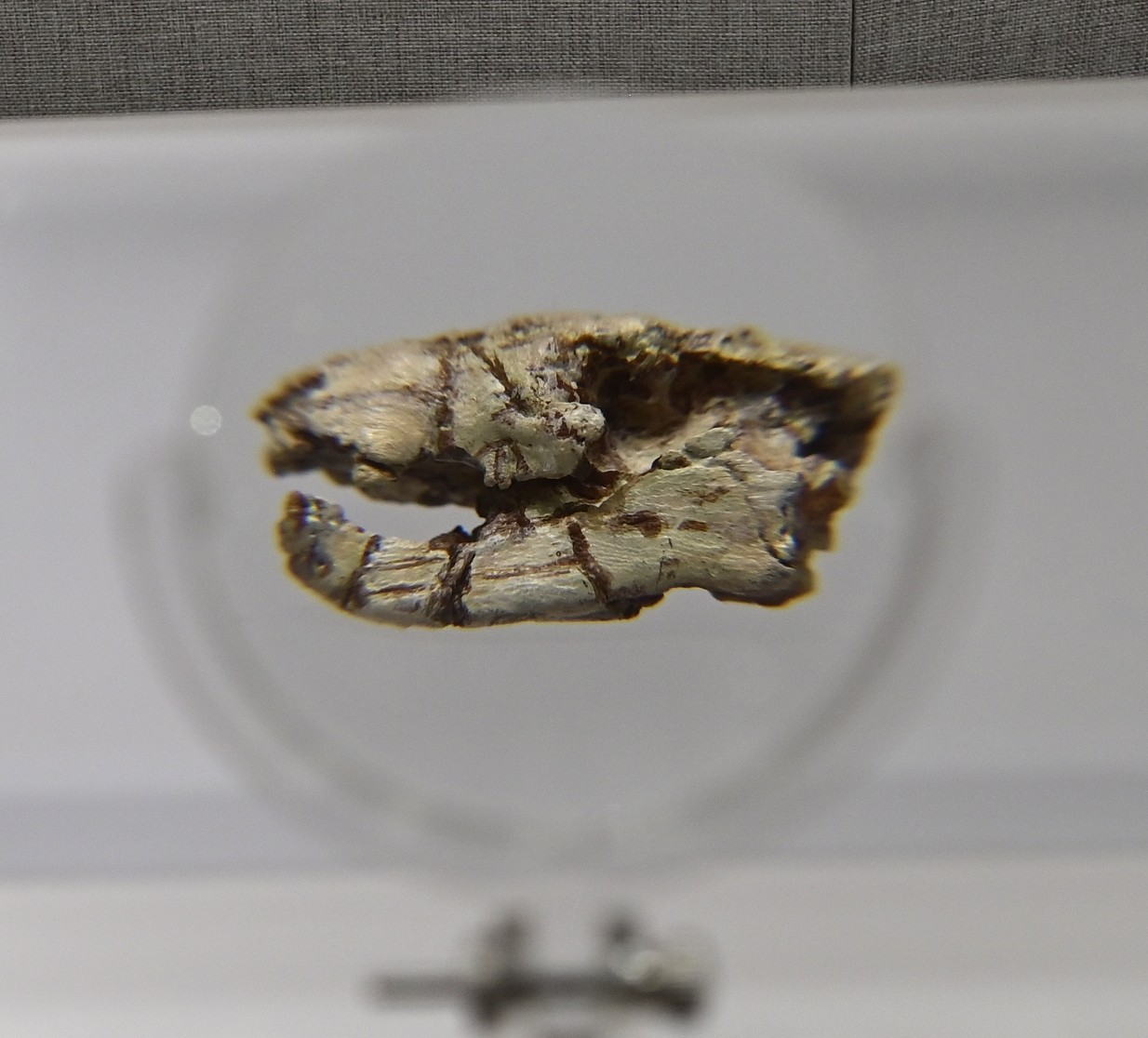
Fossil skull, Baoding Natural History Museum

This animal had a skull of 6 cm (2.4 in), which suggests a presacral body length of 25 cm (9.8 in) and a weight of about 800 g (28 oz) due to the similar parameters to the European hedgehog. Sinoconodon closely resembled early mammaliaforms like Morganucodon, but it is regarded as more basal, differing substantially from Morganucodon in its dentition and growth habits. Like most other non-mammalian tetrapods, such as reptiles and amphibians, it was polyphyodont, replacing many of its teeth throughout its lifetime, and it seems to have grown slowly but continuously until its death. It was thus somewhat less mammal-like than mammaliaforms such as morganucodonts and docodonts. The combination of basal tetrapod and mammalian features makes it a unique transitional fossil.

== Taxonomy ==
Sinoconodon was named by Patterson and Olson in 1961. Its type is Sinoconodon rigneyi. It was assigned to Triconodontidae by Patterson and Olson in 1961; to Triconodonta by Jenkins and Crompton in 1979; to Sinoconodontidae by Carroll in 1988; to Mammaliamorpha by Wible in 1991; to Mammalia by Luo and Wu in 1994; to Mammalia by Kielan-Jaworowska et al. in 2004; and to Mammaliaformes by Luo et al. in 2001 and Bi et al. in 2014.

=== Phylogeny ===
- Mammaliaformes
  - Adelobasileus
  - - Sinoconodon
    - - - Morganucodon
        - Megazostrodon
      - - Haramiyida
        - - - Haldanodon
            - Castorocauda
          - - Hadrocodium
            - Mammalia
