= Indotherium =

Indotherium Temporal range: Early Jurassic

Scientific classification
- Domain: Eukaryota
- Kingdom: Animalia
- Phylum: Chordata
- Clade: Synapsida
- Clade: Therapsida
- Clade: Cynodontia
- Clade: Mammaliaformes
- Order: †Morganucodonta
- Family: †Morganucodontidae (?)
- Genus: †Indotherium; Yadagiri, 1984
- Species: †I. pranhitai

Binomial name
- †Indotherium pranhitai Yadagiri, 1984

Extinct genus of mammaliaforms

Indotherium is an extinct genus of mammaliaforms that lived in what is now India during the Early Jurassic. It contains one species, I. pranhitai, which is known from two upper molar teeth found in the Kota Formation of Telangana. When it was first described, it was assigned to the paraphyletic group "Symmetrodonta", but later studies have reinterpreted it as a possible member of the family Morganucodontidae.
