= Hugh Synge =

English botanist

Hugh Synge (1951-2018) was an English botanist of Anglo-Irish descent who championed endangered plants. In 2007, he was voted one of the 20 most influential British conservationists by BBC Wildlife readers.

Synge attended Rugby School, which he disliked, and then studied horticulture at Wye College from where he volunteered then joined the staff of Kew Gardens.

He was founder and editor of Plant Talk magazine and wrote Kew's Threatened Plants newsletter. With fellow Kew conservationist Ronald Melville, Synge created an early threatened plants database which was taken up by the World Conservation Monitoring Centre. He was co-founder of charity Plantlife; a consultant to the World Health Organization, and later ran a community solar energy business in Tisbury.

Synge's father was journal editor and plant collector Patrick Millington Synge, and mother, singer Margaret Georgiana Chenevix Trench. His father's cousin was Irish playwright and poet J M Synge.
