= Tricuspes =

Tricuspes Temporal range: Rhaetian Late Triassic (Rhaetian)

Scientific classification
- Domain: Eukaryota
- Kingdom: Animalia
- Phylum: Chordata
- Clade: Synapsida
- Clade: Therapsida
- Clade: Cynodontia
- Family: †Dromatheriidae
- Genus: †Tricuspes; Huene, 1933

Species
- T. tubingensis (Huene, 1933); T. sigogneauae (Hahn et al., 1994); T. tapeinodon (Godefroit and Battail, 1997)

Extinct genus of cynodonts

Tricuspes is an extinct genus of cynodonts that lived in what would be Europe during the Triassic from 203.6 to 199.6 mya, existing for approximately 4 million years. Three species are known: Tricuspes tubingensis (Huene, 1933), Tricuspes sigogneauae (Hahn et al., 1994) and Tricuspes tapeinodon (Godefroit and Battail, 1997), which are all from the Late Triassic (Rhaetian) period in continental Europe.

== Places of discovery ==
Teeth of Tricuspes tubingensis have been found at the following locations:

- Saint-Nicolas-de-Port
- Medernach
- Baden-Württemberg
- Kanton Schaffhausen

== Dentition ==
This genus is represented only by isolated teeth found in continental Europe. Its postcanine molariform teeth are tricuspate or tetracuspate and the tooth roots are incipiently divided.
