= Dromatheriidae =

Dromatheriidae Temporal range: Late Triassic

Scientific classification
- Kingdom: Animalia
- Phylum: Chordata
- Clade: Synapsida
- Clade: Therapsida
- Clade: Cynodontia
- Clade: Prozostrodontia
- Family: †Dromatheriidae; Gill, 1872

Genera
- †Deccanodon; †Dromatherium; †Inditherium; †Meurthodon?; †Microconodon; †Polonodon; †Pseudotriconodon; †Rewaconodon; †Therioherpeton?; †Tricuspes

Extinct family of cynodonts

Dromatheriidae is an extinct family of prozostrodontian cynodonts, closely related to mammals. Members of the family are known from the Late Triassic (Carnian to Rhaetian) of India, Europe and North America. Apart from a few jaw fragments, dromatheriids are mainly known from their sectorial (flesh-slicing) postcanine teeth. The teeth were fairly typical among early prozostrodontians, as they were labiolingually compressed (flattened sideways), with a single root and crown hosting a longitudinal row of sharp cusps. Dromatheriids in particular have a very narrow and symmetrical crown (when seen from above) without a prominent cingulum (a ridge or array of cuspules adjacent to the main cusps).

Dromatheriid teeth on average have four main cusps, though some have as few as two (Dromatherium) or three (Tricuspes), or as many as six (Inditherium, Pseudotriconodon). Although the teeth have a single root, a vertical furrow on each side of the root appears to be a trait incipient towards the two fully divided roots of mammaliaforms. Making note of this condition, some authors have suggested that dromatheriids are a paraphyletic group ancestral to mammaliaforms. Other studies instead consider the closest relatives of dromatheriids to be the "therioherpetids" Therioherpeton and Meurthodon, which may even be placed within the family. However, the broader cusps of Therioherpeton and the divided root of Meurthodon dissuade their position within Dromatheriidae.
