= Alfred W. Crompton =

South African paleontologist and zoologist

Alfred Walter Crompton
- Born: 21 February 1927 (age 99); Durban, South Africa
- Scientific career
- Fields: Paleontology zoology
- Workplaces: Harvard University

Alfred Walter "Fuzz" Crompton (born 21 February 1927 in Durban) is a South African paleontologist and zoologist.

Crompton studied at the University of Stellenbosch and obtained a bachelor's degree in 1947 and a masters in 1949, in zoology. He completed his PhD at Cambridge University in 1953.

From 1954 to 1956 Crompton curated the national paleontological museum at Bloemfontein, and from 1956 to 1964 directed the South African Museum in Cape Town, where he also lectured at the university. From 1964 to 1970 he was a professor of biology and geology at Yale University, and Director of the Peabody Museum of Natural History. From 1970 to 1982 he directed the Museum of Comparative Zoology at Harvard, and from 1970 until 1999 was a professor at Harvard University (Fisher Professor of Natural History). In 1999 Crompton was named the emeritus Fisher Research Professor of Natural History.

In 1976/77 and 1983/64 Crompton was a Guggenheim Fellow. He is a Fellow in the American Academy of Arts and Sciences (1969) and the American Association for the Advancement of Science. In 2011 he received the Romer-Simpson-Medal.
