= Percy M. Butler =

British zoologist

Percy Milton Butler
- Born: 19 July 1912; Lewisham, London
- Died: 7 February 2015 (aged 102)
- Awards: Romer-Simpson Medal

Academic background
- Education: Pembroke College, Cambridge
- Thesis: (1939)
- Doctoral advisor: Clive Forster-Cooper

Academic work
- Institutions: Royal Holloway, University of London
- Notable ideas: Butler's Field Theory

Percy Milton Butler (19 July 1912 – 7 February 2015) was a British zoologist and palaeontologist. He proposed that dental characters are expressed in morphogenetic gradients along the dentition, which could therefore be used to study evolution. This became known as Butler's Field Theory. He was Professor of Zoology at Royal Holloway, University of London, where he was the Head of the Department of Zoology from 1956 to 1972, and where he established the first course on mammalogy in the UK.

== Early life ==
He was born on 19 July 1912 in Lewisham, London, son of a civil servant, Herbert Butler, and his wife Amy. As a child he was already interested in natural history. He graduated and did his PhD under supervision of Clive Forster-Cooper at Pembroke College, Cambridge.

== Career ==
After receiving his undergraduate degree in 1933 Butler received Commonwealth Fund Fellowship to visit Columbia University in 1936. He studied fossil mammal teeth in various museum collections and was associated with William King Gregory at the American Museum of Natural History. He also collected fossil mammals, including a molar of Megacerops. His study of fossil teeth brought him to consider the mechanics of teeth, which led to his field theory, published in 1939.

After appointments at Exeter and Manchester University, he joined Royal Holloway College in 1956. He retired at 60, and as an emeritus professor turned to full-time research, much of it done at the Natural History Museum, London.

Butler was an internationally recognised expert in the origins of early mammals from the Mesozoic. He later got interested in tertiary mammals from East-Africa and the fauna of the Olduvai Gorge, on which he worked with Louis Leakey. In his 80s he still worked on the early mammalian clade Haramiyida.

== Awards and recognition ==
Butler was awarded the American Geological Association’s Gold Medal. In 1986, he received the silver medal of the city of Paris. In 1994, he received and honorary membership of the Society of Vertebrate Paleontology, and in 1996, received the society's prestigious Romer-Simpson Medal.

== Personal life ==
Butler married Lillan Temple in 1941. He was a talented artist. His drawings feature in many of his publications and Royal Holloway College held an exhibition of his watercolours.
