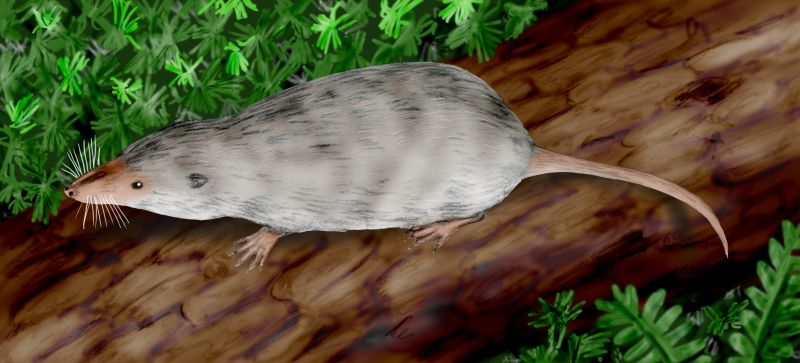
- Life restoration

Scientific classification
- Kingdom: Animalia
- Phylum: Chordata
- Clade: Synapsida
- Clade: Therapsida
- Clade: Cynodontia
- Clade: Mammaliamorpha
- Genus: †Adelobasileus; Lucas & Hunt, 1990
- Species: †A. cromptoni

Binomial name
- †Adelobasileus cromptoni Lucas & Hunt, 1990

= Adelobasileus =

Adelobasileus Temporal range: Late Triassic, 225–220 Ma

Extinct genus of mammaliamorphs

Adelobasileus cromptoni is a species of mammaliamorph cynodonts from the Late Triassic (Carnian), about 225 - 220 million years ago. It is known only from a partial skull recovered from the Tecovas Formation in western Texas.

Distinct cranial features, especially the housing of the cochlea, suggest that Adelobasileus is a transitional form in the character transformation from non-mammaliaform cynodonts to mammaliaforms. For this reason, it is thought to be a close relative of the common ancestor of all modern mammals. Though formerly classified as a mammal by trait-based taxonomy, it is currently placed outside the crown group containing all true mammals.

== Sources ==
- Lucas, SG; Hunt, AP (1990). "The oldest mammal". New Mexico Journal of Science. 30 (1): 41–49.
- Lucas, SG; Luo, Z (September 1993). "Adelobasileus from the upper Triassic of west Texas: the oldest mammal". J. Vertebr. Paleontol. 13 (3): 309–334. doi:10.1080/02724634.1993.10011512.
