= Hampen Railway Cutting =

Geological Site of Special Scientific Interest in Gloucestershire, England

- Site of Special Scientific Interest
- Location within Gloucestershire
- Location of Hampen Railway Cutting.
- Area of search: Gloucestershire
- Grid reference: SP062205
- Coordinates: 51.883477°N 1.910604°W
- Interest: Geological
- Area: 3.9 hectares (9.6 acres)
- Notification date: 1974

Hampen Railway Cutting (grid reference SP062205) is a 3.9-hectare (9.6-acre) geological Site of Special Scientific Interest in Gloucestershire, notified in 1974. The site is listed in the Cotswold District Local Plan 2001–2011 as a Key Wildlife Site (KWS) and Regionally Important Geological Site (RIGS).

== Location and geology ==
The site lies in the Cotswolds National Landscape Area of Outstanding Natural Beauty and is considered one of the best exposures of the Hampen Marly Formation of the Middle Jurassic period. It is a prime research site for understanding the variations in rocks of this age between the Cotswold shelf and the Wessex area.

The site is a sub-unit of the Great Oolite Group and exposes the upper parts of the Hampen, Fuller's Earth and Taynton Limestone formations and the lower parts of the White Limestone Formation.

== SSSI sources ==
- Natural England SSSI information on the citation
- Natural England SSSI information on the Hampen Railway Cutting unit
