= Horsehay Sand Formation =

Coordinates: 51°56′34″N 1°20′15″W

- Stratigraphic range: Bajocian-Bathonian
- Type: Geological formation
- Unit of: Great Oolite Group
- Underlies: Sharp's Hill Formation, Taynton Limestone Formation
- Overlies: Northampton Sand Formation, Whitby Mudstone Formation
- Thickness: up to 7 metres (20 ft)

Lithology
- Primary: Sandstone
- Other: Mudstone, Siltstone

Location
- Region: Europe
- Country: England
- Extent: Oxfordshire, Northamptonshire, Buckinghamshire

Type section
- Location: Horsehay Quarry, Duns Tew

The Horsehay Sand Formation is a geological formation in England. Part of the Great Oolite Group, it was deposited in the Bajocian to Bathonian stages of the Middle Jurassic, the lithology consists of weakly cemented sand and sandstone, with thin interbeds of mudstone and siltstone. Rootlets and lignitic debris are common. It is the lateral equivalent of the Chipping Norton Limestone and the lower part of the Rutland Formation
