= Frome Clay =

Geological formation in England

- Stratigraphic range: Bathonian; ~168–166 Ma
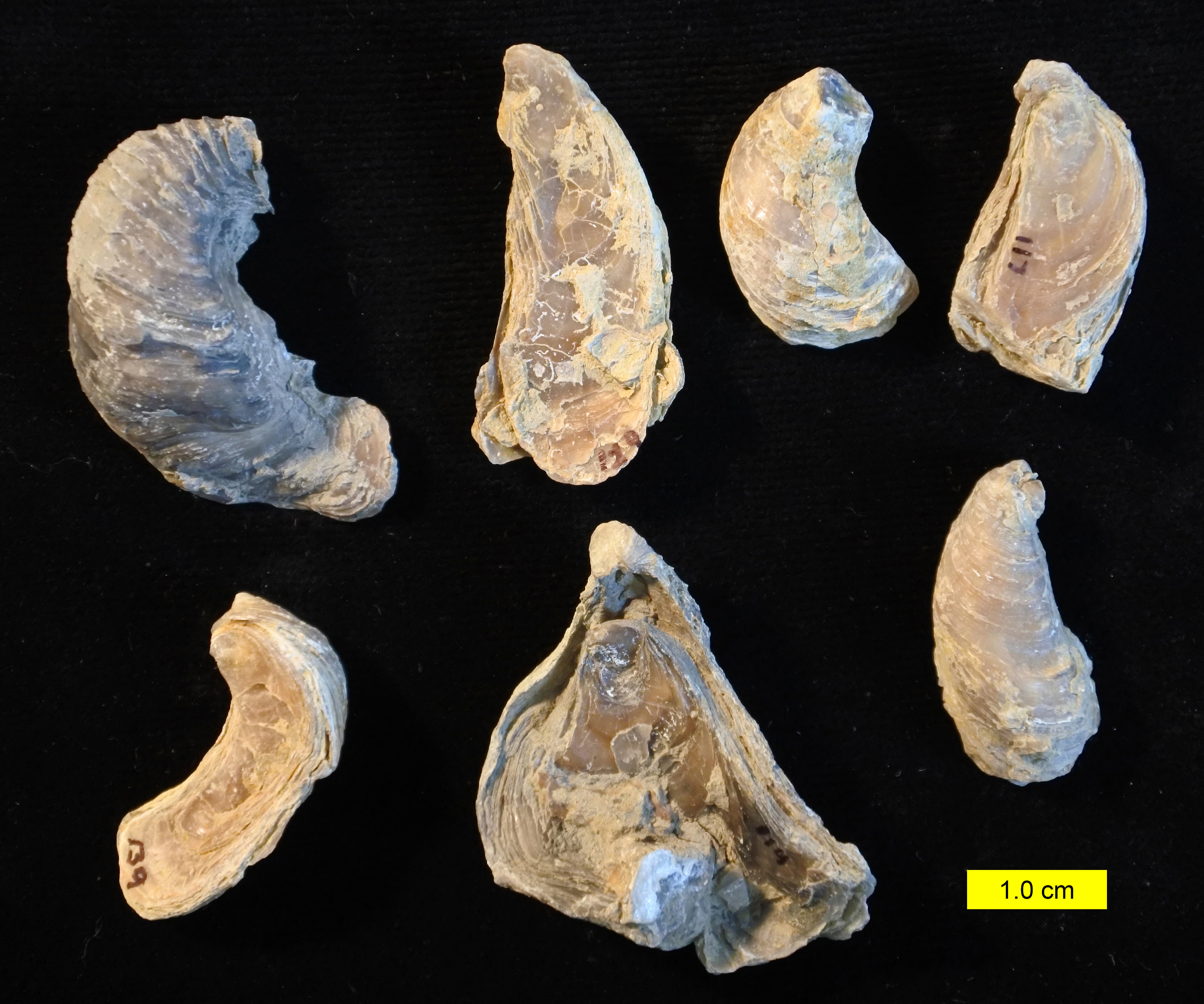
- Fossils from the Frome Clay
- Type: Formation
- Unit of: Great Oolite Group
- Underlies: Forest Marble Formation
- Overlies: Fuller's Earth Formation
- Thickness: 20–50 m (66–164 ft) in Wiltshire and Somerset; 45–70 m (148–230 ft) in Dorset

Lithology
- Primary: Mudstone
- Other: Limestone

Location
- Coordinates: 51.2°N 2.3°W
- Approximate paleocoordinates: 41.4°N 10.1°E
- Region: England
- Country: United Kingdom
- Frome Clay (the United Kingdom) Frome Clay (England)

The Frome Clay is a geological formation in England. It preserves fossils dating back to the Bathonian stage of the Middle Jurassic period.

== See also ==
- List of fossiliferous stratigraphic units in England
