= Chemin de fer du Cambrésis =

Railway in France

The Chemin de fer du Cambrésis (French pronunciation: [ʃəmɛ̃ də fɛʁ dy kɑ̃bʁezi]) was a 120-kilometre (75 mi) long metre gauge railway in the Nord and Aisne departments of France. There were four lines with Caudry at the centre.

== History ==
The Cambrésis railway opened in 1881. It was a voies ferrées d'intérêt local system. From Caudry, lines ran to Cambrai in the north, Denain in the east, Catillon in the south, and St. Quentin Cambrésis in the west.

The first section of line to open was the 26 kilometres (16 mi) section from Cambrai to Le Cateau in 1881, this was extended by 9 kilometres (5.6 mi) to Catillon in 1886. In 1887, a 19 kilometres (12 mi) branch from Caudry to Villers-Outréaux was opened, extended by 6 kilometres (3.7 mi) to Le Catelet-Gouy in 1888. The 28 kilometres (17 mi) line from Caudry to Denain opened in 1891. In 1892, the line was extended by 25 kilometres (16 mi) from Le Catelet-Gouy to St. Quentin Cambrésis, with a final extension of 7 kilometres (4.3 mi) to St. Quentin Nord opening in 1904. Caudry and St. Quentin are only 32 kilometres (20 mi) apart, but the railway took a route that followed contours and avoided heavy engineering, thus lengthening the distance by train.

== Wars ==
=== World War One ===
The Germans destroyed the CF du Cambrésis' infrastructure when they retreated in 1918. The lines were rebuilt, with Caudry - Villers-Outréaux reopening in 1921 and Villers-Outréaux - Saint-Quentin-Cambrésis reopening in 1923. St. Quentin Cambrésis - St. Jean reopened to freight only in 1923. The line west of St. Jean did not reopen after the war.

=== World War Two ===
In 1943, the CF du Cambrésis received three Corpet-Louvet 2-8-2T locomotives that had been destined for the Chemin de Fer Conakry-Niger in French Guinea. These locomotives were numbered 40, 41 and 42 in the CF du Cambrésis fleet. They were returned in 1947, and subsequently delivered to their intended customer.

== Closure ==
Closure occurred in stages. The line between Cambrai and Awoingt closed in 1936. Passenger service ceased between Le Catelet-Gouy and St. Quentin in 1936. Le Catelet-Gouy to St. Quentin Cambrésis closed in 1954, and the entire system except Caudry - Denain closed in 1955. Final closure occurred in 1960.

== Freight ==
The main freight was coal from Denain. Agricultural produce and general merchandise was also carried.

== Locomotives ==
- Three Corpet-Louvet locomotives built in 1881. Cambrai Scrapped in 1936.
- No. 5 Clary Corpet-Louvet 493/1888 0-6-0T. Sold to the Loddington Tramway in the UK, then to the Waltham Iron Ore Tramway. In 2017, preserved at the Irchester Narrow Gauge Railway Museum with nameplates from Cambrai.
- Corpet 2-6-0T locomotives built in 1917, ex tramways de la Côte d'Or
- Pinguely 2-6-0T locomotives built in 1904, ex tramways de la Côte d'Or.
- Piguet 2-6-0T locomotives built in 1914, ex tramways de la Côte d'Or.
- 3 Corpet-Louvet 2-8-2T locomotives, on loan 1944-47. (#40, 41 and 42)
- 3 Corpet-Louvet 2-8-2T locomotives, built 1948. (1924/1948 #40, 1925/1948 #41 (scrapped 1958) and 1926/1948 #42).

== Railcars ==
The CF du Cambrésis had some four-wheeled Renault-Scémia railcars. These were only used on the lightest of trains.

== Gallery ==
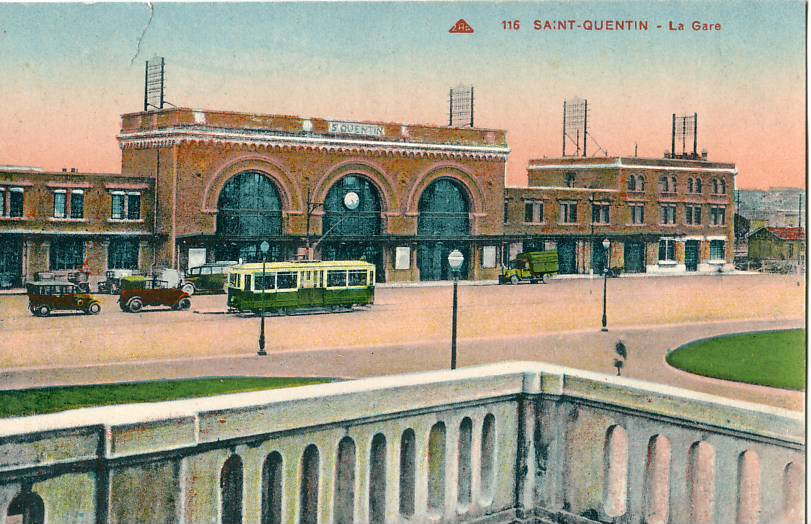
St-Quentin (Nord network) station.

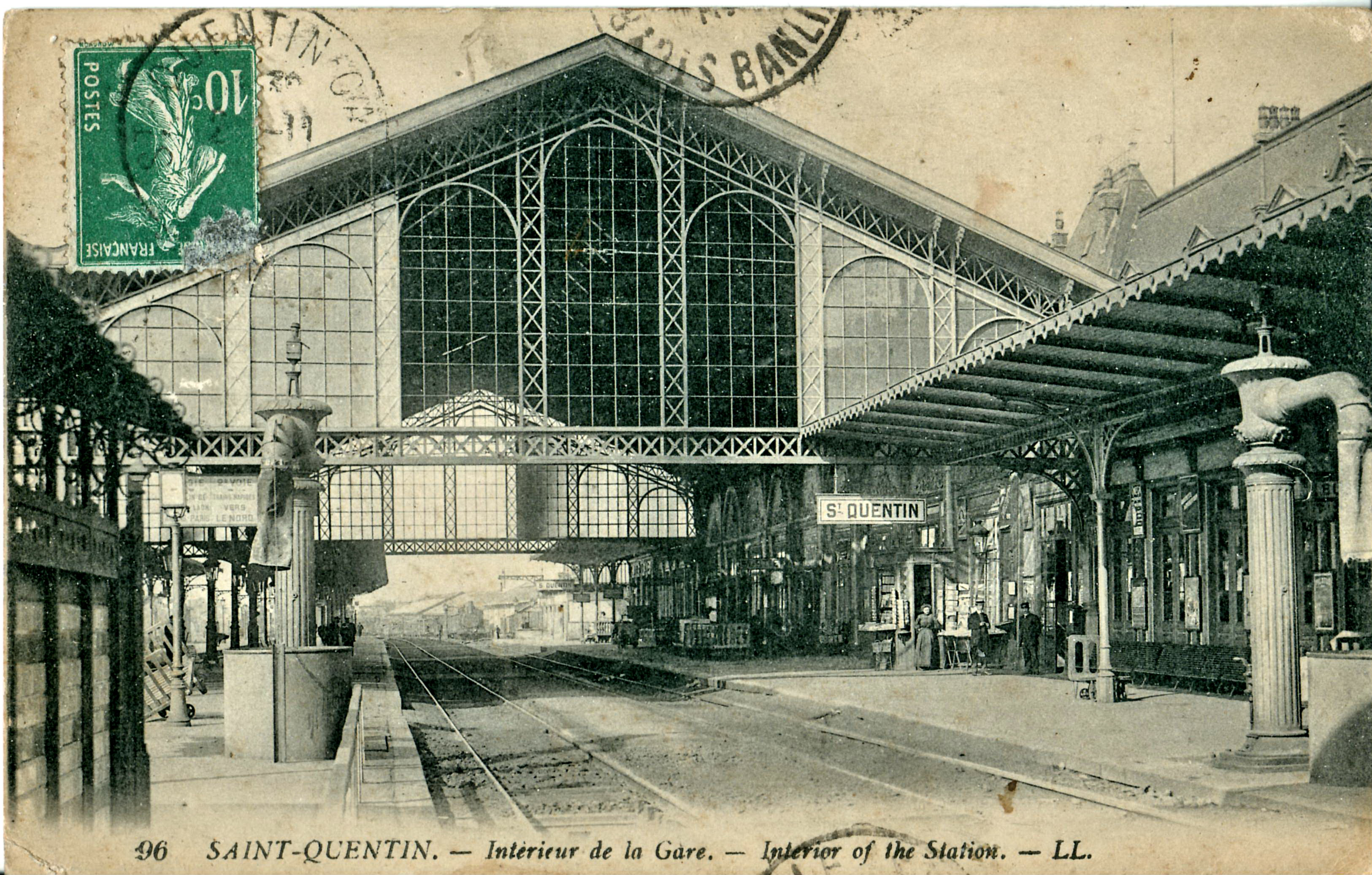
St-Quentin (Nord network) station.

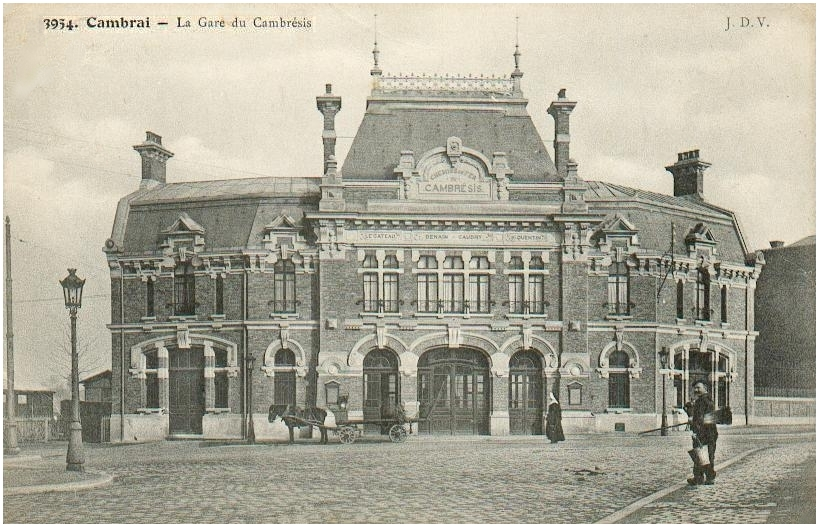
Cambrai station.

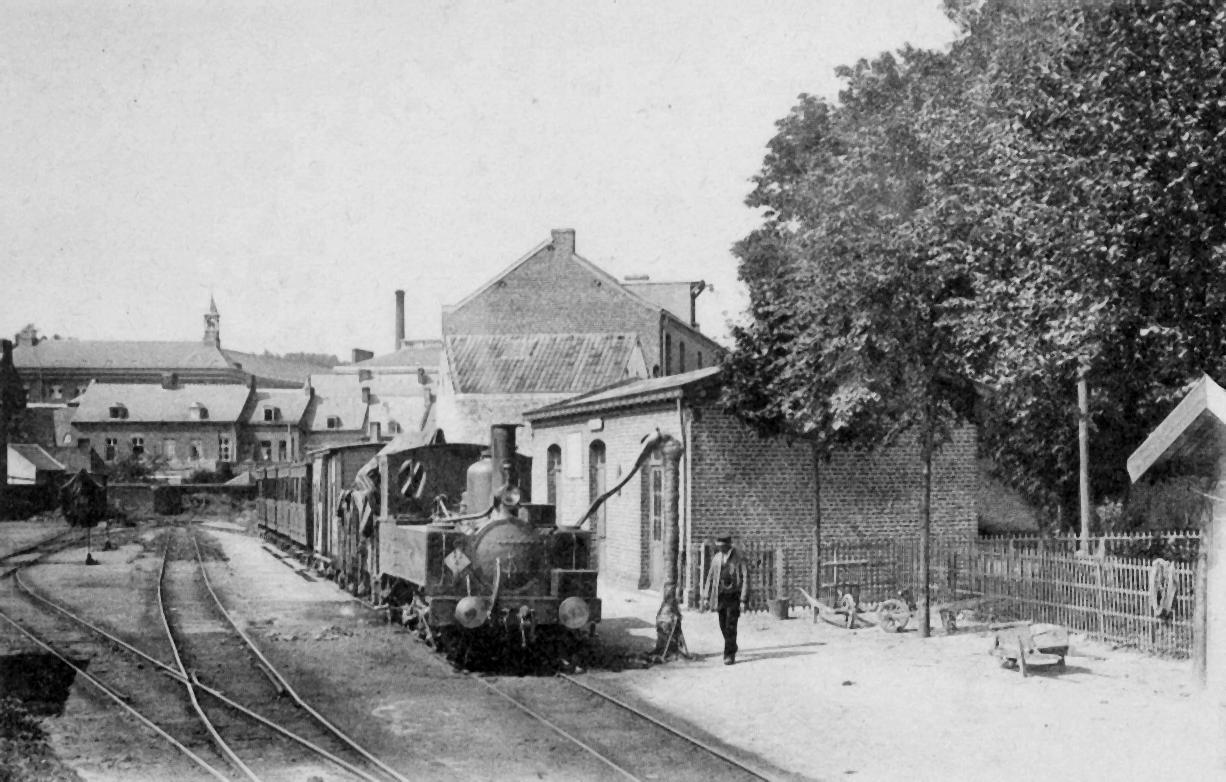
Le Cateau station at the beginning of the 20th century

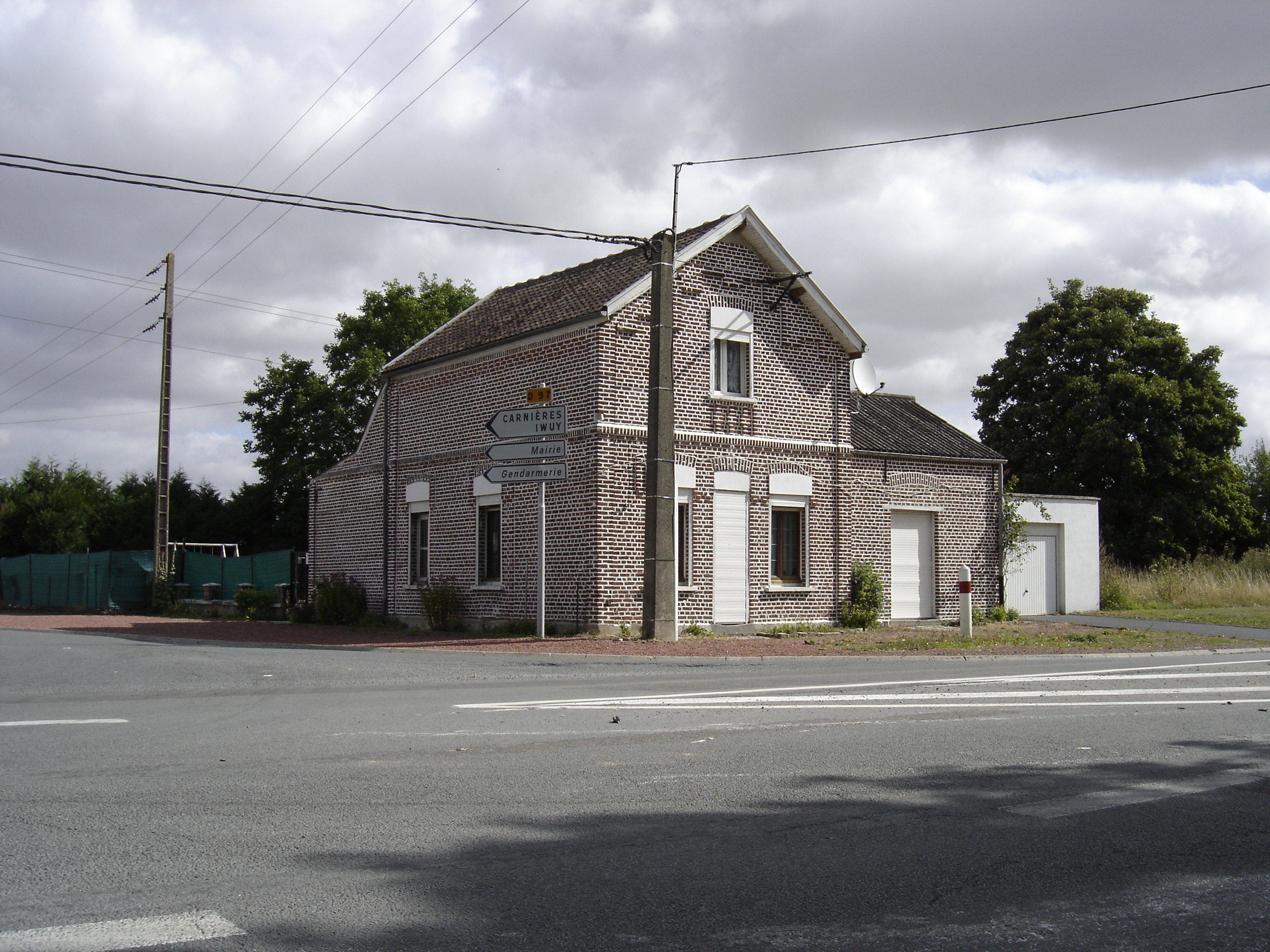
Carnières station, August 2009

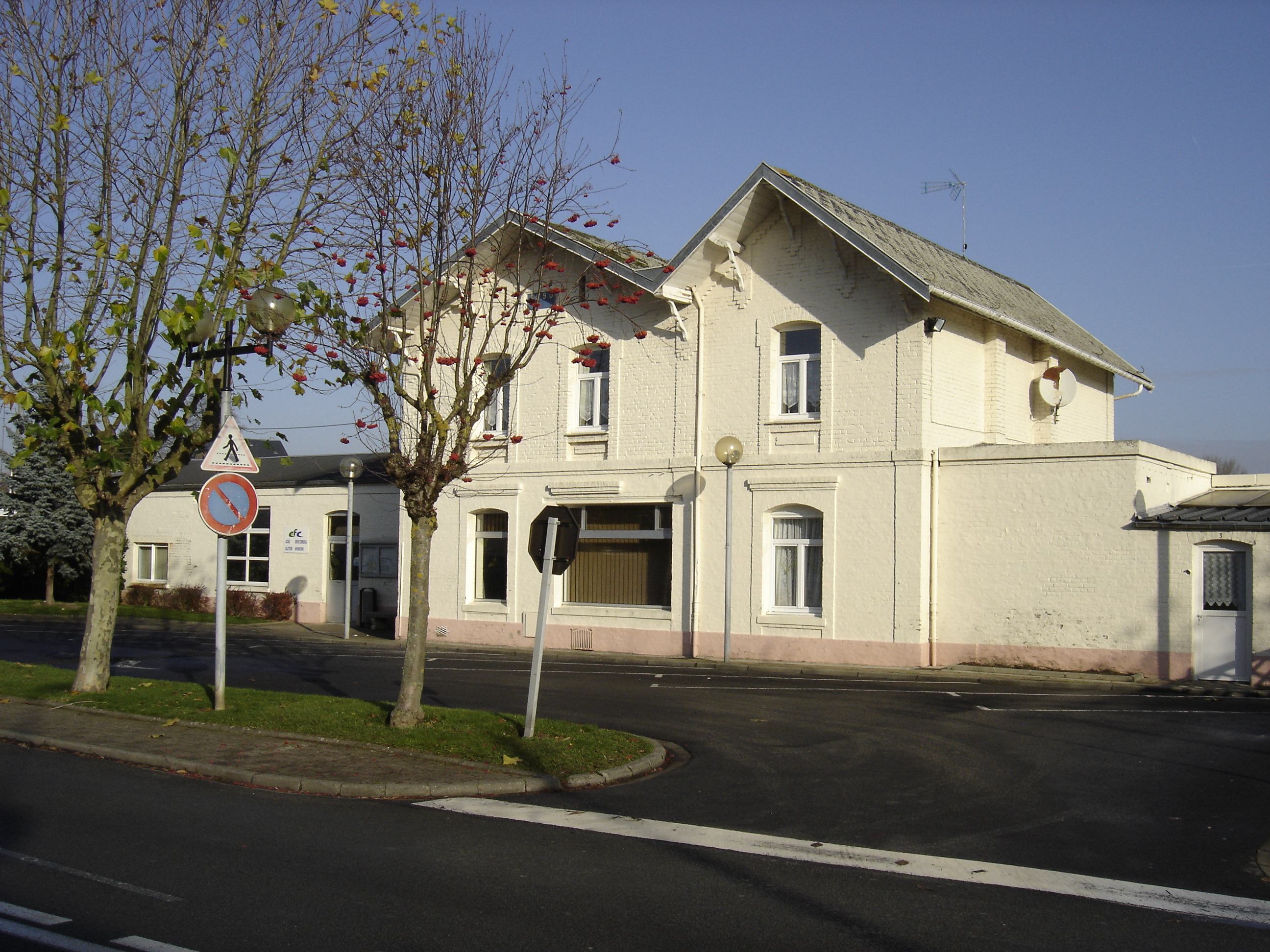
Caudry station, November 2009

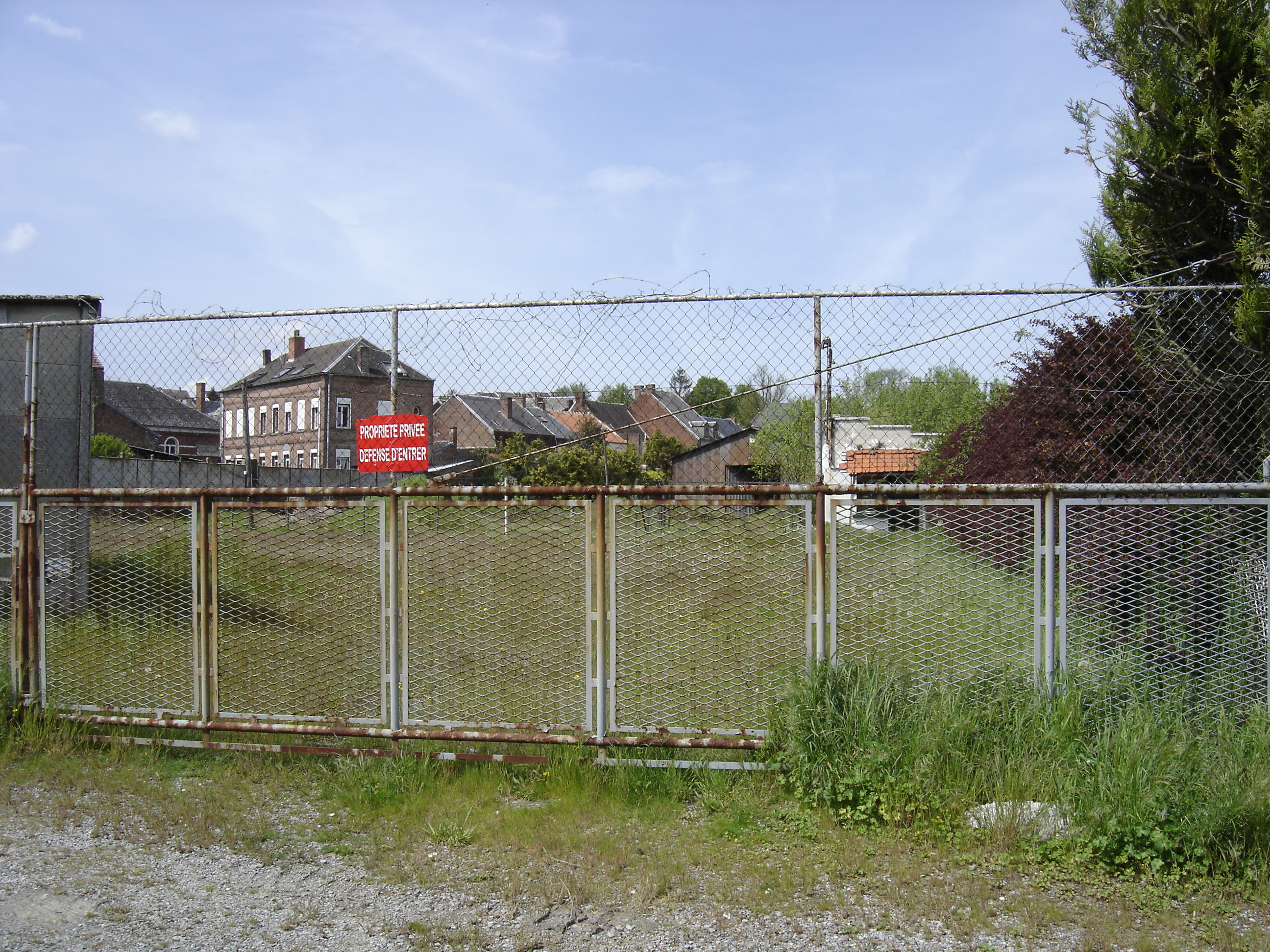
The site of Le Cateau station, May 2008

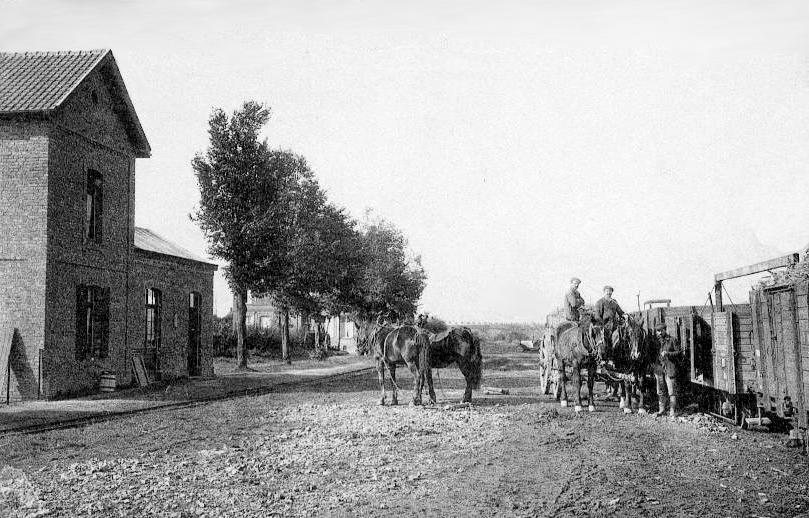
Inchy station around 1920

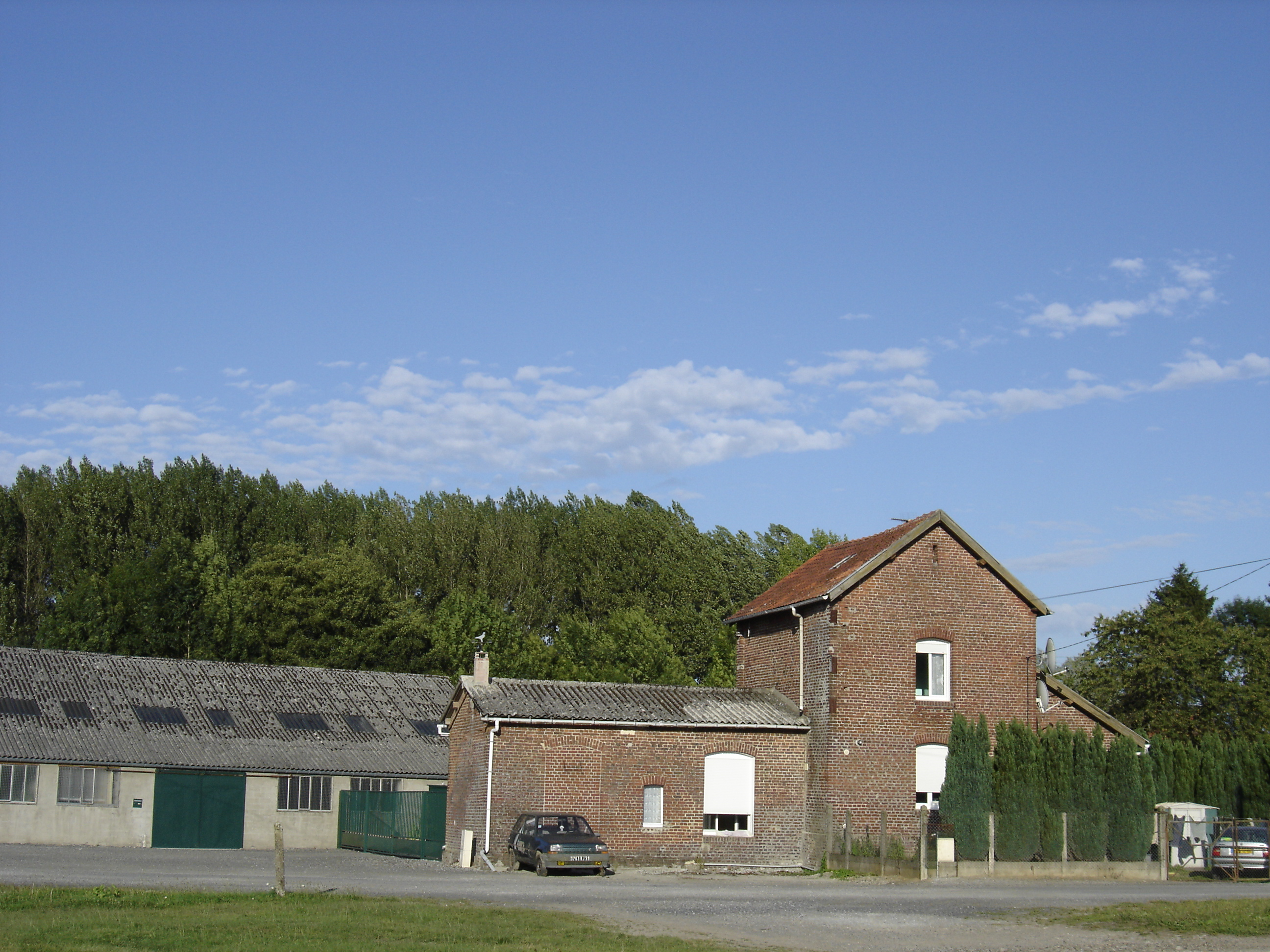
Catillon-sur-Sambre station, August 2009
