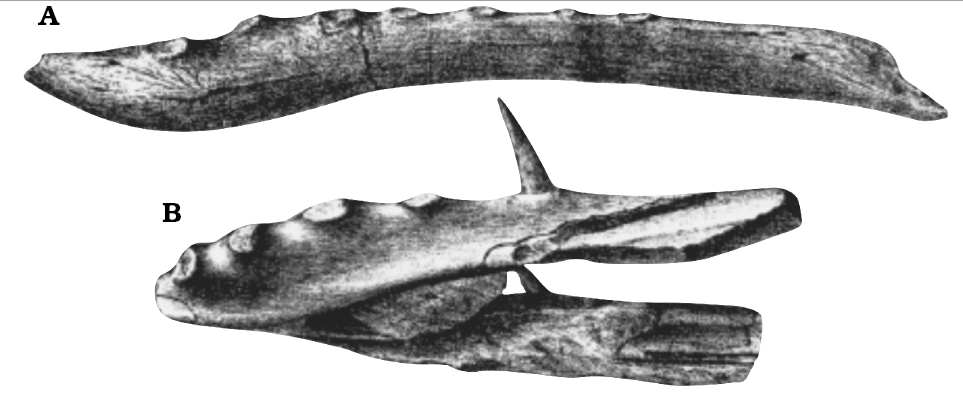
- Un-numbered holotype mandible of D. bucklandi (top) and holotype mandible GSM 113723 of D. depressirostris (bottom)
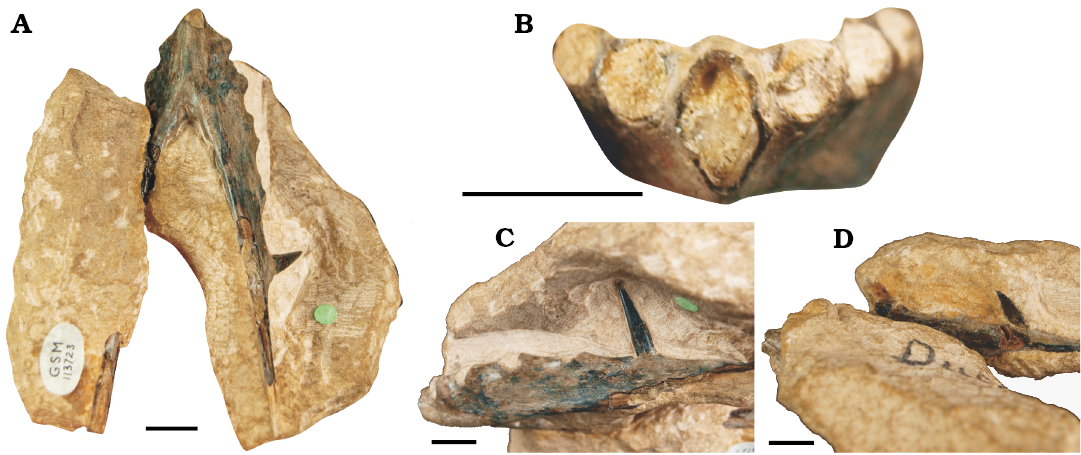
- D. depressirostris mandible GSM 113723 seen from four different angles

Scientific classification
- Kingdom: Animalia
- Phylum: Chordata
- Class: Reptilia
- Order: †Pterosauria
- Family: †Rhamphorhynchidae
- Genus: †Dolicorhamphus; Seeley, 1885

Species
- †D. bucklandii (von Meyer, 1832); †D. depressirostris (Huxley, 1859)

Synonyms
- Dolichorhamphus (sic); Pterodactylus bucklandii von Meyer, 1832; Rhamphocephalus bucklandii Lydekker, 1888; Rhamphocephalus depressirostris Lydekker, 1888; Rhamphorhynchus bucklandii Huxley, 1859; Rhamphorhynchus depressirostris Huxley, 1859

= Dolicorhamphus =

Dolicorhamphus Temporal range: Middle Jurassic, Bathonian

Extinct genus of pterosaurs

Dolicorhamphus is an extinct genus of pterosaurs from the Middle Jurassic Taynton Limestone Formation and Fuller's Earth Formations of England. The genus contains two species, D. bucklandii and D. depressirostris.

== Discovery and naming ==
D. bucklandi is based on its holotype, a now lost jaw from the Taynton Limestone Formation. It was described as a species of Pterodactylus in 1832, and the list of known specimens are: NHMUK PV R 28610, 32752, 37765, 38014, 38015, 38016, 38017, 38019, 38020, 38025, 40126, 47994, 47999a, 1028, 1029, 1030, 1824, 2637, 6749, 6750 (Steel 2012); OUM J.28275, J.28537, J.283043, which include limb elements that show no crossover with the holotype jaw. The holotype jaw measured roughly 8.89 centimetres (3.50 in) in length and was given to Thomas Henry Huxley by Henry Reynolds-Moreton.

D. depressirostris is based on its holotype, GSM 113723 (a mandible), and NHMUK PV R 40126 (isolated limb elements) and GSM 113723 has been damaged with the right ramus broken off and reattached. The teeth of D. depressirostris reached up to 15 inches (38 cm) long and the elongate jaw, thin bone walls, the dental arrangement and smooth bone texture confirmed that it was a pterosaur.

== Classification ==
Both species of Dolicorhamphus were assigned to the wastebasket genus Rhamphocephalus, considered a "rhamphorhynchoid" pterosaur. However, the type species of Rhamphocephalus, R. prestwichii, was reinterpreted as a thalattosuchian by O'Sullivan and Martill on 2018, but "R." depressirostris and "R." bucklandii were clearly pterosaurian; the former was considered to be in the Scaphognathinae while the latter was only referred to a more general Rhamphorhynchidae. Andres (2021) resurrected the genus Dolicorhamphus for the two, finding it to be a valid genus of pterosaurs closely related to Klobiodon, although he did not assign a type species. This generic assignment has since been followed by other researchers.

== Gallery ==
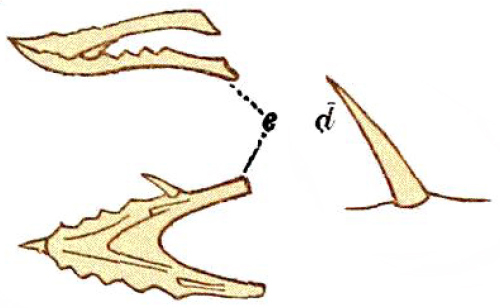
Holotype jaw and tooth of D. bucklandii; from Geikie (1902)

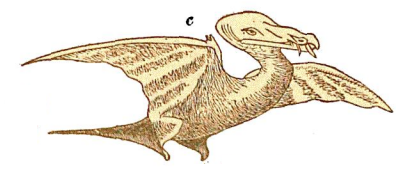
Outdated reconstruction of D. bucklandii; from Geikie (1902)
