= Irchester Narrow Gauge Railway Museum =

Railway museum in Irchester, England

Coordinates: 52.2847°N 0.6741°W

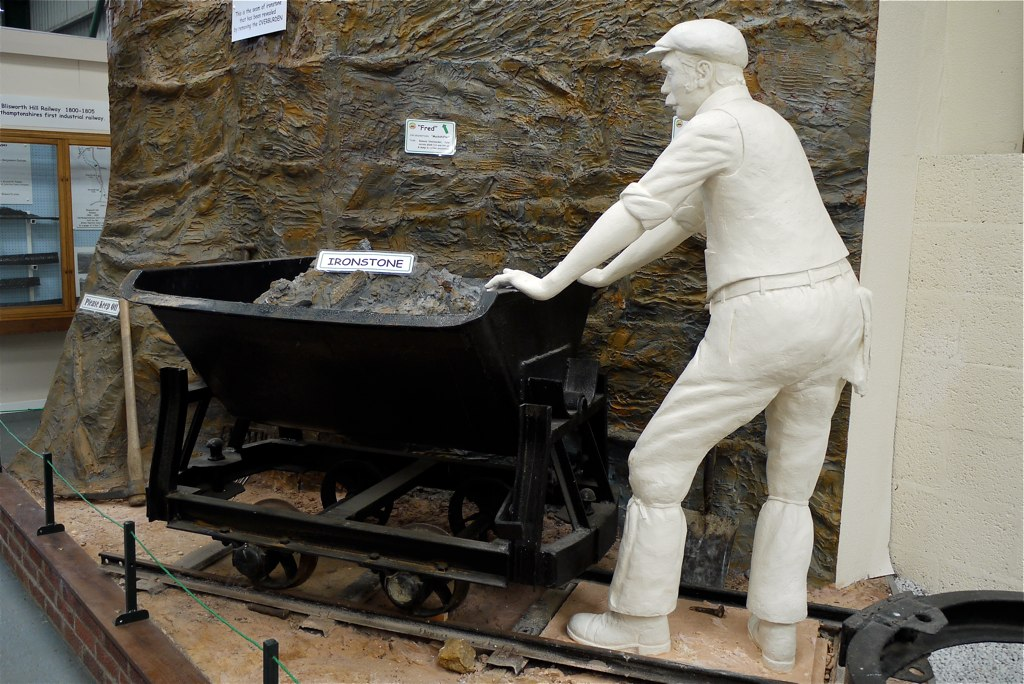
20 in (508 mm) gauge tipper truck displayed at Irchester Narrow Gauge Railway Museum, originally from Ravensthorpe Reservoir.

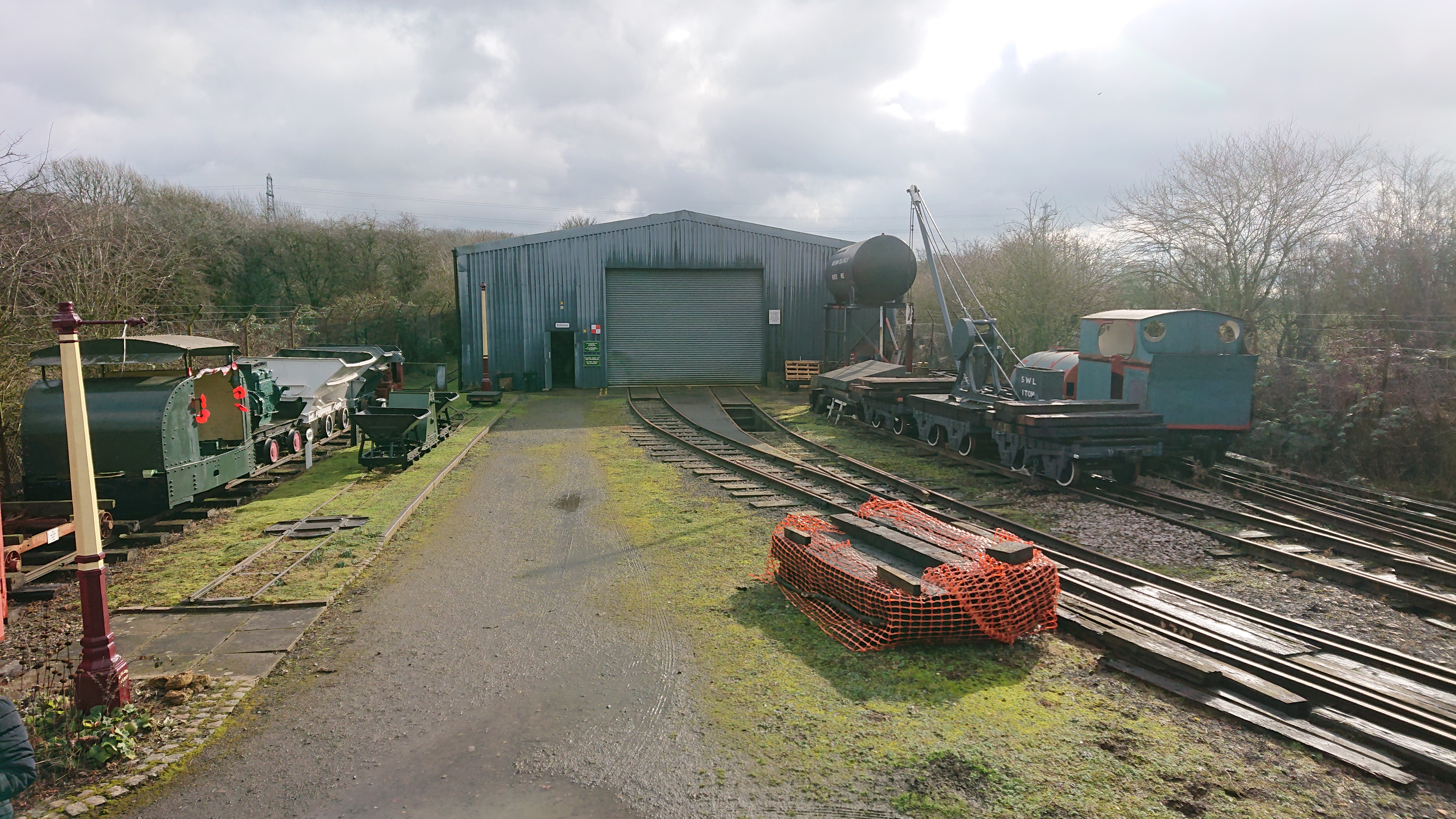
Irchester Narrow Gauge Railway Museum shed

The Irchester Narrow Gauge Railway Museum is a small railway museum and metre gauge railway near Irchester, near Wellingborough in Northamptonshire, England.

== History ==
The area around Wellingborough was rich in iron ore. A quarry opened in Irchester around 1872 to extract the iron ore, which was mainly processed in the local iron works. Ironstone continued to be mined up until closure of the quarries in 1969.

In 1971 the Northamptonshire County Council opened the Irchester Country Park, which is located on the site of the former opencast ironstone quarries. The park has a network of walks, a visitors centre and a children's play area in a grass and woodland setting. The museum was set-up within the park in 1987, inside a purpose built building to the west of the original ironstone railway maintenance yard. Access to the museum is along a footpath which follows the line of the ironstone railway trackbed. There are over 40 items of narrow gauge railway rolling stock including four steam locomotives and six diesel locomotives. A 250-metre long demonstration track with a gauge of 1,000 mm (3 ft 3 3/8 in) has been laid in the park. The original water tank has been recreated using a tank of similar design, complete with lettering matching the original.

== Locomotives ==
Identity (Name)	Other Number(s)	Previous Railway(s)	Builder	Works Number	Date Built	Wheel Arrangement	Gauge	Notes	Image
Cambrai	4	Chemin de fer du Cambrésis 1888–1936, Loddington Tramway 1936–1956, Waltham Iron Ore Tramway 1956-1960	Corpet-Louvet	493	1888	0-6-0T	1,000 mm (3 ft 3 3/8 in)	On loan from the Narrow Gauge Railway Museum - Recently re-painted into a green livery from when it worked atLoddington.	
85	1	Wellingborough Tramway	Peckett and Sons	1870	1934	0-6-0ST	1,000 mm (3 ft 3 3/8 in)	Purchased by Alan Bloom in 1966 and stored at Bressingham. Moved to the Yorkshire Dales Railway at Embsay in 1971. Sold to the Northamptonshire Locomotive Group in 1977. Restored to working order between 1982 and 1984 at Irchester Station Goods Shed and then moved to Irchester Narrow Gauge Railway Museum in 1987.	
86	2	Wellingborough Tramway	Peckett	1871	1934	0-6-0ST	1,000 mm (3 ft 3 3/8 in)	Sold in 1967 to Mr J.R. Billows, moved to Pytchley Road Industrial Estate in Kettering. Placed on loan to Northamptonshire Ironstone Railway Trust in June 1975, moved to Hunsbury Hill Northampton. Transferred to Irchester Narrow Gauge Railway Museum in 1991. Restoration completed in 2002. As of June 2026, awaiting completion of mandatory 10-year overhaul.	
87	3	Wellingborough Tramway	Peckett	2029	1942	0-6-0ST	1,000 mm (3 ft 3 3/8 in)	Sold in July 1967 to F.G. Gann & Son. Acquired in 1973 by the Northamptonshire Ironstone Railway Trust. Moved to Irchester Narrow Gauge Railway Museum in 1993, where it is a static exhibit.	
THE ROCK	9	Royal Navy Dockyards	Hunslet	2419	1941	0-4-0DM	1,000 mm (3 ft 3 3/8 in)	Originally worked at RN Dockyards Gibraltar (H.M.S.Rooke), Transferred in 1950 to RN Dockyard Singapore, Return date to England is currently unknown, but was found at A. Keefs at Brampton, Oxfordshire in 1981, Moved to Irchester Station Goods Shed on 20 February 1982. Then transferred to Irchester Narrow Gauge Railway Museum in 1987.	
MILFORD	10; ND 3645		Ruston & Hornsby	211679	1941	4wDM	1,000 mm (3 ft 3 3/8 in)		
ED 10; EDWARD CHARLES HAMPTON	11	British Railways	Ruston & Hornsby	411322	1958	4wDM	1,000 mm (3 ft 3 3/8 in)		
LR 3084	14		Motor Rail	3797	1926	4wDM	3 ft (914 mm)	Rebuild of 1918 Motor Rail locomotive, works number 1363	
12			Ruston & Hornsby	281290	1949	0-6-0DM	3 ft (914 mm)	Currently at the Weardale Railway	
5			Ruston & Hornsby	338439	1953	4wDMF	3 ft (914 mm)		
