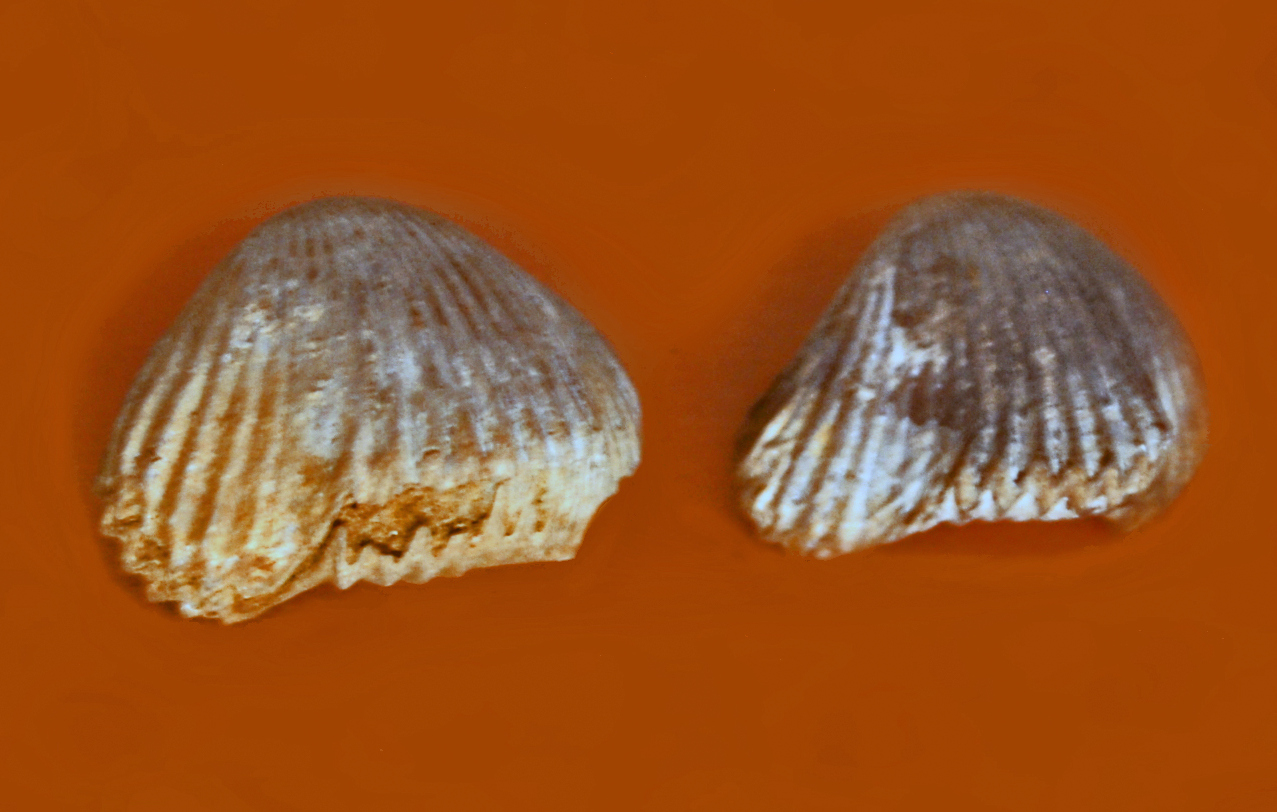
- Fossil of Kallirhynchia major from France, on display at Galerie de paléontologie et d'anatomie comparée in Paris

Scientific classification
- Kingdom: Animalia
- Phylum: Brachiopoda
- Class: Rhynchonellata
- Order: Rhynchonellida
- Family: †Wellerellidae
- Genus: †Kallirhynchia; Buckman, 1917

Species
- Kallirhynchia arabica; Kallirhynchia dispar; Kallirhynchia fornix; Kallithynchia hampenensis; Kallirhynchia morierei; Kallirhynchia obesa; Kallirhynchia orbicularis; Kallirhynchia subplicatella

= Kallirhynchia =

Kallirhynchia Temporal range: 171–161 Ma Jurassic

Extinct genus of brachiopods

Kallirhynchia is an extinct genus of brachiopods found in Jurassic strata in Europe, North Africa, the Middle East, India and Uzbekistan. It was a stationary epifaunal suspension feeder.

== Species previously assigned to Kallirhynchia ==
- Kallirhynchia sharpi = Sharpirhynchia sharpi
