= Sharp's Hill Quarry =

Quarry in Oxfordshire, England

- Site of Special Scientific Interest
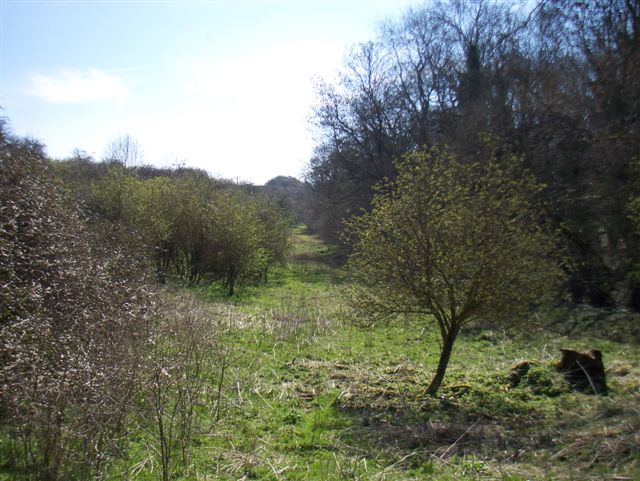
- Location of Sharp's Hill Quarry.
- Area of search: Oxfordshire
- Grid reference: SP 337 358
- Coordinates: 52.020°N 1.510°W
- Interest: Geological
- Area: 2.4 hectares (5.9 acres)
- Notification date: 1986
- Location map: Magic Map

Sharp's Hill Quarry is a 2.4-hectare (5.9-acre) former quarry and geological Site of Special Scientific Interest west of Banbury in Oxfordshire. It is a Geological Conservation Review site.

This is the type locality of the Sharp's Hill Formation. It is very fossiliferous and dates to the Bathonian stage of the Middle Jurassic, around 167 million years ago. It is described by Natural England as critical for understanding the Bathonian succession in north Oxfordshire. Strata of the underlying Chipping Norton Formation are also present.
