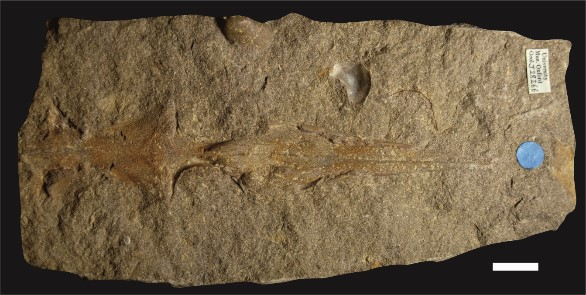
- Holotype specimen

Scientific classification
- Kingdom: Animalia
- Phylum: Chordata
- Class: Reptilia
- Clade: Archosauria
- Clade: Pseudosuchia
- Clade: Crocodylomorpha
- Suborder: †Thalattosuchia
- Genus: †Rhamphocephalus; Seeley, 1880

Type species
- †Rhamphocephalus prestwichi Seeley, 1880

= Rhamphocephalus =

Rhamphocephalus Temporal range: Middle Jurassic, Bathonian

Extinct genus of reptiles

Rhamphocephalus ("beak head") is an extinct genus of fossil reptile from the Middle Jurassic (Bathonian stage) Cotswold Slate Formation of Gloucestershire, England. The name was erected as a genus of pterosaur and became a 'wastebasket taxon' for British Jurassic pterosaur remains until a recent revision. Rhamphocephalus comprises several named species, two of which are pterosaurian, but the type species - R. prestwichi - is based on remains now identified as a thalattosuchian. Because it is poorly preserved and lacks features that distinguish it from other thalattosuchians, R. prestwichi is considered an invalid species and the genus Rhamphocephalus is a nomen dubium. Reassessments of other Rhamphocephalus species suggest they are also undiagnostic to species level, although they have properties allowing referral to some Jurassic pterosaur groups.

== Discovery and naming ==
The holotype, OUM J.28266, is a fragment from the skull roof and it was discovered by Professor Prestwich no earlier than June 1879 in the Cotswold Slate Formation at Kineton Thorns Quarry, Stow-On-Wold, Gloucestershire. Harry Seeley obtained the holotype from Prestwich and in 1880 named Rhamphocephalus prestwichi as a pterosaur, and O'Sullivan & Martill (2018) found that only OUM J.28266 was referable to R. prestwichi due to the holotype being reclassified within Thalattosuchia.

== Taxonomy ==
The type species, R. prestwichi, is known from the skull roof fragment OUM J.28266, found the Kineton Thorns Quarry, Stow-On-Wold, Gloucestershire. Seeley (1880) noted that the cranial bones of Rhamphocephalus are arranged more like that of a crocodyliform rather than a pterosaur. Although assigned to Pterosauria by previous authors, in their review of pterosaur remains from the Great Oolite group, O'Sullivan & Martill (2018) demonstrated that Rhamphocephalus belongs to Thalattosuchia rather than Pterosauria due to differences with pterosaurs in the cranial bone arrangement. They also argued that the specimen lacked good autapomorphies and the genus was a nomen dubium.

=== Formerly assigned species ===
Pterodactylus bucklandii von Meyer, 1832 and Rhamphorhynchus depressirostris Huxley, 1859, both based on jaw material, were previously assigned to Rhamphocephalus, along with the nominal species Pterodactylus aclandi, P. duncani, and P. kiddi, which are based on phalangeal remains. However, the thalattosuchian reclassification of Rhamphocephalus rendered this referral untenable, although bucklandii and depressirostris were clearly pterosaurian, and P. bucklandii was assigned to Rhamphorhychinae indeterminate, while Rhamphorhynchus depressirostris was assigned to ?Scaphognathinae indeterminate. Andres (2021) resurrects the genus name Dolicorhamphus Seeley 1875 for depressirostris and bucklandii, finding both to belong to a monophyletic genus of pterosaurs closely related to Klobiodon.
