= Sharp's Hill Formation =

Geological formation in England

- Stratigraphic range: Bathonian
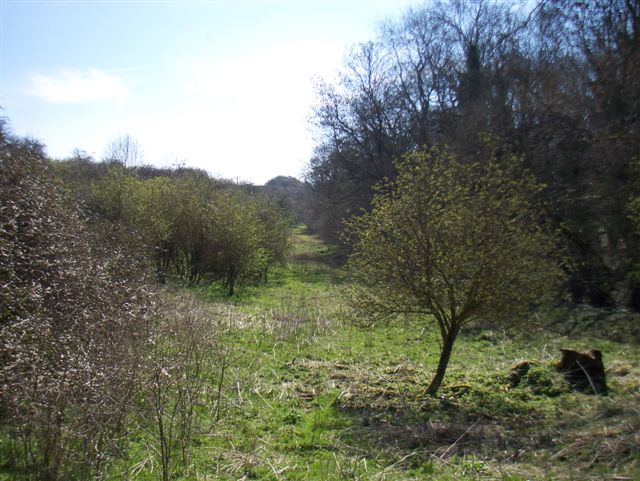
- Type locality (Sharp's Hill Quarry)
- Type: Geological formation
- Unit of: Great Oolite Group
- Underlies: Taynton Limestone Formation
- Overlies: Chipping Norton Limestone, Horsehay Sand Formation
- Thickness: up to 5 m

Lithology
- Primary: Mudstone Marl Limestone

Location
- Region: England
- Country: United Kingdom

Type section
- Named for: Sharp's Hill Quarry

The Sharp's Hill Formation is a Bathonian geologic formation in North Oxfordshire north-east of Milton-under-Wychwood and Minster Lovell in the United Kingdom, dating to around 167 million years ago. Dinosaur remains diagnostic to the genus level are among the fossils that have been recovered from the formation. It is the lateral equivalent of the Rutland Formation and the Fuller's Earth Formation.

The type locality is the Sharp's Hill Quarry.

== Paleofauna ==
- Megalosaurus bucklandii
- Cetiosaurus sp. (sauropod indet)
- "Eoplophysis" (Omosaurus) vetustus (stegosaurid indet)
- Lexovisaurus durobrivensis

== See also ==
- List of dinosaur-bearing rock formations
  - List of stratigraphic units with few dinosaur genera
