= Wellingborough Tramway =

Narrow-gauge railway in the United Kingdom

Coordinates: 52°19′08″N 0°39′24″W

Overview
- Headquarters: Wellingborough
- Locale: England
- Dates of operation: 1874–1966
- Successor: Abandoned

Technical
- Track gauge: 1,000 mm (3 ft 3 3/8 in) metre gauge
- Length: 4 miles (6.4 km)

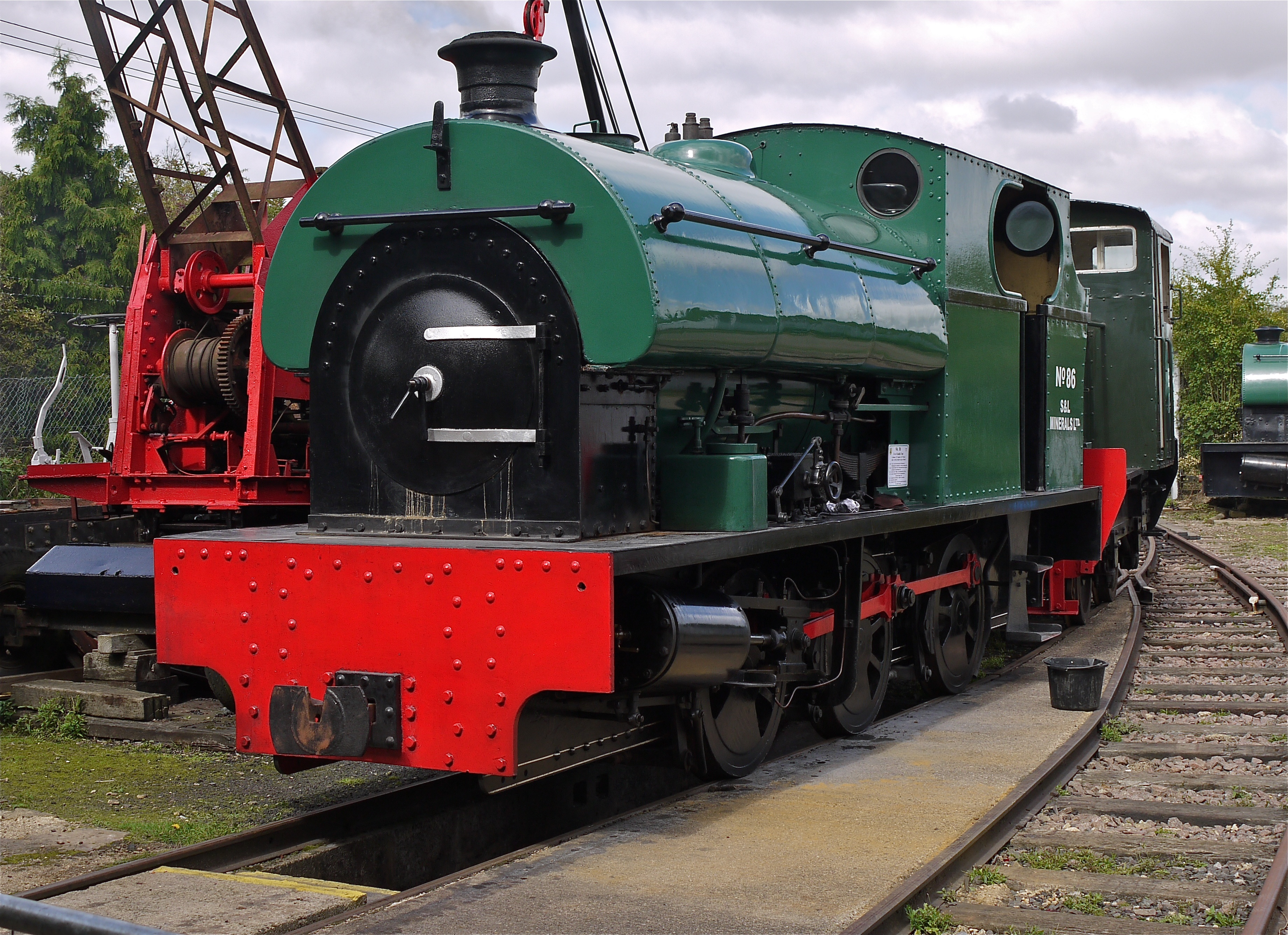
Locomotive No. 86 that ran on the Tramway until 1966, seen preserved at the Irchester Narrow Gauge Railway Museum

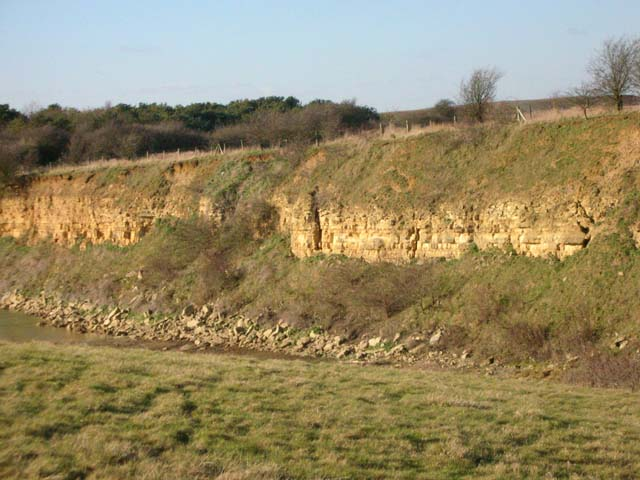
The quarry face of Glebe Quarry, seen in 2006

The Wellingborough Tramway was an industrial narrow-gauge railway that connected a series of ironstone mines and quarries with the Midland Railway and later with the ironworks on the north side of Wellingborough. In various forms, the tramway operated between 1875 and 1966.

== History ==
=== Rixon's Ironworks ===
In 1870, Wellingborough businessman James Rixon opened a brickworks on the west side of the Midland Railway line, opposite the terminus of the Finedonhill Tramway. In 1874, they expanded into iron ore quarrying, leasing land for a quarry to the south of Finedon village. They laid a 1,000 mm (3 ft 3 3/8 in) gauge horse-drawn tramway along the side of the Finedon Road (now the A510) to transport the ore to sidings just to the north of their brickworks.

By 1884 their ironstone quarrying was more successful than their brickworks, and they installed a blast furnace at the western end of the tramway in order to maximise profits from their ore. They expanded the leases of land to the south and west of Finedon, and extended their tramway to over 4 miles. 1884 also saw the purchase of two steam locomotives to operate the tramway, the second arriving in 1887.

=== Wellingborough Iron Company ===
Despite their booming iron trade, Rixon's company was declared bankrupt in 1887. A new company, the Wellingborough Iron Company, was formed in 1888 to take over Rixon's business. This new company significantly expanded the ironworks, and relaid the tramway on a new alignment, which passed under the Midland Railway line in a tunnel, and avoided running alongside the Finedon Road. Three new, larger steam locomotives were purchased and the original locomotives sold off.

Quarrying operations expanded during the 1890s and 1900s, with new land leases being taken to support quarrying. In 1911 the Thingdon Quarry immediately south of Finedon was leased from Neilson's. From 1913, a number of underground adits were driven from the quarry face eastwards to access deeper ore deposits. These eventually extended to dozens of miles of tunnels and galleries running towards Irthlingborough. These mines were served by horse-hauled 2 ft 4 in (711 mm) gauge tramways.

In 1926 the ore quarries at Sidegate Land that John Clark had been operating were taken over by the Wellingborough Iron Company, and the tramway was extended to serve them. Further underground mines were started at Glebe Quarry 1922, eventually reaching and merging with the Thingdon Mines; these too were served by a 2 ft 4 in (711 mm) gauge tramway which tipped its output into the metre gauge tramway wagons.

=== Stanton Ironworks Company ===
In late 1932, the Wellingborough Iron Company was purchased by the Stanton Ironworks and the ironworks at Wellingborough was closed down. Stanton overhauled the iron-making process, equipping a completely new and larger ironworks. The tramway was rebuilt using heavier rail that allowed larger trains to be run. To operate these trains, three new Peckett locomotives were purchased to replace the Hunslets. These new locomotives were substantially more powerful, being based on a standard gauge design.

All open-cast quarrying was abandoned, with all ore being extracted from the combined Thingdon/Glebe mines. Five new 2 ft 4 in (711 mm) gauge Ruston & Hornsby diesel locomotives were purchased to work the underground trains. These mines were expanded throughout the 1930s.

=== Stewarts and Lloyds ===
In 1939, just before the outbreak of the Second World War, Stanton Ironworks was acquired by Stewarts & Lloyds. The efficient Stanton operation continued as before, though the war saw a sharp increase in demand for iron and steel for the war effort. In 1940, Britain's first walking dragline excavator was used at Finedon Top Lodge Quarry which made deeper opencast quarrying viable. the underground mines were abandoned in 1947 and ore extraction concentrated on the opencast pits.

Demand for Finedon ore began to drop from the late 1950s. Stewarts and Lloyds began supplying ore to the Wellingborough ironworks from their extensive quarries at Corby, and the output of the Finedon pits was transferred from the metre gauge tramway to standard gauge wagons and taken to the steelworks at Irlam. By 1962 only one pit near Finedon was still in use. The Wellingborough Ironworks closed down at the end of 1962. Ore continued to be quarried near Finedon until 1966, when the final pit and the tramway were closed. It was the last industrial narrow gauge railway operating in The Midlands ironstone industry.

== Locomotives ==
Number	Gauge	Builder	Works number	Wheel arrangement (Whyte)	Date built	Date disposed	Disposal	Notes
1	1,000 mm (3 ft 3 3/8 in)	Hunslet Engine Company	384	0-4-0ST	1884		Regauged to 3 ft 6 in (1,067 mm) and sold to contractor T. Oliver	
2	1,000 mm (3 ft 3 3/8 in)	Hunslet Engine Company	405	0-4-0ST	1887		Regauged to 3 ft 6 in (1,067 mm) and sold to contractor T. Oliver, then to the Lagos Government Railway, in Nigeria. Scrapped 1907	
4	1,000 mm (3 ft 3 3/8 in)	Hunslet Engine Company	437	0-4-0ST	1888	1959	Scrapped	Supplied to the Wellingborough Iron Company. Used as a standby after 1933.
1	1,000 mm (3 ft 3 3/8 in)	Hunslet Engine Company	562	0-4-0ST	1892	1933	Scrapped	Supplied to the Wellingborough Iron Company, replacing the original Number 1
3	1,000 mm (3 ft 3 3/8 in)	Hunslet Engine Company	603	0-4-0ST	1894	1933	Scrapped	Supplied to the Wellingborough Iron Company
10	1,000 mm (3 ft 3 3/8 in)	W.G. Bagnall	1942	0-4-0ST	1918	1933	Scrapped	Supplied to the Wellingborough Iron Company
85	1,000 mm (3 ft 3 3/8 in)	Peckett and Sons	1870	0-6-0ST	1934	1966	Purchased by Alan Bloom in 1966 and stored at Bressingham Steam and Gardens. Moved to the Yorkshire Dales Railway at Embsay in 1971. Sold to the Northamptonshire Locomotive Group in 1977. Restored to working order between 1982 and 1984 at Irchester Station Goods Shed and then moved to Irchester Narrow Gauge Railway Museum in 1987.	Supplied to the Stanton Ironworks
86	1,000 mm (3 ft 3 3/8 in)	Peckett and Sons	1871	0-6-0ST	1934	1967	Sold in 1967 to Mr J.R. Billows, moved to Pytchley Road Industrial Estate in Kettering. Placed on loan to Northamptonshire Ironstone Railway Trust in June 1975, moved to Hunsbury Hill Northampton. Transferred to Irchester Narrow Gauge Railway Museum in 1991. Restoration completed in 2002. As of 2019 awaiting completion of mandatory 10-year overhaul.	Supplied to the Stanton Ironworks
87	1,000 mm (3 ft 3 3/8 in)	Peckett and Sons	2029	0-6-0ST	1942	July 1967	Sold in July 1967 to F.G. Gann & Son. Acquired in 1973 by the Northamptonshire Ironstone Railway Trust. Moved to Irchester Narrow Gauge Railway Museum in 1993, where it is a static exhibit.	Supplied to Stewarts and Lloyds. A larger machine than the 1934 Peckett design. Based on the standard gauge Special R4 design.
1	2 ft 4 in (711 mm)	Ruston and Hornsby	168831	4wDM	1923		Sold to Wreake Sand and Gravel Company, Asfordby	16HP class, acquired secondhand from Holwell Iron Mines in 1934
2	2 ft 4 in (711 mm)	Ruston and Hornsby	172888	4wDM	1934		Sold to Nuthall sandpits, Northamptonshire	22/28HP class, acquired new
3	2 ft 4 in (711 mm)	Ruston and Hornsby	174140	4wDM	1935	1947	Sold to South Witham Quarries	27/32HP class, acquired new
4	2 ft 4 in (711 mm)	Ruston and Hornsby	177608	4wDM	1936		Converted to a stationary compressor	27/32HP class, acquired new
5	2 ft 4 in (711 mm)	Ruston and Hornsby	200494	4wDM	1940	1947	Sold to Brown & Shaw, Wirksworth, Derbyshire	25/30HP class, acquired new
