= Neilson's Tramway =

Coordinates: 52.3260°N 0.6644°W

Overview
- Headquarters: Finedon
- Locale: England
- Dates of operation: 1881–1929
- Successor: Abandoned

Technical
- Track gauge: 2 ft 4 in (711 mm)
- Length: 1 mile

Neilson's Tramway was a British industrial narrow-gauge railway which operated from 1881 to 1929.

== History ==
Walter Neilson was a farmer who owned land on the south west edge of Finedon, Northants, England. The land around Finedon has many rich, shallow ironstone deposits, and commercial extraction of iron ore began in the 1860s and was a booming industry by the 1870s. In 1879, Neilson began quarrying for ironstone on his land. By 1881, he was producing enough ore to justify laying a narrow gauge tramway from his land down to sidings on the Midland Railway about a mile north of Wellingborough railway station. These sidings became known as "Neilson's Sidings" and were still known by this name into the 1990s.

Neilson's Tramway was laid to 2 ft 4 in (711 mm) gauge and the lower section was a double-track incline powered by a stationary steam engine located at the bottom of the incline. The upper section of the tramway was horse-hauled into the quarries.

Neilson's first quarry was exhausted by 1892, and he leased land on the east side of the Finedon Road (now the A510) at Thingdon, immediately south of Finedon. "Thingdon" is an earlier version of the name "Finedon". This required an extension to his tramway, that passed under the Finedon Road. By 1911, all the ore that could be extracted using opencast quarrying had been found. The ore deposit dipped beneath Neville's Lodge and required mining to access. Neilson was not prepared to undertake the more technically difficult mining process. Instead he sold his company to the Wellingborough Iron Company who opened up the Thingdon Mines to access the ore.

Neilson's Tramway continued in occasional use under the ownership of the Wellingborough Iron Company until 1929. The track was not taken up until 1933.
