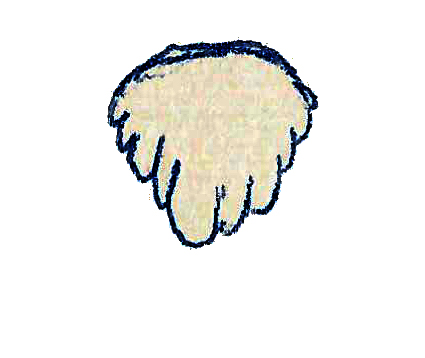
- Specimen IPFUB P X 1, the holotype tooth of A. kuehnei

Scientific classification
- Kingdom: Animalia
- Phylum: Chordata
- Class: Reptilia
- Clade: Dinosauria
- Clade: †Ornithischia
- Genus: †Alocodon; Thulborn, 1973
- Species: †A. kuehnei

Binomial name
- †Alocodon kuehnei Thulborn, 1973

= Alocodon =

Alocodon Temporal range: Late Jurassic, Oxfordian

Extinct genus of dinosaurs

Alocodon is a genus of ornithischian dinosaur known from multiple teeth from the Middle or Late Jurassic Cabaços Formation of Portugal, and also the Forest Marble and Chipping Norton Formations of England. A single species is known, A. kuehnei.

== Discovery and naming ==
The taxon was first described in 1973 by Richard A. Thulborn for an assemblage of teeth from the Pedrógão locality of Portugal, distinguished by an enlarged central denticle on the teeth, with the name taken from the Greek alox and odon meaning 'furrow tooth'. The type specimen, a single tooth, is stored in the Museu Geológico do Instituto Geológico e Mineiro in Lisbon, Portugal, formerly having been kept in the collections of the Free University of Berlin as IPFUB P X 1, and comes from an individual under 2 m (6.6 ft) in length. Though it was originally described as having been found in an unnamed deposit in the Portuguese Leiria District of upper Callovian age, it was identified as having come from the lower Oxfordian Cabaços Formation. Alongside the 158 isolated teeth from Portugal assigned to Alocodon, some isolated teeth from the Bathonian Forest Marble and Chipping Norton Formations of England have been assigned to as cf. Alocodon sp. based on similarity.

== Classification ==
Alocodon was originally referred to as a member of the ornithopod family Fabrosauridae by Thulborn in 1973, closest to Fabrosaurus but also related to Echinodon and Trimucrodon. Peter M. Galton retained it in the family in 1978, though he noted that there were significant differences between Alocodon and Fabrosaurus, and the Middle to Late Jurassic fabrosaurids Alocodon, Trimucrodon and Echinodon were representative of three independent branches of the family, with Nanosaurus not preserving enough material to determine its relationships. Galton then suggested in 1983 that Alocodon was related to Othnielia, based on similarities of the teeth, placed within the ornithopod family Hypsilophodontidae. Given that the species was only represented by teeth, Alocodon was designated as a nomen dubium in 1990 by David B. Weishampel and Lawrence M. Witmer, as an indeterminate member of Ornithischia outside Ornithopoda. While a basal ornithischian position outside Ornithopoda was retained by Paul Sereno in 1991, it was considered a possibly valid taxon based on its broad central denticle.

José Ruiz-Omeñaca reclassified Alocodon in 1999, based on a reconsideration of features and classifications specified previously. Though it had similarities to ornithopod, Ruiz-Omeñaca instead placed it within Thyreophora as an intermediate taxon, as the tooth crown was asymmetrical, with the cingulum on one side higher than the other, and no ridges present on the crown. Weishampel, Witmer and colleague David B. Norman followed their 1990 opinion on Alocodon in 2004, though they noted that further study could potentially support the validity of the taxon. Features of the teeth identified by José I. Canudo and colleagues in 2004 instead supported a more specific position for Alocodon, as a member of Ankylosauria. Canudo et al. based this assignment on the anatomy of the denticles and cingulum of the crown. A denticulate cingulum present in Alocodon was also identified as an ankylosaur feature, by Paul M. Barrett and colleagues in 2010, though more material was considered necessary to verify the importance of the feature. Alocodon was considered an ornithopod by Filippo M. Rotatori and colleagues in 2020. Because of its incomplete nature, Alocodon has been excluded from phylogenetic analyses. Most recently, a comprehensive analysis of early ornithischian evolution found Alocodon to exhibit traits representative of Parapredentata, but could not narrow down its classification further.

== Paleoecology ==
A diversity of fauna is known from the Praia de Pedrógão locality alongside Alocodon, including the pterosaur Rhamphorhynchus, fragments of the shell of a turtle, remains of Goniopholis and another intermediate crocodilian, material from a kuehneosaurid and another unnamed lizard, an unnamed salamander, and teeth from the teleost fishes Caturus, Lepidotes and Proscinetes, and two hybodontid sharks: Asteracanthus and an unnamed small form. Footprints and teeth of a very large theropod also indicate their presence in the locality.
