= Hampen Formation =

Geological formation in England

- Stratigraphic range: Bathonian
- Type: Geological formation
- Unit of: Great Oolite Group
- Underlies: White Limestone Formation
- Overlies: Taynton Limestone Formation, Fuller's Earth Formation
- Thickness: 4-11 m

Lithology
- Primary: Limestone
- Other: Marl

Location
- Region: Oxfordshire
- Country: England

The Hampen Formation is a Jurassic geological formation of Bathonian age found in central Southern England. Dinosaur remains diagnostic to the genus level are among the fossils that have been recovered from the formation. This formation was formerly known as the Hamden Marly Formation or the Hamden Marly Beds.

== Paleofauna ==
Cetiosaurus sp (sauropod indet)

== See also ==
- List of dinosaur-bearing rock formations
  - List of stratigraphic units with few dinosaur genera
