= Blisworth Limestone Formation =

Geological formation in England

Coordinates: 52°10′16″N 0°57′14″W

- Stratigraphic range: Bathonian
- Type: Geological formation
- Unit of: Great Oolite Group
- Underlies: Blisworth Clay Formation
- Overlies: Rutland Formation
- Thickness: up to 12 metres (40 ft)

Lithology
- Primary: Limestone
- Other: Marl, Mudstone

Location
- Region: Europe
- Country: United Kingdom
- Extent: Northamptonshire, Lincolnshire

Type section
- Named for: Blisworth
- Location: Blisworth Rectory Farm Quarry
- Thickness at type section: 6-7 m

The Blisworth Limestone Formation is a geological formation primarily consisting of limestone deposited during the Bathonian stage of the Middle Jurassic, found in the Jurassic ridge which extends north and south through England. It was laid down in the shallows of the Jurassic sea and is part of the more widely defined Great Oolite Group. It was previously known as the Great Oolite Limestone, White Limestone and the Snitterby Limestone Formation. It is the lateral equivalent of the White Limestone Formation From the Jurassic ridge it extends eastwards below the later deposits and in the North Sea terminology, it is part of the West Sole Group. (Cameron p. 74)

== Formation ==
The Blisworth limestone lies above the Upper Estuarine Series of strata. The latter was formed close to the coast where rivers flowed from the London-Brabant Island. The land sank a little in relation to the sea so the site lay a little further offshore. In the hot, shallow sea, the water partially evaporated so that the dissolved calcium carbonate (CaCO_{3}) was precipitated onto minute nuclei to form tiny spheres which together resemble hard fish roe. This is composed of eggs; hence the name oölite. The process goes on today in the seas off the Bahamas (Kirkaldy p. 59). Much of it also contains marine shells, notably of oyster. Subsequently, the site was submerged less deeply so that the overlying Blisworth Clay was deposited in brackish conditions. (Gallois p. 20)

The stratum is known as Blisworth Limestone because it was first studied at Blisworth in Northamptonshire when the Blisworth tunnel was being dug for what is now called the Grand Union Canal. The tunnel finally opened in 1805.

== Occurrence ==
Blisworth limestone is a generally thin but widely spread deposit in eastern England. It becomes thicker as one progresses southward from north Lincolnshire or westward from Norfolk. In the King's Lynn district, it is a shelly oolitic limestone 1 to 2 m thick. At Wiggenhall it is around 190m below mean sea level (OD) and at Tydd St Mary, around 140m. (Gallois) At Bourne, Lincolnshire, at the eastern edge of the Jurassic ridge, it is around 15m below OD. (BGS sheet 144) It is exposed at the surface around the valleys of the East and West Glen rivers (River Glen, Lincolnshire) in which vicinity it is 2.4 to 4.8 metres thick. (BGS sheet 143). Its exposure continues southward in a similar relationship to the Jurassic ridge, to the west of Peterborough. (BGS sheet 157) Around Towcester it reaches a thickness of 9m. (Hains & Horton p. 85)

== Application ==
Blisworth limestone is used as a building material, in particular as blocks of stone. Lilford Hall in Northamptonshire is made from Blisworth limestone.

== See also ==
- List of types of limestone
