= Corsham Limestone Formation =

Geological formation in England

Coordinates: 51°25′28″N 2°11′59″W

- Stratigraphic range: Bathonian
- Type: Geological formation
- Unit of: Great Oolite Group
- Underlies: Forest Marble Formation
- Overlies: Chalfield Oolite Formation, Athelstan Oolite Formation
- Area: Cotswolds
- Thickness: up to 9 metres (30 ft)

Lithology
- Primary: Limestone

Location
- Region: Europe
- Country: England
- Extent: Gloucestershire, Somerset

Type section
- Named for: Corsham
- Location: Corsham railway cutting
- Thickness at type section: 6.2-6.7 m

The Corsham Limestone Formation is a geological formation in England. It is part of the Great Oolite Group and was deposited in the Bathonian stage of the Middle Jurassic. It is found in the central to southern regions of the Cotswolds.
