= Hook Norton Cutting and Banks =

Site of Special Scientific Interest in Oxfordshire

Coordinates: 51.982°N 1.480°W

- Site of Special Scientific Interest
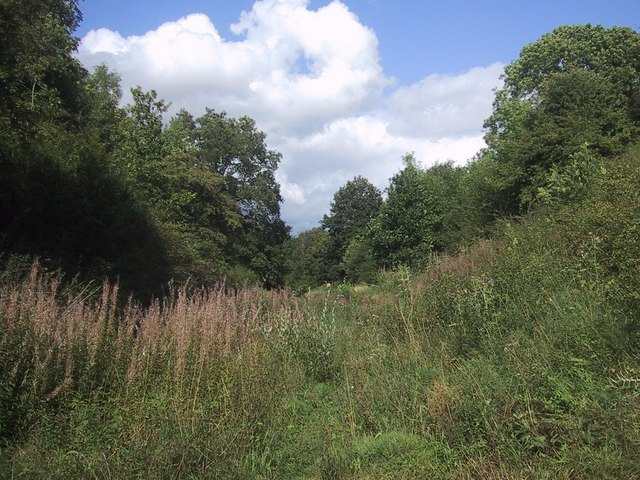
- Location of Hook Norton Cutting and Banks.
- Area of search: Oxfordshire
- Grid reference: SP 358 316
- Interest: Biological; Geological
- Area: 6.7 hectares (17 acres)
- Notification date: 1986
- Location map: Magic Map

Hook Norton Cutting and Banks is a 6.7-hectare (17-acre) biological and geological Site of Special Scientific Interest south of Hook Norton in Oxfordshire. The site is in three areas, two of which are managed as a nature reserve called Hook Norton Cutting by Berkshire, Buckinghamshire and Oxfordshire Wildlife Trust. and are designated a Geological Conservation Review site.

Hook Norton Cutting is a nature reserve along two stretches of a disused railway line separated by a tunnel. Most of it is unimproved calcareous grassland with a rich variety of flora. The site is notable for its bee species, including one which has only been recorded at three other sites in the country, Andrena bucephala. The cutting exposes rocks dating to the Middle Jurassic, around 167 million years ago, which are the type section of the Hook Norton Member of the Chipping Norton Formation. Hook Norton Bank is a steeply sloping limestone grassland by the River Swere.
