= Fuller's Earth Formation =

Geological formation that outcrops in southern England

- Stratigraphic range: Bathonian
- Type: Formation
- Unit of: Great Oolite Group
- Sub-units: Eyford Member
- Underlies: Frome Clay, Chalfield Oolite Formation, Athelstan Oolite Formation, Taynton Limestone Formation or Tresham Rock Formation
- Overlies: Chipping Norton Limestone or Inferior Oolite Group
- Thickness: 5 m to >260 m

Lithology
- Primary: Mudstone
- Other: Limestone, Sandstone

Location
- Region: England
- Country: United Kingdom

The Fullers Earth Formation is a geological formation that outcrops in southern England. It is also mostly present in the subsurface of the Wessex Basin and offshore in the English Channel Basin, Celtic Sea Basin and St George's Channel Basin. It preserves fossils dating back to the Bathonian stage of the Middle Jurassic series such as the pterosaur Dolicorhamphus. It is the lateral equivalent of the Rutland Formation, Sharp's Hill Formation, Calcaire d'Ecouché, and Calcaire de Caen

== See also ==
- List of fossiliferous stratigraphic units in England
