= Blisworth Rectory Farm Quarry =

Quarry in Northamptonshire, England

Coordinates: 52.171°N 0.954°W

- Site of Special Scientific Interest
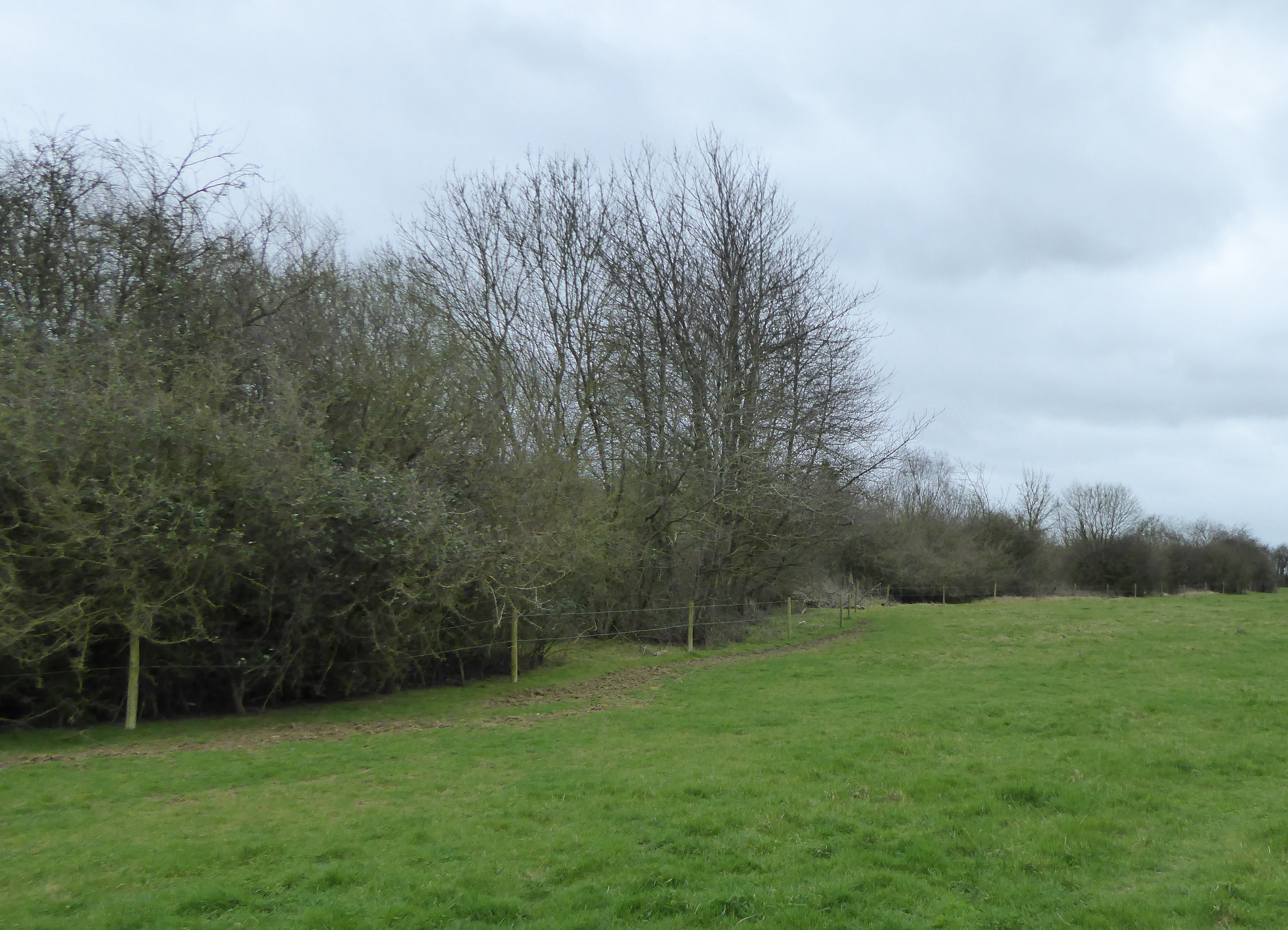
- Location of Blisworth Rectory Farm Quarry.
- Area of search: Northamptonshire
- Grid reference: SP 716 530
- Interest: Geological
- Area: 1.0 hectares
- Notification date: 1986
- Location map: Magic Map

Blisworth Rectory Farm Quarry is a 1.0-hectare (2.5-acre) geological Site of Special Scientific Interest west of Blisworth in Northamptonshire. It is a Geological Conservation Review site.

This site exposes White Limestone dating to the Middle Jurassic Bathonian stage, around 165 million years ago. Common fossils are brachiopods, corals and gastropods, and there are also nautiloids and vertebrate teeth.

The site is on private land with no public access.
