= Hornsleasow Quarry =

Site of Special Scientific Interest in Gloucestershire

- Site of Special Scientific Interest
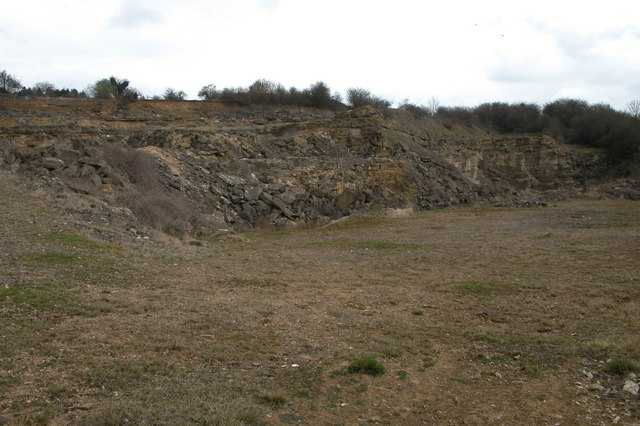
- Location of Hornsleasow Quarry.
- Area of search: Gloucestershire
- Grid reference: SP131322
- Coordinates: 51.98855°N 1.809915°W
- Interest: Geological
- Area: 3.5 ha (8.6 acres)
- Notification date: 1974

Hornsleasow Quarry (grid reference SP131322) is a 3.5-hectare (8.6-acre) geological Site of Special Scientific Interest in Gloucestershire, notified in 1974. The site is listed in the 'Cotswold District' Local Plan 2001-2011 (on line) as a Regionally Important Geological Site (RIGS).

== Location and geology ==
The quarry (Snowshill Hill) lies in the Cotswold Area of Outstanding Natural Beauty and exposes a relatively thick sequence of Bathonian (Middle Jurassic) oolitic limestones, and thin clays of significant importance in correlating similar sequences in north Gloucestershire. The rocks, which belong to the Clypeus Grit, Chipping Norton Formation, Sharps Hill Formation and the Taynton Limestone Formation, are considered to have been laid down c. 170 million years ago. This would have been in a warm, shallow sea which covered much of the Gloucestershire and Oxfordshire areas. The conditions then would have been similar to those in the present day Bahama Banks in the Caribbean.

Evidence for the dating is provided by the sedimentary structures and the type of fossils found within the rocks which are well preserved. Hornsleasow Quarry is important, therefore, for the reconstruction of an ancient sea.

== SSSI Source ==
- Natural England SSSI information on the citation
- Natural England SSSI information on the Hornsleasow Quarry unit
