= Taynton Limestone Formation =

Geological formation in England

Taynton Limestone
- Stratigraphic range: Bathonian
- Type: Geological formation
- Unit of: Great Oolite Group
- Underlies: Hampen Formation, Rutland Formation
- Overlies: Fuller's Earth Formation, Sharp's Hill Formation, Horsehay Sand Formation
- Thickness: 0-11 m

Lithology
- Primary: Limestone
- Other: Marl, Sandstone

Location
- Region: Oxfordshire
- Country: England

Type section
- Named for: Taynton, Oxfordshire
- Location: Lee's Quarry, Taynton Down, Oxfordshire

The Taynton Limestone is a geological formation in Oxfordshire in the United Kingdom. It dates to the Middle Jurassic, mid-Bathonian stage. It predominantly consists of ooidal grainstone. The term "Stonesfield Slate" refers to slaty limestone horizons within the formation that during the 18th and 19th centuries were extensively quarried for use in roof tiling within the vicinity of Stonesfield, Oxfordshire. Previously these were thought to belong to the Sharp's Hill Formation, but boreholes and shaft sections suggest that at least three horizons within the Taynton Limestone were quarried for the slate. These horizons are well known for producing a diverse set of fossils including those of plants, insects as well as vertebrates, including some of the earliest known mammals, pterosaurs as well as those of first dinosaur ever described, Megalosaurus.

== Vertebrate fauna ==
=== Sauropsids ===
| Color key: Taxon / Reclassified taxon / Taxon falsely reported as present / Dubious taxon or junior synonym / Ichnotaxon / Ootaxon / Morphotaxon | Notes; Uncertain or tentative taxa are in small text; ~~crossed out~~ taxa are discredited. |

Sauropsids of the Stonesfield Slate
| Taxa | Species | Material | Location | Notes | Images |
|---|---|---|---|---|---|
| Iliosuchus | I. incognitus | Two ilia | | A theropod dinosaur. Not distingusiable from Megalosaurus | |
| Megalosaurus | M. bucklandii | Isolated remains including several dentaries, maxillas and postcranial bones from multiple individuals | | A megalosaurid theropod dinosaur, also present in the Chipping Norton and Sharp's Hill Formations | |
| Klobiodon | K. rochei | Partial dentary with teeth | | A rhamphorhynchid pterosaur | |
| Protochelys | P. blakii | Isolated epidermal scales, coracoid, plastron fragment | | Nomen dubium, Testudinata indet | |
| Teleosaurus | T. geoffroyi | | | An indeterminate Teleosaurid. Probably the same animal as Teleosaurus cadomensis. | |
| Monofenestrata | Indeterminate | Vertebrae | | | |
| Rhamphorhynchidae | Indeterminate | Various isolated remains | | | |

=== Mammaliamorphs ===
Mammaliamorphs of the Stonesfield Slate
| Taxa | Species | Material | Location | Notes | Images |
|---|---|---|---|---|---|
| Amphilestes | A. broderipii | Two left mandibles and right mandible | Stonesfield Slate quarries | Amphilestid | |
| Amphitherium | A. prevostii | Partial left mandible and a right mandible | Stonesfield Slate quarries | Amphitheriidae | |
| Amphitherium | A. rixoni | Right dentary | Stonesfield Slate quarries | Amphitheriidae | |
| Stereognathus | S. ooliticus | Teeth | Stonesfield Slate quarries | Tritylodontid | |
| Phascolotherium | P. bucklandii | Right mandible and left ramus | Stonesfield Slate quarries | Amphilestid | |

=== Fish ===
Fish of the Stonesfield Slate
| Taxa | Species | Material | Location | Notes | Images |
|---|---|---|---|---|---|
| Breviacanthus | Breviacanthus brevis | | Stonesfield Slate quarries | | |
| Ganodus | Spp. | | Stonesfield Slate quarries | Chimaeriformes | |
| Ischyodus | Ischyodus emarginatus | | Stonesfield Slate quarries | Chimaeriformes | |
| Aspidorhynchus | Aspidorhynchus crassus | | Stonesfield Slate quarries | | |
| Pholidophorus | Indeterminate | | Stonesfield Slate quarries | | |
| Leptolepis | Leptolepis disjectus | | Stonesfield Slate quarries | | |
| Pycnodus | Indeterminate | | Stonesfield Slate quarries | | |
| Mesodon | Mesodon tenuidens | | Stonesfield Slate quarries | | |
| Microdon | Microdon biserialis | | Stonesfield Slate quarries | | |
| Lepidotus | Lepidotus tuberculatus | | Stonesfield Slate quarries | | |
| Macrosemius | Macrosemius sp. | | Stonesfield Slate quarries | | |
| Undina | Undina ? barroviensis | | Stonesfield Slate quarries | A coelacanth | |
| Ferganoceratodus | Ferganoceratodus phillipsi | | Stonesfield Slate quarries | A lungfish | |
| Egertonodus | Egertonodus duffini | | Stonesfield Slate quarries | A hybodont shark | |
| Palaeocarcharias? | Indeterminate | | | Possibly the oldest lamniform shark | |

== Invertebrate fauna ==
Invertebrates of the Stonesfield Slate
| Taxa | Species | Presence | Material | Notes | Images |
|---|---|---|---|---|---|
| Blapsium | B. egertoni | Stonesfield Slate | NHM, In. 34379, a ventral compression missing the head | An ommatine beetle | |
| Palaeontina | P. oolitica | Stonesfield Slate | Forewing | Type species of Palaeontinidae | |
| Pheugothemis | P. westwoodi | Stonesfield Slate | | Damsel-dragonfly of uncertain placement, while historically described as a member of Gomphidae, Huang et al. 2019 state that it "can[not] be accurately attributed to the Gomphidae, or even the Gomphida." | |

== Flora ==
The flora known from the Stonesfield Slate comprises a relatively diverse flora, with 25 morphospecies present. It primarily represents a coastal environment, perhaps seasonally dry with mangrove like environments. It is a noticeably different assemblage than the Yorkshire floras of equivalent age, possibly because the latter is thought to represent a deltaic, wetland environment.

Flora of the Stonesfield Slate
| Taxa | Species | Material | Location | Notes | Images |
|---|---|---|---|---|---|
| cf. Dictyophyllum | Indeterminate | | | Fern, Member of Dipteridaceae | |
| Phlebopteris | P. woodwardii | | | Fern, Member of Matoniaceae | |
| cf. Coniopteris | Indeterminate | | | Fern, Member of Dicksoniaceae | |
| Sagenopteris | S. colpodes | | | Member of Caytoniales | |
| Ctenozamites | cf. leckenbyi | | | Member of Peltaspermales | |
| Pachypteris | P. macrophylla | | | A "Pteridosperm", likely either a member of Peltaspermales or Corystospermales | |
| Komlopteris | K. speciosa | | | Member of Corystospermales | |
| Ctenis | C. cf. sulcicaulis, sp | | | Cycad | |
| Ptilophyllum | P. pectiniformis, P. cf hirsutum | | | Member of Bennettitales | |
| Sphenozamites | S. bellii | | | Member of Bennettitales | |
| ?Weltrichia | Indeterminate | | | Member of Bennettitales | |
| Taeniopteris | T. vittata | | | Member of Bennettitales | |
| Bucklandia | B. bucklandii | | | Member of Bennettitales formerly Conites bucklandii | |
| Ginkgo | G. aff longifolius | | | Member of Ginkgoales | |
| Brachyphyllum | B. expansum | | | Member of Pinales | |
| Elatocladus | E. cf. laxus | | | Member of Pinales | |
| Masculostrobus | Indeterminate | | | Member of Pinales | |
| Classostrobus | Indeterminate | | | Cheirolepidiaceae | |
| Araucarites | A. brodei | | | Araucariaceae | |
| Pelourdea | | | | A conifer of uncertain affinities | |
| Carpolithes | Carpolithes diospyriformis, Carpolithes sp. | | | Plantae indet | |
| Phyllites | sp. | | | Morphotaxon for leaves of uncertain affinities | |

== See also ==
- List of dinosaur-bearing rock formations
