= Samuel Sharp (geologist) =

English geologist and antiquarian

- Born: 18 July 1814; Romsey
- Died: 28 January 1882 (aged 67); Great Harrowden Hall
- Occupations: Geologist and antiquarian

Samuel Sharp (18 July 1814 – 28 January 1882) was an English geologist and antiquarian. The fossil brachiopod Sharpirhynchia is named after him.

== Biography ==
Sharp, the son of Stephen Sharp and Anna Maria Bloor of Uppingham, was born on 18 July 1814 at Romsey in Hampshire. While still young he lost his father; his mother then removed to Stamford in Lincolnshire and married the proprietor and editor of the Stamford Mercury. Sharp, who for a considerable time aided his stepfather in conducting this newspaper, soon began to study geology. In 1857 he went to live near Northampton, where he continued his scientific work and increased his collection of fossils. He published two very valuable papers on the Northamptonshire oolites in the Quarterly Journal of the Geological Society (xxvi, 354; xxix, 225), besides a few of minor interest, and a useful textbook, Rudiments of Geology (1875), a second and enlarged edition of which was published in the following year. He was also a diligent student of local antiquities, forming a valuable collection of coins minted at Stamford and describing them in the Journal of the Numismatic Society. He was a fellow of that society, of the Society of Antiquaries, and from 1862 of the Geological Society. He married Caroline Ann Weldon in 1846 and died without issue on 28 January 1882, at Great Harrowden Hall, near Wellingborough, where the later years of his life were spent.
