= Blisworth Clay Formation =

Coordinates: 52°38′45″N 0°33′58″W

- Stratigraphic range: Bathonian
- Type: Geological formation
- Unit of: Great Oolite Group
- Underlies: Cornbrash Formation
- Overlies: Blisworth Limestone
- Thickness: up to 10 metres (30 ft) typically 2-4 metres

Lithology
- Primary: Mudstone
- Other: Sandstone, Limestone, Ironstone

Location
- Region: Europe
- Country: England
- Extent: East Midlands

Type section
- Named for: Blisworth

The Blisworth Clay Formation is a geological formation in England. It is part of the Great Oolite Group and was deposited in the Bathonian stage of the Middle Jurassic. The predominant lithology is mudstone with thin beds of limestone and sandstone with ironstone nodules. Towards the South-West it laterally transitions into the Forest Marble Formation.
