= Chipping Norton Limestone =

Geological formation in the Cotswolds, England

- Stratigraphic range: Bathonian; ~167–165 Ma
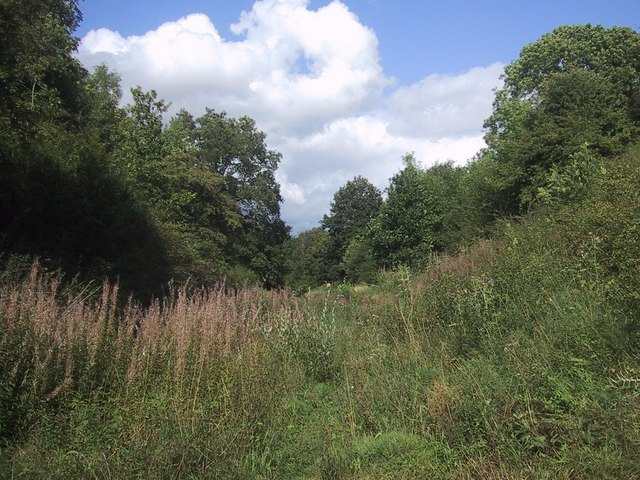
- Exposure of the Hook Norton Member at Hook Norton Cutting and Banks
- Type: Formation
- Unit of: Great Oolite Group
- Underlies: Fuller's Earth & Sharp's Hill Formations
- Overlies: Grantham, Northampton Sand & Whitby Mudstone Formations
- Thickness: 0–12 m (0–39 ft)

Lithology
- Primary: Limestone
- Other: Mudstone

Location
- Coordinates: 52.0°N 1.6°W
- Approximate paleocoordinates: 41.6°N 8.8°E
- Region: England
- Country: United Kingdom
- Extent: North Gloucestershire, north Oxfordshire

Type section
- Named for: Chipping Norton
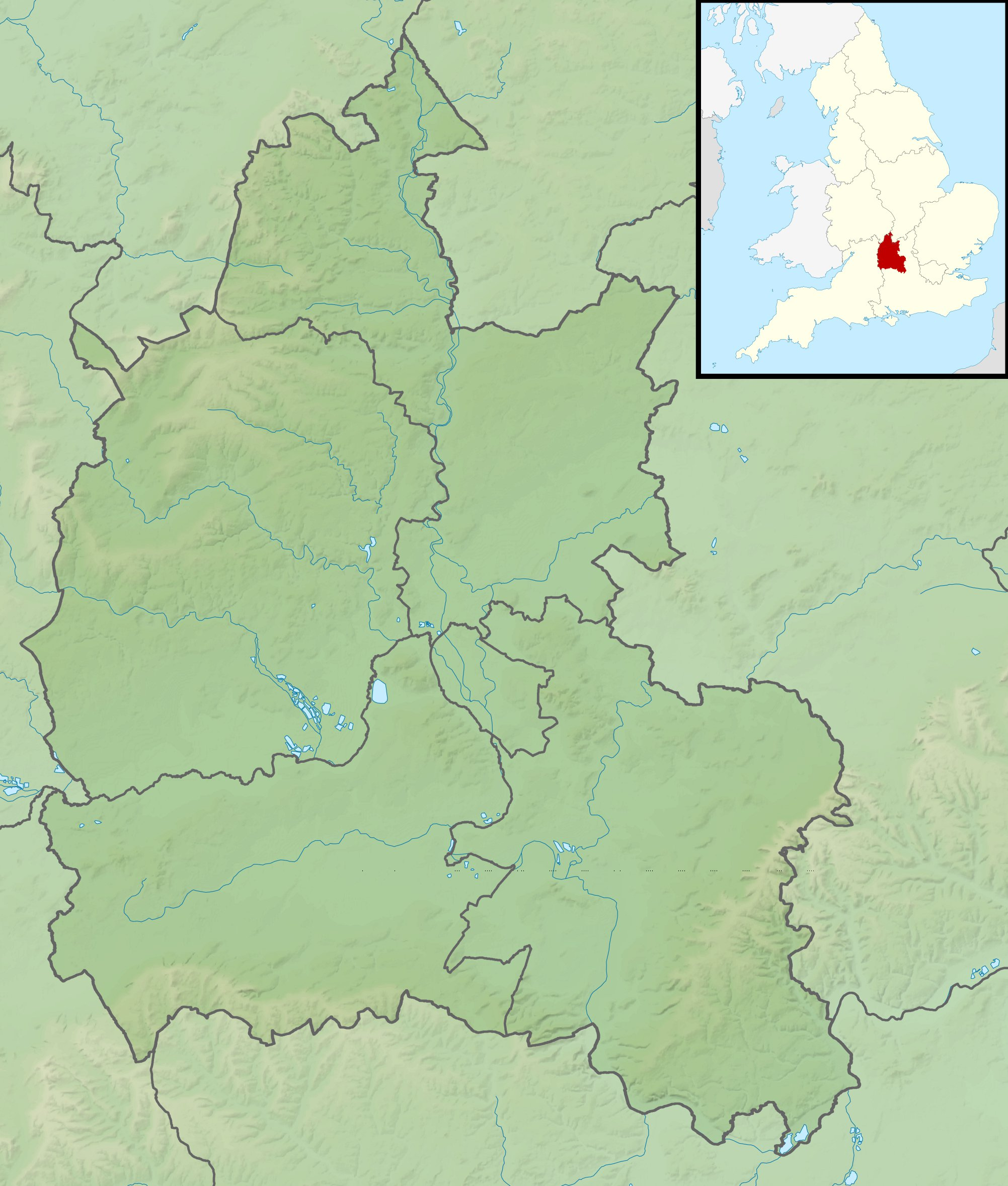
- Chipping Norton Limestone (England) Chipping Norton Limestone (Oxfordshire)

The Chipping Norton Limestone is a geological formation in the Cotswolds, England. It preserves fossils dating back to the Bathonian (Middle Jurassic). Including those of dinosaurs Cetiosaurus, Megalosaurus and Cruxicheiros as well as the Tritylodontid Stereognathus. It primarily consists of ooidal limestone.

== Fossil content ==
The so-called "Scrotum humanum" remains may have come from this formation.

Dinosaurs
Genus	Species	Location	Stratigraphic position	Material	Notes	Images
Alocodon	Indeterminate	Gloucestershire			Actually indeterminate ornithischian remains.	
Cetiosaurus	C. giganteus	Oxfordshire			Actually indeterminate sauropod remains.	
Cetiosaurus	Indeterminate	Gloucestershire; Oxfordshire			Actually indeterminate sauropod remains.	
Dromaeosauridae	Indeterminate	Oxfordshire	Woodeaton Quarry	"Teeth"	Indeterminate teeth. Remains represent three genera. Same species also present in the Forest Marble Formation.	
Megalosaurus	Indeterminate	Gloucestershire; ~~Oxfordshire~~			Oxfordshire remains later found to be from an indeterminate theropod.	
Lexovisaurus	L. durobrivensis	Oxfordshire				
Phyllodon	Indeterminate	Gloucestershire			Actually indeterminate ornithischian remains.	
Stegosauria	Indeterminate	Gloucestershire			Previously assigned to Stegosaurus sp. and (tentatively) Omosaurus vetustus.	"Scrotum humanum"
Streptospondylus	S. cuvieri	Oxfordshire		"Vertebrae [and] limb elements."	Actually indeterminate theropod remains.	
Troodontidae	Indeterminate	Oxfordshire	Hornsleasow Quarry	"Tooth"	Specimen GCLRM G8-23.	
Therizinosauroidea	Indeterminate	Oxfordshire	Hornsleasow Quarry	"Tooth"	Specimen GCLRM G167-32. First record of Therizinosauroidea in Europe.	

Color key: Taxon / Reclassified taxon / Taxon falsely reported as present / Dubious taxon or junior synonym / Ichnotaxon / Ootaxon / Morphotaxon	Notes; Uncertain or tentative taxa are in small text; ~~crossed out~~ taxa are discredited.

== See also ==
- List of dinosaur-bearing rock formations
- List of fossiliferous stratigraphic units in England
