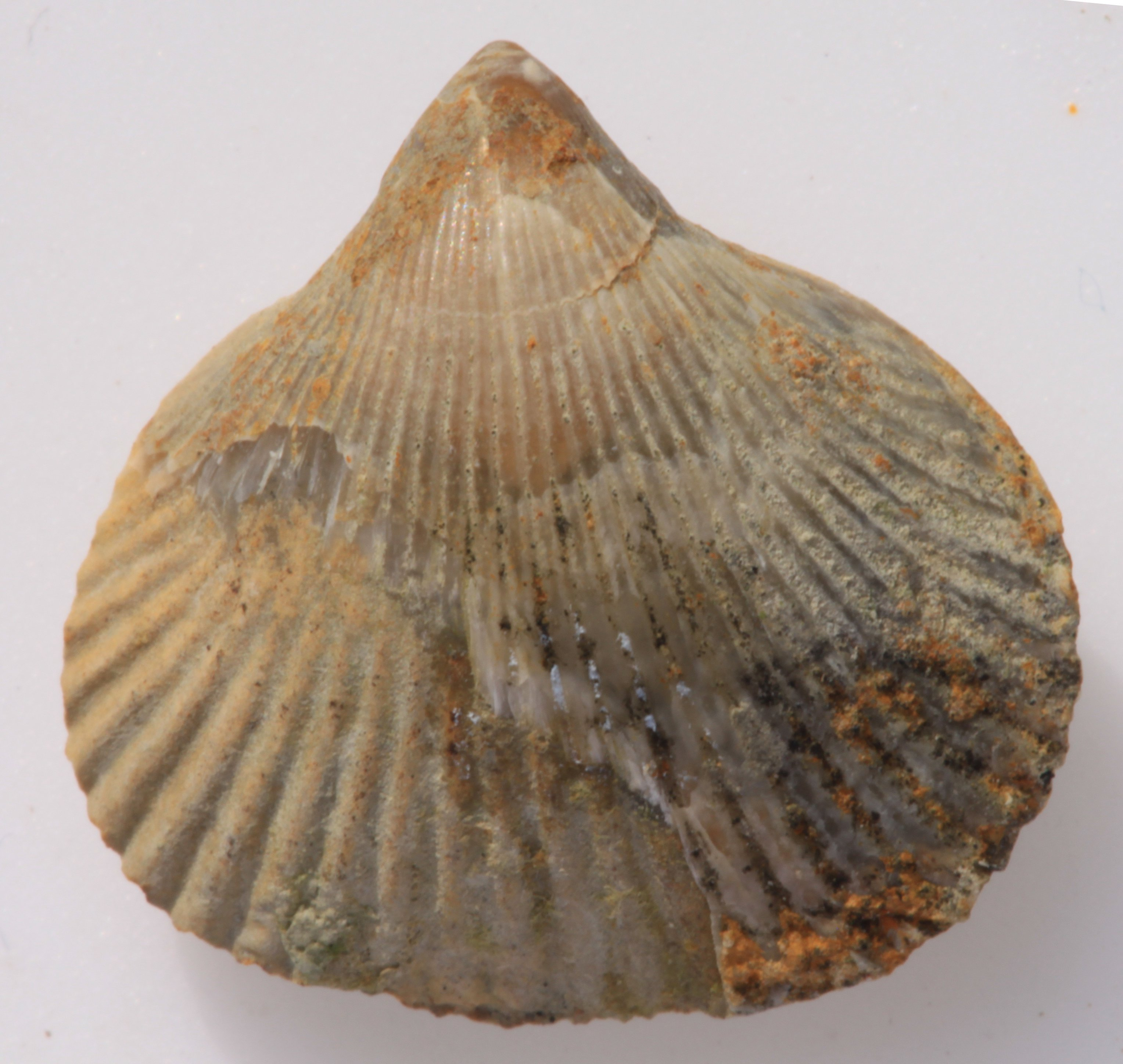
- Sharpirhynchia sharpi pedunculate valve

Scientific classification
- Kingdom: Animalia
- Phylum: Brachiopoda
- Class: Rhynchonellata
- Order: Rhynchonellida
- Family: Rhynchonellidae
- Genus: †Sharpirhynchia Shi & Grant, 1993

Synonyms
- Kallirhynchia sharpi

= Sharpirhynchia =

†Sharpirhynchia sharpi Temporal range: Middle Jurassic, 168–165 Ma

Extinct genus of brachiopods

Sharpirhynchia sharpi (synonym Kallirhynchia sharpi) is a species of extinct, small-sized lampshell, named after Samuel Sharp (1814–1882), an early fossil collector, who discovered the limited time span of some fossils, now known as index fossils. S. sharpi is a marine rhynchonellate brachiopod in the family Rhynchonellidae. It is roughly ½ inch (1.25 cm) measured along the axis, with a slender beak, the brachial valve more convex than the pedunculate valve, and it has 21–31 ribs fanning out from the hinge.

== Distribution ==
Fossils of Sharpirhynchia sharpi lived during the Middle Jurassic (Lower Bathonian) of United Kingdom. The specimen that the description is based upon was collected at the sharpi bed of Limekiln Quarry, Hopping Hill, near Northampton, England. Further collections originate from: Cranford South Quarry, Kettering; Corby, Lincolnshire; Islip, Northamptonshire; Cranwell Village, St. Giles, Lincolnshire, England; Sharnbrook, Bedfordshire, East Anglia; Woodeaton, Oxfordshire; north-east of Oundle, Northants., and at Thrapston, Northants.

== Habitat ==
During the Middle Jurassic, the fossil locations cited were seas, where this lampshell lived as a stationary epifaunal suspension feeder.

== Description ==
Sharpirhynchia sharpi has a small shell, subtrigonal to transverse or laterally elongate in adults; unequally biconvex, dorsal valve more convex than ventral one, subglobose in profile. Lateral commissures oblique ventrally; anterior commissure narrowly uniplicate; linguiform extension developed variably, generally low and U-shaped. No clear sulcation on dorsal umbone. Beak relatively long, acute, and suberect, with slightly incurved tip in adult; foramen big, oval, hypothyridid, with well developed rim; deltidial plates narrow, disjunct to just conjunct; beak ridges subangular; interareas small, but well defined and slightly concave, with fine and clear transverse lines. Ventral valve moderately convex; sulcus shallow and wide, well separated from slopes and with rounded bottom, occurring at posterior 1/3 to 1/2 of valve. Dorsal valve more convex than ventral one, with greatest convexity at anterior part, but recurved anteriorly; fold occurring at anterior 1/2 to 1/3 of valve, generally narrow and lower, with rounded top, moderately raised above slopes, giving valve trilobate appearance. Dorsal umbones rarely slightly sulcate or depressed. Numerous fine subangular costae separated by deep intervals, on each valve numbering 20-26, with 4-7 on fold and 3-6 in sinus; shell also bearing innumerable fine, conspicuous growth lines, becoming feebly lamellose or imbricated toward anterior margin. Gerontic shells thickened along margins, some costae occasionally bifurcating. No smooth areas observed.

Interior. — No secondary thickenings present in either valve, structures delicate. No pedicle collar observed in two sectioned specimens. Delthyrium wide, trapezoidal; lateral cavities narrow; dental plates long, beyond hinge zone, slightly divergent toward ventral floor at posterior parts and becoming parallel anteriorly; teeth short, very strong and massive, with expanded ends and crenulations; accessory denticulars and dental cavities present. No septalium or septalial plates in dorsal valve; septum short, reduced anteriorly to form low ridge, running about 1/3 of valve length; hinge plates thick and narrow, tapering toward each other at posterior parts and becoming horizontal anteriorly; inner socket ridges lower but well demarcated from hinge plates; hinge plates tapering forward; crural bases narrow, but well formed, given off dorsally from inner margins of hinge plates; crura calcarifer, about 1/3 of dorsal valve length, posterior parts trigonal-shaped in sections and curved slightly ventrally at anterior parts, but not as distinctive as those in Rhynchonelloidella.

The anatomical terms used in this description as defined by Williams and Brunton, 1997 can be found at the website on the Trenton Group fossils of the Department of Invertebrate Palaeontology of Harvard University.
