= Loddington, Northamptonshire =

Village in Northamptonshire, England

Coordinates: 52.3985°N 0.8036°W

Loddington
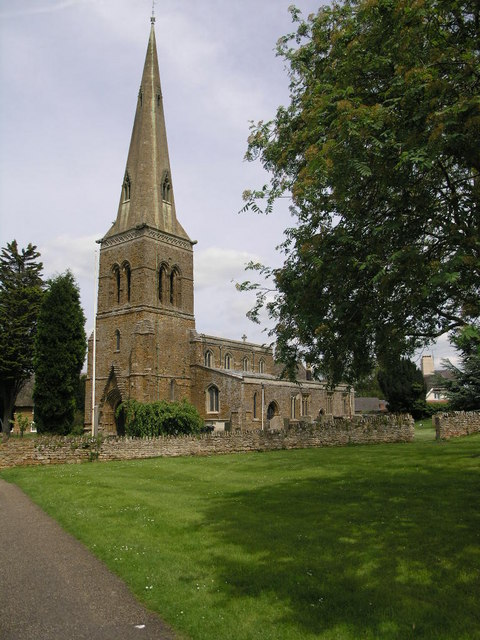
- St Leonard's parish church, seen from the southwest

- Location within Northamptonshire
- Population: 520 (2011 Census)
- OS grid reference: SP8178
- Civil parish: Loddington
- Unitary authority: North Northamptonshire
- Ceremonial county: Northamptonshire
- Region: East Midlands
- Country: England
- Sovereign state: United Kingdom
- Post town: Kettering
- Postcode district: NN14
- Dialling code: 01536
- Police: Northamptonshire
- Fire: Northamptonshire
- Ambulance: East Midlands
- UK Parliament: Kettering

Loddington is a village and civil parish about 3 miles (5 km) west of Kettering, Northamptonshire, England.

The 2001 Census recorded a parish population of 477 people including the neighbouring parish of Orton. The 2011 Census recorded the parish population as 520 people.

== Manor ==
The Domesday Book of 1086 records the toponym as Lodintone, meaning the enclosure, estate or homestead of Luda's people. Later spellings include Ludinton in 1199 and Lodinton in 1220.

The manor of Loddington was held in turn by the De Baud, Kynnesman, Syers, and Allicock families before being acquired by Lord Overstone.

Loddington Hall is the manor house. It was built in about 1290–1300 for Robert de Baud, then in charge of Royal works at Geddington, who had been High Sheriff of Northamptonshire 1280–88. It was remodelled for the Syers family about 1615 and passed in 1660 to the Kynnesman family. A large north wing was added in 1893. It is a Grade II* listed building.

In the 1900s the house was used as a school and a training centre. It has since been converted into flats.

== Parish church ==
The oldest parts of the Church of England parish church of St Leonard are 13th-century and include the west tower, south aisle and chapel. The present chancel was built about 1300. The church has alterations and additions from the 14th century and 1578, including a clerestory for the nave. The building was restored in 1859 under the direction of the Gothic Revival architect Ewan Christian. It is a Grade II* listed building.

The west tower has a broach spire. The tower belfry has three bells, all cast in 1803 by Robert Taylor of Loughborough, Leicestershire.

== Ironstone ==
Loddington is situated on the ironstone beds that run through Northamptonshire, and these were worked commercially at Loddington from 1892 until 1963 by the Loddington Iron Ore Company. A metre (3 ft 3^{3}/_{8} in) gauge tramway connected the ironstone pits to the nearby standard gauge line from Kettering to Cransley. In 1958, the tramway was converted to standard gauge and worked as a branch from Cransley to Loddington.

== Amenities ==
Loddington had a pub, The Hare. This public house closed down in early 2024.

== Bibliography ==
- Ekwall, Eilert (1960) [1936]. Concise Oxford Dictionary of English Place-Names (4th ed.). Oxford: Oxford University Press. Loddington. ISBN 0198691033.
- Pevsner, Nikolaus; Cherry, Bridget (revision) (1973) [1961]. Northamptonshire. The Buildings of England (2nd ed.). Harmondsworth: Penguin Books. pp. 295–296. ISBN 0-14-071022-1.
- RCHME, ed. (1979). "Loddington". An Inventory of the Historical Monuments in the County of Northamptonshire. Vol. 2, Archaeological Sites in Central Northamptonshire. London: Her Majesty's Stationery Office. p. 120.

Media related to Loddington, Northamptonshire at Wikimedia Commons
