= Rutland Formation =

English geologic formation

- Stratigraphic range: Bajocian-Bathonian
- Type: Formation
- Unit of: Great Oolite Group
- Sub-units: Stamford Member, Thorncroft Sand Member, Wellingborough Limestone Member
- Underlies: Blisworth Limestone, White Limestone Formation
- Overlies: Lincolnshire limestone, Northampton Sand Formation
- Thickness: Typically about 8 to 12m, up to 15m

Lithology
- Primary: Mudstone
- Other: Limestone

Location
- Region: England
- Country: United Kingdom

The Rutland Formation is a geologic formation in England. It preserves fossils dated to the late Bajocian to Bathonian ages of the Jurassic period, about 169 million years ago. It is the lateral equivalent of the Sharp's Hill Formation and the Fuller's Earth Formation. The "Rutland Dinosaur" specimen of Cetiosaurus is known from the formation.

== Paleobiota ==
Genus	Species	Dist.	Member	Material	Notes	Images
Cetiosaurus	C. oxoniensis	Great Casterton Quarry	Freshwater Series	"Rutland Dinosaur" specimen consisting of " cervicals `2±14', some with ribs of the left or both sides; neural arches, spines or centra of at least 11 dorsals and many thoracic rib fragments; at least four sacral centra, with parts of the parapophyses; four sacral ribs and possible sacral spines; 13 anterior caudals; several damaged chevrons; fragments of both ilia and the left ischium; and the right femur."		Cetiosaurus
Sauropoda	Indet	Woodeaton Quarry		Undescribed.		
Dinosauria	Indet	Woodeaton Quarry		Undescribed.		

== See also ==
- List of fossiliferous stratigraphic units in England
- List of dinosaur-bearing rock formations
