= Great Oolite Group =

- Stratigraphic range: Bajocian-Callovian
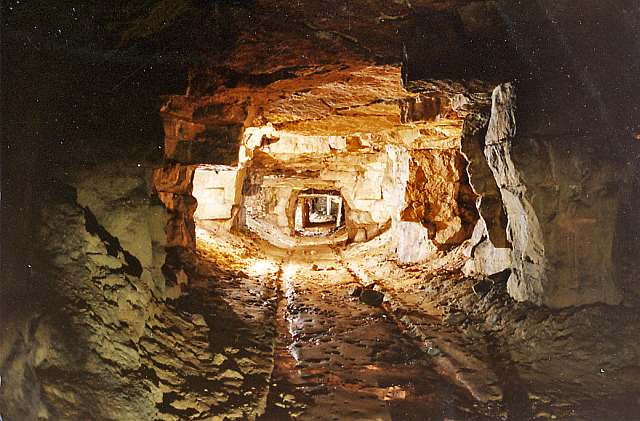
- The Combe Down and Bathampton Down Mines, where the Great Oolite Group can be found
- Type: Group
- Sub-units: Cornbrash Formation, Chipping Norton Limestone, Sharp's Hill Formation, Taynton Limestone Formation, Forest Marble Formation, Hampen Formation, White Limestone Formation, Rutland Formation, Blisworth Limestone, Blisworth Clay Formation, Chalfield Oolite Formation, Corsham Limestone Formation, Athelstan Oolite Formation, Horsehay Sand Formation, Tresham Rock Formation
- Underlies: Ancholme Group
- Overlies: Inferior Oolite Group
- Thickness: 22–200 m (72–656 ft) (224 m (735 ft) offshore)

Lithology
- Primary: Limestone, Mudstone
- Other: Sandstone

Location
- Region: Europe
- Country: England
- Extent: Dorset to Norfolk

Type section
- Named for: Oolite

The Great Oolite Group is a Middle Jurassic stratigraphic unit that outcrops in southern England. It consists of a complex set of marine deposits primarily mudstone and bioclastic ooidal and fine grained limestone, deposited in nearshore to shelf settings. It is exposed at the surface as a variably thick belt extending roughly NE-SW from the coast of Dorset up to the Humber. It is also present at depth in the Weald and Wessex Basins, as well as offshore. Several of the constituent formations, notably the Taynton Limestone Formation and the Forest Marble Formation are notable for their fossil content, including those of dinosaurs and pterosaurs and some of the earliest mammals.

== Paleofauna ==
- Cardiodon rugulosus
- Cetiosaurus oxoniensis
- Dromaeosauridae indet.
- Eoplophysis vetustus (stegosaurid indet)
- Megalosaurus bucklandii
- Proceratosaurus bradleyi
- Seldsienean megistorhynchus

== See also ==
- List of dinosaur-bearing rock formations
  - List of stratigraphic units with few dinosaur genera
