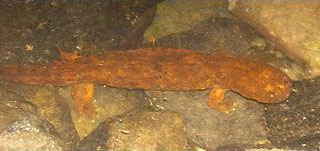
- Cryptobranchus alleganiensis
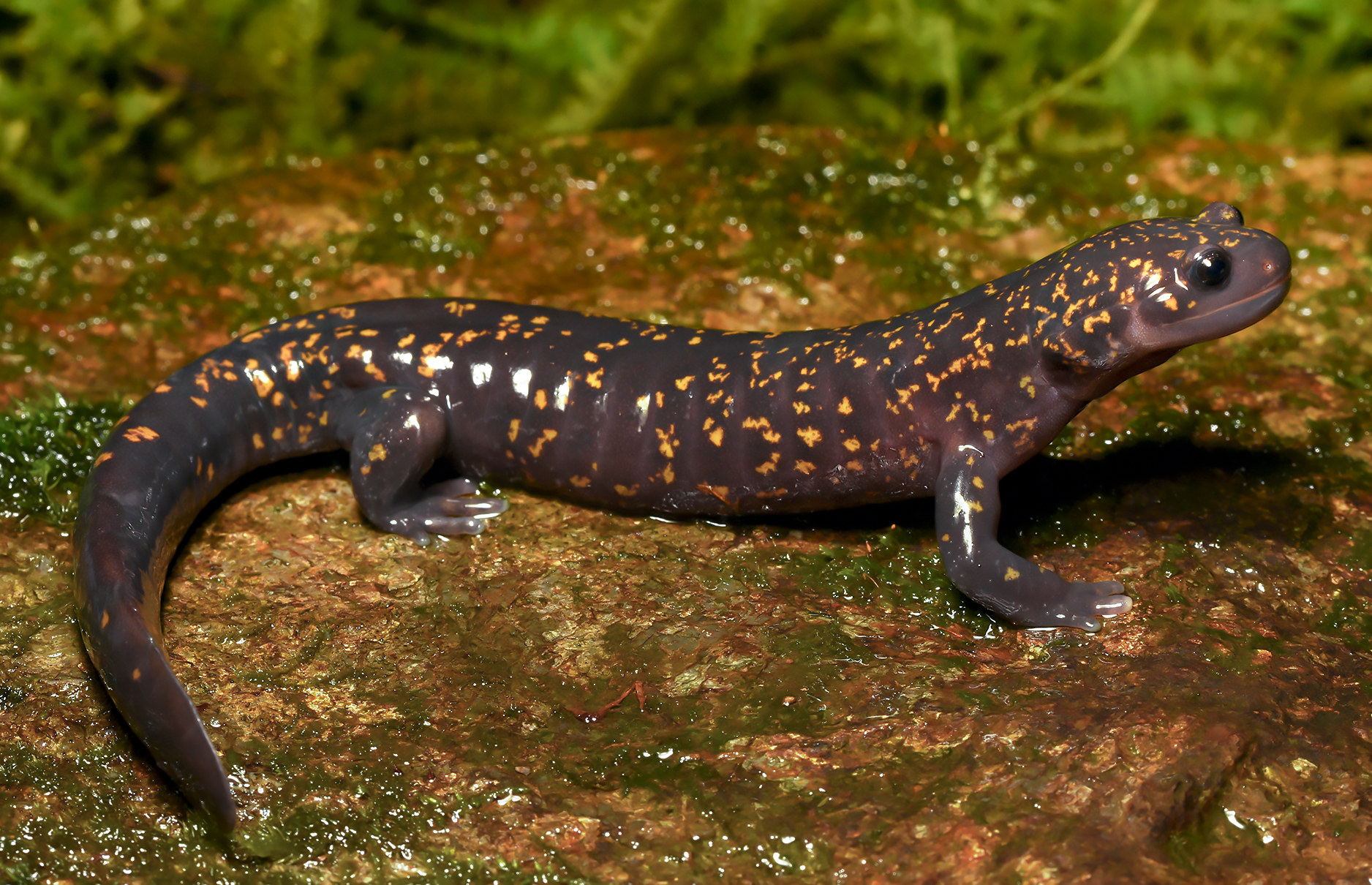
- Hynobius fossigenus

Scientific classification
- Kingdom: Animalia
- Phylum: Chordata
- Class: Amphibia
- Order: Urodela
- Suborder: Cryptobranchoidea; Dunn, 1922

Subgroups
- †Chunerpeton?; †Jeholotriton; †Pangerpeton; †Nesovtriton?; †Iridotriton?; †Kiyatriton?; †Laccotriton; †Sinerpeton; Cryptobranchidae; Panhynobia Ji, Anderson & Gao, 2021; †Liaoxitriton; †Linglongtriton; †Neimengtriton; †Regalerpeton; †Nuominerpeton; Hynobiidae

= Cryptobranchoidea =

Cryptobranchoidea Temporal range: Middle Jurassic - Present Bathonian–Present

Suborder of salamanders

The Cryptobranchoidea are a suborder of salamanders found in Asia, European Russia, and the United States. They are known as primitive salamanders, in contrast to Salamandroidea, the advanced salamanders. It has two living subdivisions, Cryptobranchidae (Asian giant salamanders and hellbenders), and Hynobiidae, commonly known as Asian salamanders.

Giant salamanders are obligate paedomorphs with partial metamorphosis, but Asiatic salamander goes through a full metamorphosis. The only known exceptions are the Longdong stream salamander, which has been documented as facultatively neotenic, and the Ezo salamander, where a now assumed extinct population from Lake Kuttarush in Hokkaido had neotenic traits like gills in adults.

The oldest members of the group are known from the Middle Jurassic (Bathonian) aged Yanliao Biota of China.

== Taxonomy ==
This suborder contains only two families at present. All other members are extinct and are only known as fossils.

- †Chunerpeton Haifanggou Formation, China, Middle Jurassic (Bathonian) (neotenic) (Note that this taxon has alternatively been recovered outside of Cryptobranchoidea or even outside Urodela)
- †Jeholotriton Haifanggou Formation, China, Middle Jurassic (Bathonian) (neotenic)
- †Pangerpeton Haifanggou Formation, China, Middle Jurassic (Bathonian)
- †Nesovtriton Bissekty Formation, Uzbekistan, Late Cretaceous (Turonian)
- †Iridotriton Morrison Formation, United States, Late Jurassic (Tithonian)
- †Kiyatriton Itat Formation, Russia, Middle Jurassic (Bathonian) Ilek Formation, Russia, Early Cretaceous (Barremian-Aptian) (Presumed to be a cryptobranchoid)
- †Laccotriton Fengshan fossil bed, China, Late Jurassic (Tithonian)
- †Sinerpeton Fengshan fossil bed, China, Late Jurassic (Tithonian)
- Cryptobranchidae (Late Cretaceous-Recent)
- Panhynobia
  - †Liaoxitriton Jiufotang Formation, China, Early Cretaceous (Aptian)
  - †Linglongtriton Tiaojishan Formation, China, Late Jurassic (Oxfordian)
  - †Neimengtriton Haifanggou Formation, China, Middle Jurassic (Bathonian)
  - †Regalerpeton Dabeigou Formation, China, Early Cretaceous (Hauterivian)
  - †Nuominerpeton Longjiang Formation, China, Early Cretaceous (Aptian)
  - Hynobiidae (Miocene-Recent)
