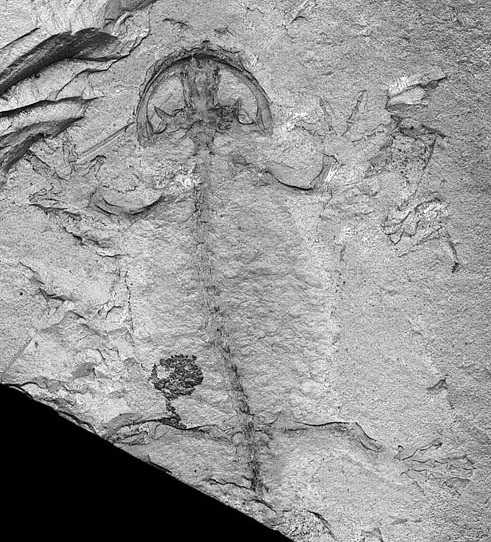

Scientific classification
- Kingdom: Animalia
- Phylum: Chordata
- Class: Amphibia
- Genus: †Pangerpeton; Wang & Evans, 2006
- Species: †P. sinensis

Binomial name
- †Pangerpeton sinensis Wang & Evans, 2006

= Pangerpeton =

Pangerpeton Temporal range: Middle or Late Jurassic, 164 Ma

Extinct genus of salamanders

Pangerpeton is an extinct genus of salamanders. Its monotypic species is Pangerpeton sinensis.

Pangerpeton is a metamorphosed, primitive salamander from the Late Jurassic Daohugou fossil bed near Wubaiding Village of Lingyuan City, Liaoning Province, China. It is part of the Yanliao Biota.

Yuan Wang and Susan E. Evans (2006) named this new taxon with a phylogenetic analysis of caudates at familial level including fossil taxa, such as Marmorerpeton, Karaurus, Jeholotriton, Chunerpeton, Liaoxitriton, Iridotriton, and Valdotriton. The analysis placed Pangerpeton as a sister taxon to Jeholotriton from the equivalent fossil bed, and the two are close to the base of crown−group Urodela either just outside it or just within. In 2022 a more comprehensive phylogenetic analysis, that included additional outgroups such as frogs and Triassurus, recovered Pangerpeton sinensis as a stem-group caudatan, just outside the crown group of modern salamanders.

This Jurassic amphibian is characterized by its short trunk (only 14 presacrals) and short and wide head, giving a fat body shape, from which the genus name was derived ("Pang" means fat in Chinese).

== See also ==
- Prehistoric amphibian
- List of prehistoric amphibians
