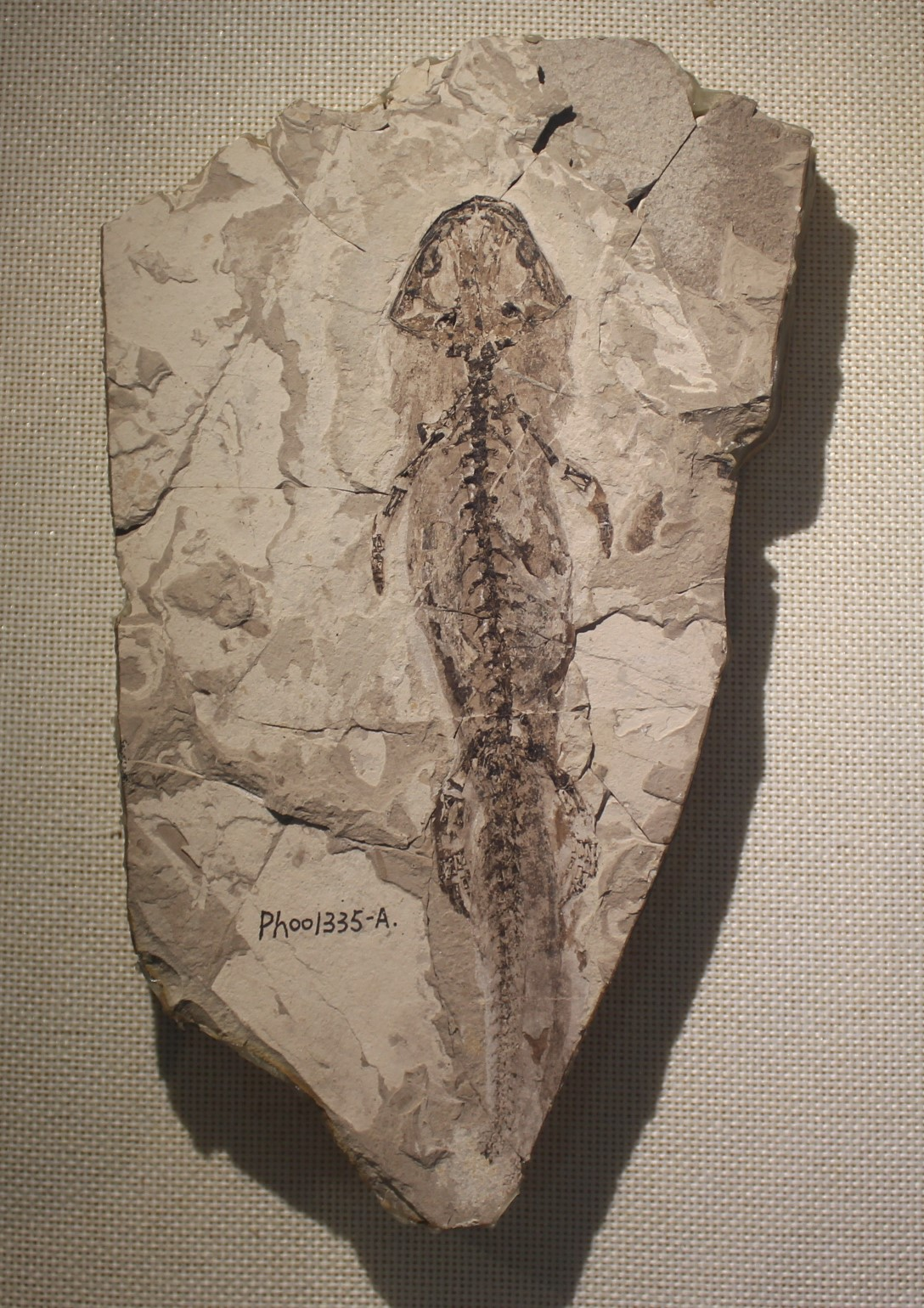
- Fossil specimen of C. tianyiensis, Beijing Museum of Natural History

Scientific classification
- Kingdom: Animalia
- Phylum: Chordata
- Class: Amphibia
- Subclass: Lissamphibia
- Superorder: Batrachia
- Clade: Caudata
- Genus: †Chunerpeton; Gao & Shubin, 2003
- Species: †C. tianyiensis

Binomial name
- †Chunerpeton tianyiensis Gao & Shubin, 2003

= Chunerpeton =

Chunerpeton Temporal range: Middle or Late Jurassic, 164 Ma

Extinct genus of salamanders

Chunerpeton (meaning "early creeping animal") is an extinct genus of salamander from the Middle or Late Jurassic Daohugou Beds in Ningcheng County, Nei Mongol (Inner Mongolia), China, containing the only species Chunerpeton tianyiensis. It was a small animal measuring 18 cm (7.1 in) in length, and was neotenic, with the retention of external gills into adulthood.

In the original description it was placed in Cryptobranchidae, which contains modern giant salamanders. A redescription published in 2020 found it to be a stem-group caudatan outside the crown group of modern salamanders. A 2021 study found it to be a member of Cryptobranchoidea outside of Cryptobranchidae. In 2022, a more extensive analysis, with greater character and taxon sampling, also recovered Chunerpeton as a stem-group caudatan, outside the crown group of modern salamanders, and associated with Beiyanerpeton and Qinglongtriton.

Chunerpeton has been used to constrain the age of Cryptobranchoidea in over a dozen molecular divergence analyses, but given the uncertain affinity of the taxon it should perhaps no longer be used in this way. It lived alongside likely stem-group salamanders, such as Jeholotriton, Liaoxitriton, and Pangerpeton, all of which lived at the same age.
