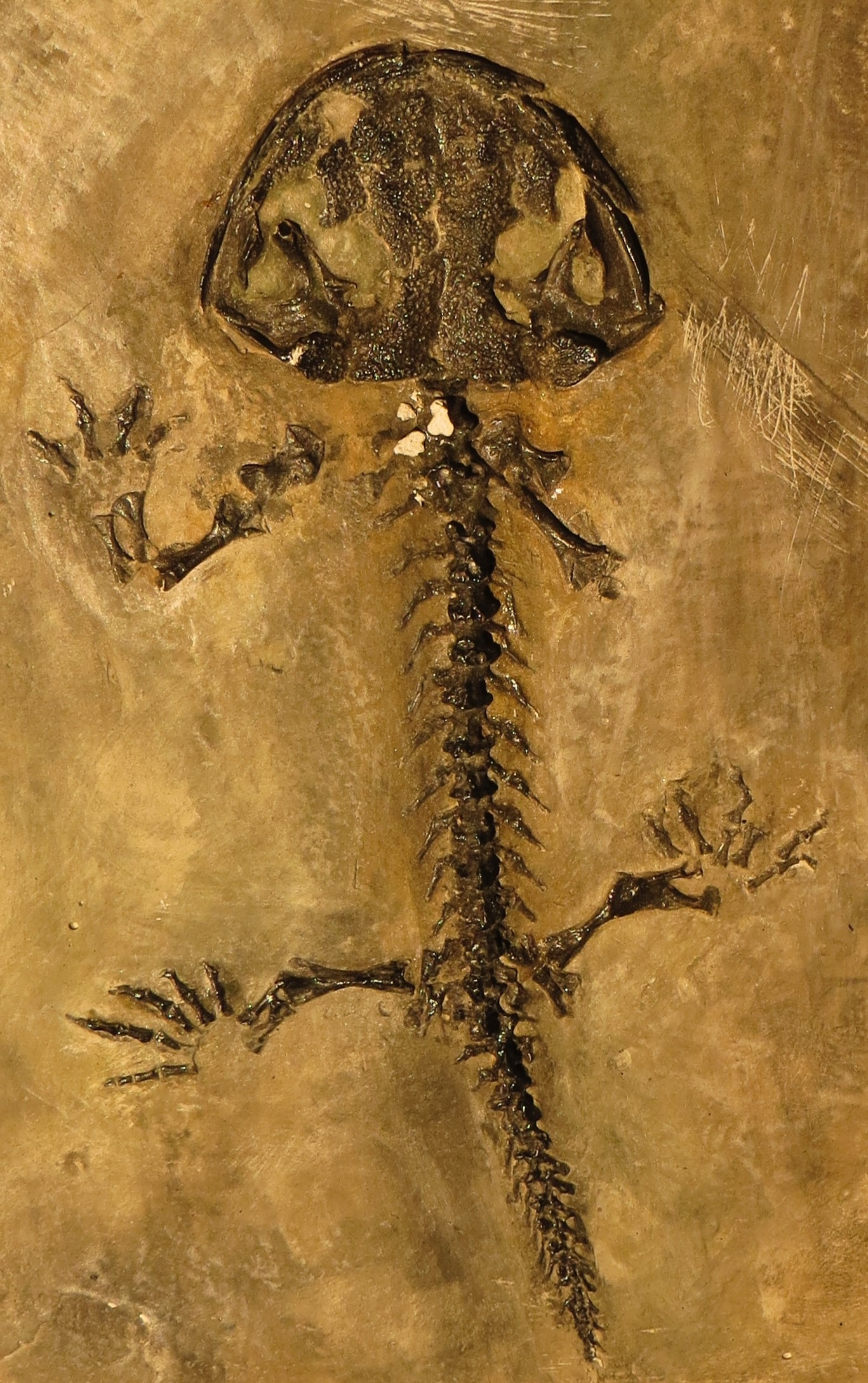
- Fossil of the salamander Karaurus sharovi, a non-urodelan caudatan from the Middle-Late Jurassic belonging to the family Karauridae

Scientific classification
- Kingdom: Animalia
- Phylum: Chordata
- Class: Amphibia
- Superorder: Batrachia
- Clade: Caudata; Scopoli, 1777

Subgroups
- Urodela; †Egoria; †Karauridae; †Kulgeriherpeton; †Triassurus; †Urupia; †Batrachosauroididae(?)

= Caudata =

Caudates Temporal range: 237–0 Ma Middle Triassic – Present

Clade of amphibians

The Caudata are a group of amphibians containing the extant salamanders (the order Urodela) and all extinct species of amphibians more closely related to salamanders than to frogs. They are typically characterized by a superficially lizard-like appearance, with slender bodies, blunt snouts, short limbs projecting at right angles to the body, and the presence of a tail in both larvae and adults.

Disagreement exists between different authorities as to the definition of the terms "Caudata" and "Urodela". Some maintain that Urodela should be restricted to the crown group, with Caudata being used for the total group. Others restrict the name Caudata to the crown group and use Urodela for the total group. The former approach seems to be most widely adopted and is used in this article.

== Evolution ==
The origins and evolutionary relationships between the three main groups of amphibians (apodans, urodeles and anurans) is a matter of debate. A 2005 molecular phylogeny, based on rDNA analysis, suggested that the first divergence between these three groups took place soon after they had branched from the lobe-finned fish in the Devonian (around 360 million years ago), and before the breakup of the supercontinent Pangaea. The briefness of this period, and the speed at which radiation took place, may help to account for the relative scarcity of amphibian fossils that appear to be closely related to lissamphibians. However, more recent studies have generally found more recent (Late Carboniferous to Early Permian) age for the basalmost divergence among lissamphibians.

The earliest known fossil salamanders include Kokartus honorarius from the Middle Jurassic of Kyrgyzstan and three species of the apparently neotenic, aquatic Marmorerpeton from England and Scotland of a similar date. Karaurus, Kokartus, and Marmorerpeton are together grouped in the extinct group Karauridae according to the structure of their skull and vertebrae. They looked superficially like robust modern salamanders but lacked a number of anatomical features that characterise all modern salamanders. Karaurus sharovi from the Upper Jurassic of Kazakhstan resembled modern mole salamanders in morphology and probably had a similar burrowing lifestyle.

In 2020, new specimens of the previously enigmatic tetrapod Triassurus from the Middle Triassic of Kyrgyzstan were described, revealing it to be the oldest known caudatan and this conclusion has been supported by subsequent analyses.

The Cryptobranchoidea and the Salamandroidea, also known as Diadectosalamandroidei, are likely sister groups. Some studies suggest that both groups appeared before the end of the Jurassic, the former being exemplified by Chunerpeton tianyiensis, Pangerpeton sinensis, Jeholotriton paradoxus, Regalerpeton weichangensis, Liaoxitriton daohugouensis and Iridotriton hechti, and the latter by Beiyanerpeton jianpingensis. By the Upper Cretaceous, most or all of the living salamander families had probably appeared. However, recent phylogenetic analysis suggest that several fossil species previously thought to represent crown group salamanders may actually represent members of the stem group.

Cryptobranchoidea are sometimes referred to as primitive salamanders whereas Salamandroidea / Diadectosalamandroidei are referred to as advanced salamanders. However, these labels are not necessarily helpful and imply that all members of Cryptobranchoidea are unchanged and represent the ancestral condition which is not supported by the fossil record.

All known extant and extinct (fossil) salamanders fall under the total group Caudata, whereas the common ancestor of all extant salamanders and all of its descendants (extinct and extant) represent the less inclusive crown group Urodela. There are about 758 extant species of salamander.
