= Yanliao Biota =

Middle-Late Jurassic assembly of fossils in China

The Yanliao Biota is the name given to an assembly of fossils preserved in northeastern China from the Middle to Late Jurassic. It includes fossils from the Tiaojishan Formation and Haifanggou Formation. This spans approximately 165 to 150 million years ago.

Like the Jehol Biota, these deposits are composed of alternating layers of volcanic tuff and sediment, and are considered Lagerstätte. These are some of the best preserved Jurassic fossils in the world, and include many important dinosaur, mammal, salamander, insect and lizard specimens, as well as plants.

== History ==
The first fossils of the Yanliao Biota were found around 1998 near the village of Daohugou in Inner Mongolia. The following year, the first two important specimens were discovered, and published in 2000. Since that time many more have been found from the same area, and in neighbouring provinces.

The Yanliao Biota is made up of fossils from more than one locality, and the geology has been difficult to interpret (see below). It includes what was previously referred to as the Daohugou Biota, and some of it was thought to belong to the Jehol Biota.

== Location ==
The Yanliao Biota comes from outcrops north of the Han Mountains, in the northeast of the People's Republic of China. The most important site is near Daohugou Village in Inner Mongolia, but fossils and outcrops are also found in neighbouring Liaoning Province and Heibei Province.

== Geology ==
The Dauhugou locality lies in the Ningchen Basin in the SE corner of Inner Mongolia. Dauhugou village has fossil-bearing lacustrine (laid down in lakes) strata overlying precambrian basement.

== Fossil preservation ==
The formations that yield the fossils of the Yanliao Biota are known as Lagerstätte, meaning that they have exceptionally good conditions for fossil preservation. The fossils are not only numerous, but also very well preserved. For vertebrates, there are often whole skeletons with soft tissues like skin and fur, colour patterns, and stomach contents. Insects are intact with wings and patterns preserved, and plants have their leaves and flowers still attached. The volcanic ash layers quickly buried the organisms, and created an anoxic environment around them, preventing scavenging and helping preserve them.

== Fossils ==
=== Dinosaurs ===
- Anchiornis huxleyi
- Aurornis xui
- Caihong juji
- Eosinopteryx brevipenna
- Epidendrosaurus ningchengensis
- Epidexipteryx hui
- Pedopenna daohugouensis
- Pulaosaurus qinglong
- Scansoriopteryx heilmanni
- Serikornis sungei
- Tianyulong confuciusi
- Xiaotingia zhengi
- Yi qi

=== Pterosaurs ===
- Archaeoistiodactylus linglongtaensis (possibly Darwinopterus; Martill and Etches, 2012)
- Cascocauda rong
- Changchengopterus pani
- Darwinopterus modularis
- Darwinopterus linglongtaensis
- Darwinopterus robustodens
- Dendrorhynchoides mutoudengensis
- Fenghuangopterus lii
- Jianchangnathus robustus
- Jianchangopterus zhaoianus
- Jeholopterus ningchengensis
- Kunpengopterus sinensis
- Pterorhynchus wellnhoferi
- Qinglongopterus guoi
- Sinomacrops bondei
- Wukongopterus lii

=== Mammaliaforms ===
- Arboroharamiya jenkinsi
- Castorocauda lutrasimilis
- Docofossor brachydactylus
- Juramaia sinensis
- Maiopatagium furculiferum
- Megaconus mammaliaformis
- Microdocodon gracilis
- Mirusodens caii
- Rugosodon eurasiaticus
- Vilevolodon diplomylos
- Volaticotherium antiquum

=== Caudates ===
- Beiyanerpeton jianpingensis
- Chunerpeton tianyiensis
- Jeholotriton paradoxus
- Neimengtriton daohugouensis
- Pangerpeton sinensis

== See also ==
- Daohugou Biota
