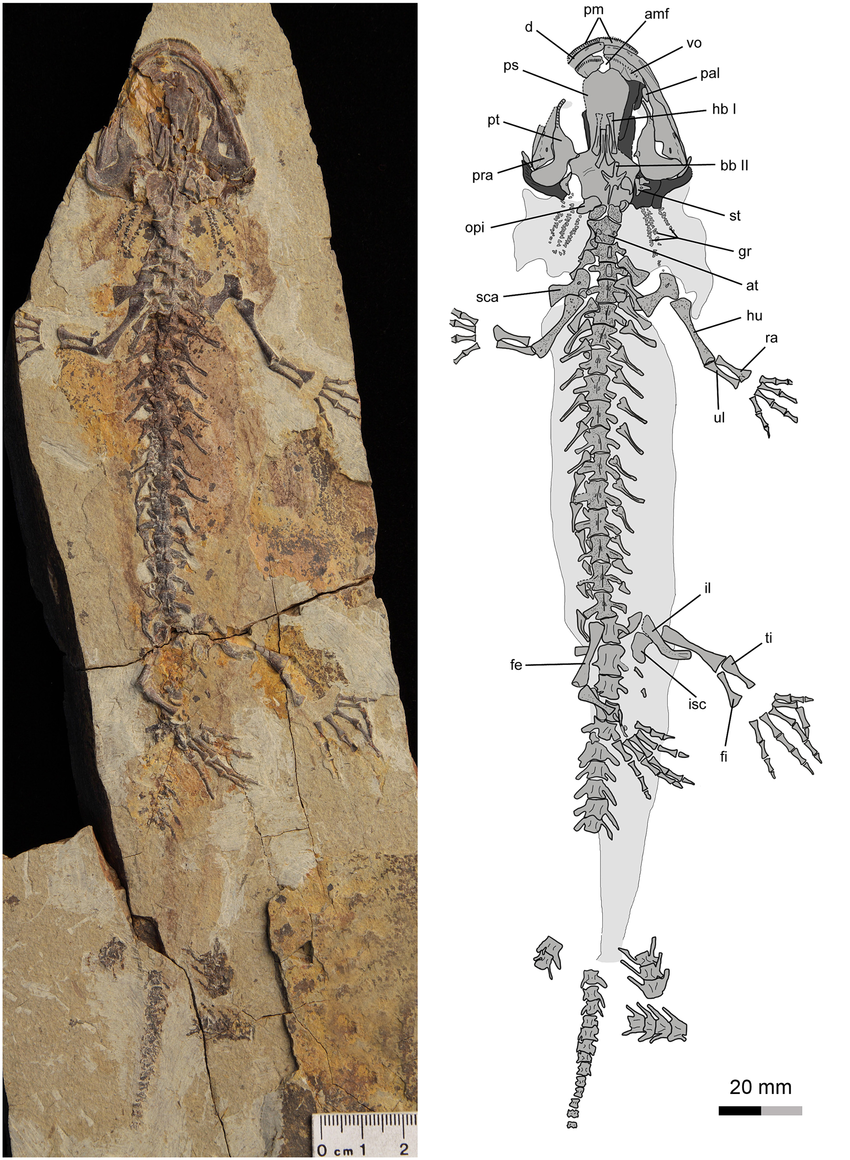
- Holotype

Scientific classification
- Kingdom: Animalia
- Phylum: Chordata
- Class: Amphibia
- Clade: Caudata
- Genus: †Qinglongtriton; Jia & Gao, 2016
- Species: †Q. gangouensis

Binomial name
- †Qinglongtriton gangouensis Jia & Gao, 2016

= Qinglongtriton =

Qinglongtriton Temporal range: Oxfordian

Extinct genus of salamanders

Qinglongtriton is an extinct genus of salamanders from the Late Jurassic (Oxfordian age) of what is now Hebei, China. It contains one species, Q. gangouensis, which is known from numerous adult and juvenile specimens collected from the Tiaojishan Formation. It was closely related to the salamander Beiyanerpeton from the same formation; both of these were at first included in Salamandroidea, the suborder containing the majority of modern salamanders, but later analyses have sometimes placed them as stem group salamanders instead.
