= Nesovtriton =

Nesovtriton Temporal range: Late Cretaceous

Scientific classification
- Kingdom: Animalia
- Phylum: Chordata
- Class: Amphibia
- Order: Urodela
- Suborder: Cryptobranchoidea
- Genus: †Nesovtriton; Skutschas, 2009

Species
- N. mynbulakensis Skutschas, 2009 (type)

Extinct genus of salamanders

Nesovtriton is an extinct genus of cryptobranchoid salamander known from the Late Cretaceous (Turonian age) of Bissekty Formation, in Uzbekistan. It was first named by Pavel P. Skutschas in 2009 and the type species is Nesovtriton mynbulakensis.
