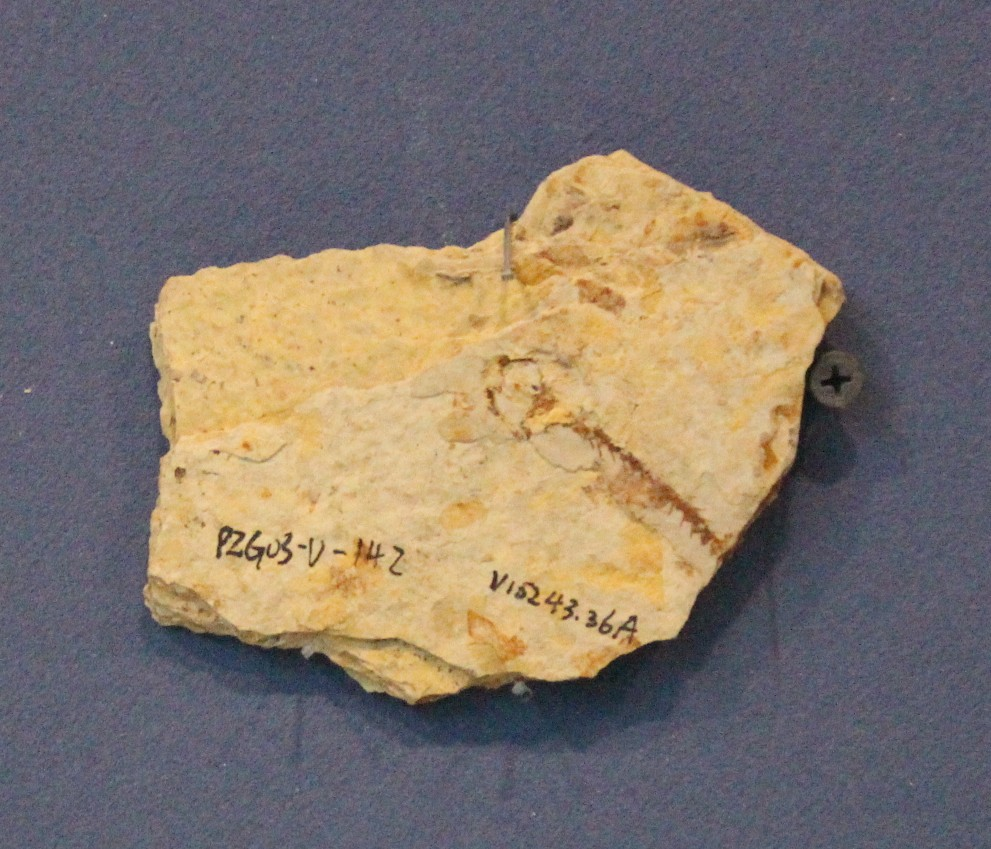
- L. orientalis specimen at the Baoding Natural History Museum

Scientific classification
- Kingdom: Animalia
- Phylum: Chordata
- Class: Amphibia
- Clade: Caudata
- Genus: †Laccotriton; Gao et al. 1998

Type species
- †Laccotriton subsolanus Gao et al. 1998

= Laccotriton =

Extinct genus of salamanders

Laccotriton is an extinct genus of prehistoric salamanders which lived in Eastern Asia during the Early Cretaceous. A nearly complete skeleton of L. subsolanus was found at Hebei, China.

== See also ==
- List of prehistoric amphibians
