= Sinerpeton =

Sinerpeton Temporal range: Tithonian

Scientific classification
- Kingdom: Animalia
- Phylum: Chordata
- Class: Amphibia
- Order: Urodela
- Genus: †Sinerpeton; Gao & Shubin, 2001

Type species
- Sinerpeton fengshanense Gao & Shubin, 2001

Synonyms
- Sinerpeton fengshanensis Gao & Shubin, 2001

Extinct genus of salamanders

Sinerpeton is an extinct genus of salamander from the Late Jurassic of China. It is monotypic and consists of one species, S. fengshanense.

== Discovery and naming ==
Sinerpeton was recovered from Late Jurassic (Tithonian) fossil beds in Fengshan, China, which overlay the Zhangjiakou Formation. The type species was originally named S. fengshanensis, though was later amended to the proper S. fengshanense.

== Description ==
Sinerpeton retains various characteristics basal to salamanders, including small dorsal processes on the maxillae, nasals that articulate in the midline, separate angular and coronoid bones, and the fusion of the first and second distal carpals. It has unicapitate ribs, similar to cryptobranchoids. Based on its ossified mesopodium and paired ceratobranchials, it was originally suggested that Sinerpeton retained its external gills into adulthood, though ossified ceratobranchials occur in both metamorphosed and neotenic salamanders, and the presence of ossified mesopodial elements suggests it likely underwent conventional metamorphosis.

== See also ==
- Prehistoric amphibian
- List of prehistoric amphibians
