= Valdotriton =

Valdotriton Temporal range: Early Cretaceous, 125–130 Ma

Scientific classification
- Kingdom: Animalia
- Phylum: Chordata
- Class: Amphibia
- Order: Urodela
- Genus: †Valdotriton; Evans and Milner, 1996

Type species
- †V. gracilis Evans and Milner, 1996

Genus of salamanders

Valdotriton is a genus of extinct prehistoric salamanders. Its only known species is Valdotriton gracilis (also known as the Wealden newt). V. gracilis lived during the Late Barremian in what is now Spain. It was found in the Las Hoyas locality. It represents one of the oldest known members of Salamandroidea.

== Description ==
V. gracilis was a fairly small salamander, available specimens ranging from 28 millimetres (1.1 in) to 40 millimetres (1.6 in) in length, however no single specimen could decisively be determined to be an adult. In all specimens, however, the tail was longer than the torso.

== See also ==
- List of prehistoric amphibians
