= Iridotriton =

Iridotriton Temporal range: Late Jurassic

Scientific classification
- Kingdom: Animalia
- Phylum: Chordata
- Class: Amphibia
- Clade: Caudata
- Genus: †Iridotriton; Evans et al., 2005

Type species
- †Iridotriton hechti Evans et al., 2005

Extinct genus of salamanders

Iridotriton is an extinct genus of salamander known from a fossil discovered in stratigraphic zone 6 of the late Jurassic Morrison Formation, within the Dinosaur National Monument, and contains one described species, Iridotriton hechti. It is likely a member of Cryptobranchoidea.

== See also ==
- Paleobiota of the Morrison Formation
