= Regalerpeton =

Regalerpeton Temporal range: Early Cretaceous
- R. weichangensis, Chaoyang Paleontological Museum

Scientific classification
- Kingdom: Animalia
- Phylum: Chordata
- Class: Amphibia
- Order: Urodela
- Stem group: Hynobiidae
- Genus: †Regalerpeton; Zhang et al., 2009

Species
- R. weichangensis Zhang et al., 2009 (type)

Extinct genus of salamanders

Regalerpeton is an extinct genus of salamander known from the Early Cretaceous of Huajiying Formation, China. It was first named by Guilin Zhang, Yuan Wang, Marc E.H. Jones and Susan E. Evans in 2009 and the type species is Regalerpeton weichangensis.
