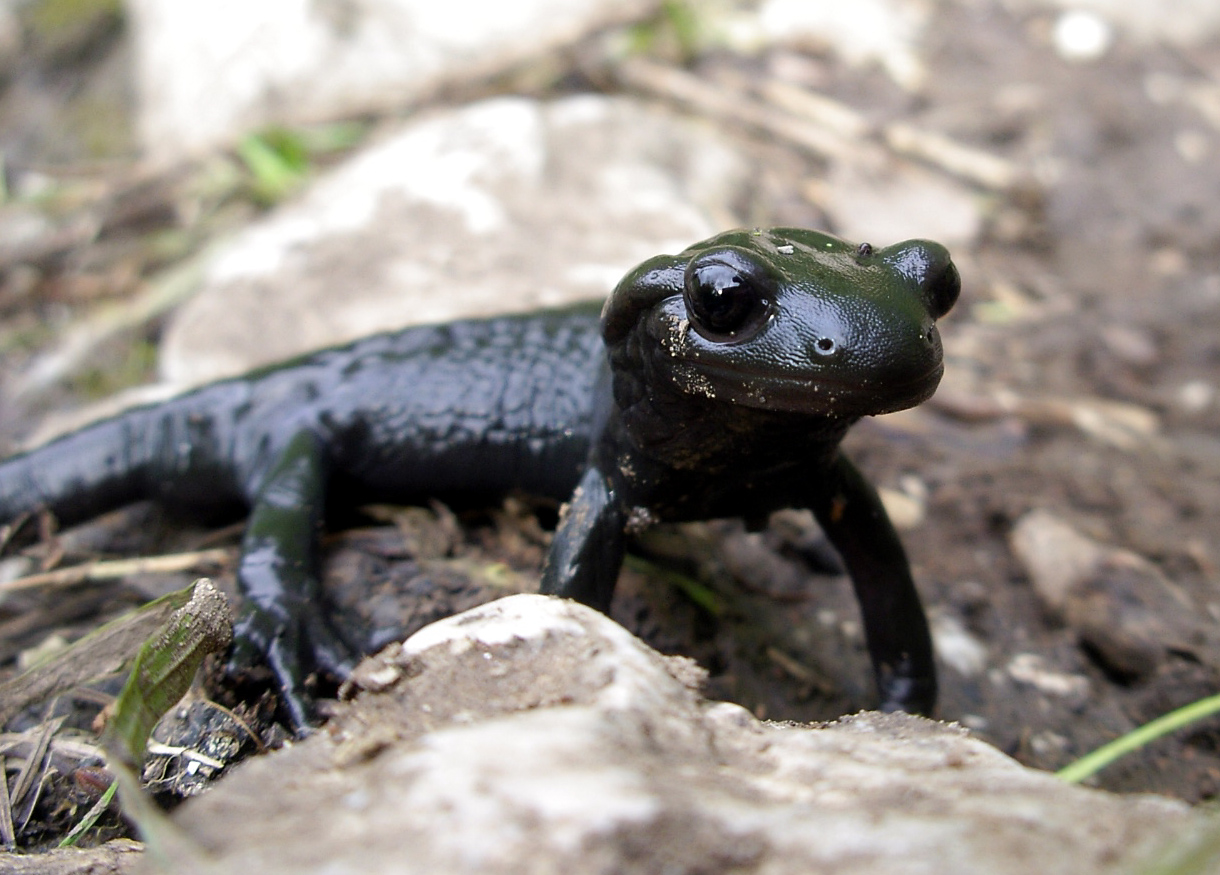
- Alpine salamander (Salamandra atra)

Scientific classification
- Kingdom: Animalia
- Phylum: Chordata
- Class: Amphibia
- Order: Urodela
- Suborder: Salamandroidea; Fitzinger, 1826

Families
- †Beiyanerpeton; †Qinglongtriton; Ambystomatidae; Amphiumidae; †Batrachosauroididae?; Plethodontidae; Proteidae; Rhyacotritonidae; Salamandridae; Dicamptodontidae

= Salamandroidea =

Salamandroidea Temporal range: Late Jurassic - Present, 157–0 Ma

Suborder of salamanders

The Salamandroidea are a suborder of salamanders, referred to as advanced salamanders. The members of the suborder are found worldwide except for Antarctica, sub-Saharan Africa, and Oceania. They differ from suborder Cryptobranchoidea as the angular and prearticular bones in their lower jaws are fused, their trunk ribs are bicapitate, and all members use internal fertilization. The female is fertilized by means of a spermatophore, a sperm-containing cap placed by the male in her cloaca. The sperm is stored in spermathecae on the roof of the cloaca until it is needed at the time of oviposition.

The earliest known salamandroid fossils remain contested. Some studies suggest that the earliest salamandroids are represented by specimens of the species Beiyanerpeton jianpingensis and Qinglongtriton gangouensis from the Tiaojishan Formation of Inner Mongolia, China, dated to the Late Jurassic about 157 million years ago. Alternative analyses suggest that Beiyanerpeton jianpingensis and Qinglongtriton gangouensis are stem salamanders and that the oldest known certain salamandroid is Valdotriton gracilis from the Early Cretaceous of Spain, about 127 Ma.
