= Wang Yuan (palaeontologist) =

Chinese paleontologist

Wang Yuan (Chinese: 王原) is a Chinese paleontologist who has served as director of the Paleozoological Museum of China (PMC) since 2004. This natural history museum is affiliated to the Institute of Vertebrate Paleontology and Paleoanthropology (IVPP) of the Chinese Academy of Sciences (CAS).

Wang graduated from Peking University in 1991 and received his master's degree from the University of Kansas. He earned his Ph.D. from the University of Chinese Academy of Sciences and IVPP in 2002. His doctoral advisor was Zhang Miman.

Wang is a Research Professor at IVPP and graduate school of the Chinese Academy of Sciences, with research work mainly on fossil amphibians and lizards.
