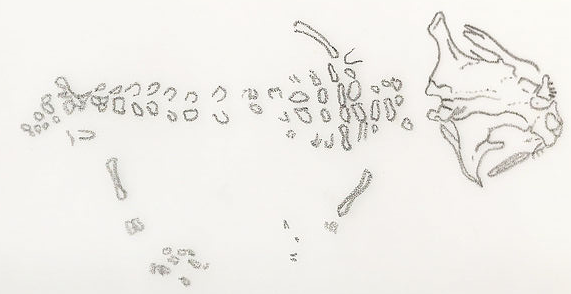
- Sketch of the holotype
- Life restoration

Scientific classification
- Kingdom: Animalia
- Phylum: Chordata
- Class: Amphibia
- Clade: Caudata
- Family: †Triassuridae; Ivakhnenko, 1978
- Genus: †Triassurus; Ivakhnenko, 1978
- Species: †T. sixtelae

Binomial name
- †Triassurus sixtelae Ivakhnenko, 1978

= Triassurus =

Triassurus Temporal range: Late Triassic, ~235–222 Ma

Extinct genus of salamanders

Triassurus is an extinct genus of amphibian, and the oldest member of Caudata (salamanders and close relatives). It is known from the Middle to Upper Triassic (Ladinian-Carnian) aged Madygen Formation in Kyrgyzstan. The type species is T. sixtelae.

== Description ==
The holotype specimen is a partial and poorly preserved skeleton (PIN-2584/10), including the skull. Holotype specimen had tiny skull just 3.8 mm (0.15 in) long, but it was probably a larva: the neural arches of the vertebrae were still paired and no vertebral centers show any degree of ossification. The skull closely resembles that of current salamanders, especially as regards the long space in the joint of the maxillary bones and the lack of bone connection between the pterygoid and the maxilla. There were about 20 presacral vertebrae, while the legs were small. In 2020, a more complete adult specimen (FG 596/V/20) with 11 mm (0.43 in) long skull was described.

== Classification ==
Triassurus was first described in 1978, based on a fossil found in the Madygen Formation in Kyrgyzstan. The bizarre planatory reptiles Sharovipteryx and Longisquama were also found in the same formation. Triassurus was initially described as the oldest salamander, based mainly on the characteristics of the skull. Some vertebral characteristics, in reality, would lead not only to primitive salamanders such as Hynobius but also to the larval forms of frogs and to the temnospondyls. Furthermore, the cheek area is similar to branchiosaurs. In any case, Triassurus remains the most salamander-like Triassic amphibian fossil. In 2020 Triassurus was definitely determined to a caudatan, based on four apomorphies shared with salamanders: "parasphenoid shape and dorsal surface, with a V-shaped anterior depression, an unpaired posteromedial crest, and a radial arrangement of furrows; parietal not plate-like and rectangular but L-shaped; squamosal forming a straight transverse strut with slightly expanded lateral end and well-expanded medial end, without squamosal embayment; and straight scapula with expanded ends". A redescription additionally recovered Triassurus with an unresolved trichotomy with early urodeles and the crown group Caudata, pushing urodele record back approximately 60-74 million years. In 2022 another phylogenetic analysis, that included members of Dissorophoidea, caecilians, frogs, as well as both living and fossil salamanders, recovered Triassurus as a stem-group caudatan, outside the crown group of modern salamanders.
