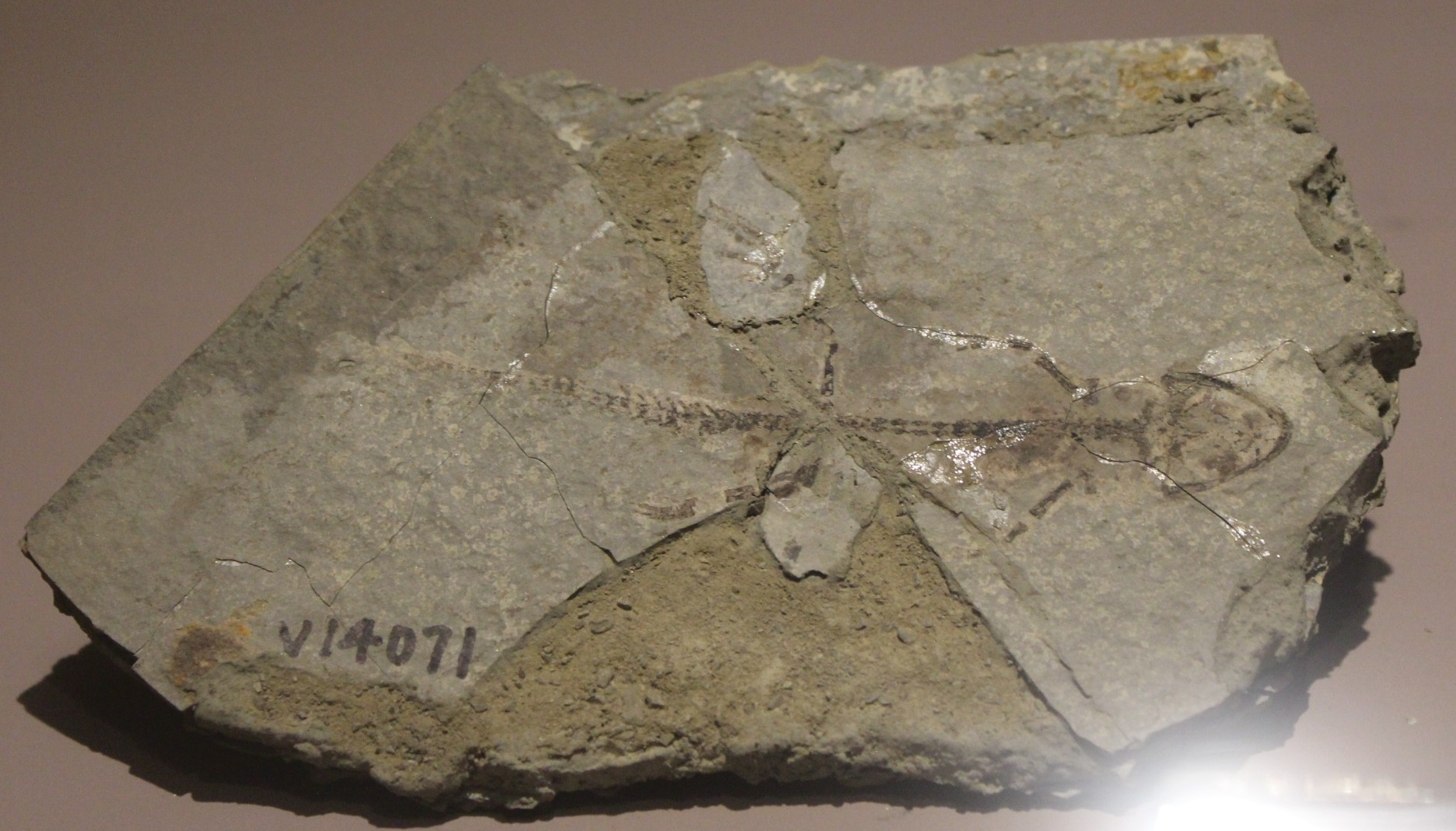
- L. zhongjiani specimen IVPP V14071, Paleozoological Museum of China

Scientific classification
- Kingdom: Animalia
- Phylum: Chordata
- Class: Amphibia
- Clade: Caudata
- Genus: †Liaoxitriton; Dong & Wang, 1998

Type species
- †Liaoxitriton zhongjiani Dong & Wang, 1998

= Liaoxitriton =

Liaoxitriton Temporal range: Early Cretaceous (early Aptian) 124 Ma

Extinct genus of salamanders

Liaoxitriton is an extinct genus of salamanders from the Early Cretaceous of China. It contains one species, L. zhongjiani, from the Aptian aged Yixian Formation. A second species, L. daohugouensis from the Middle/Late Jurassic Tiaojishan Formation, was moved to the genus Neimengtriton in 2021 after a number of studies noted morphological differences between the two genera.
