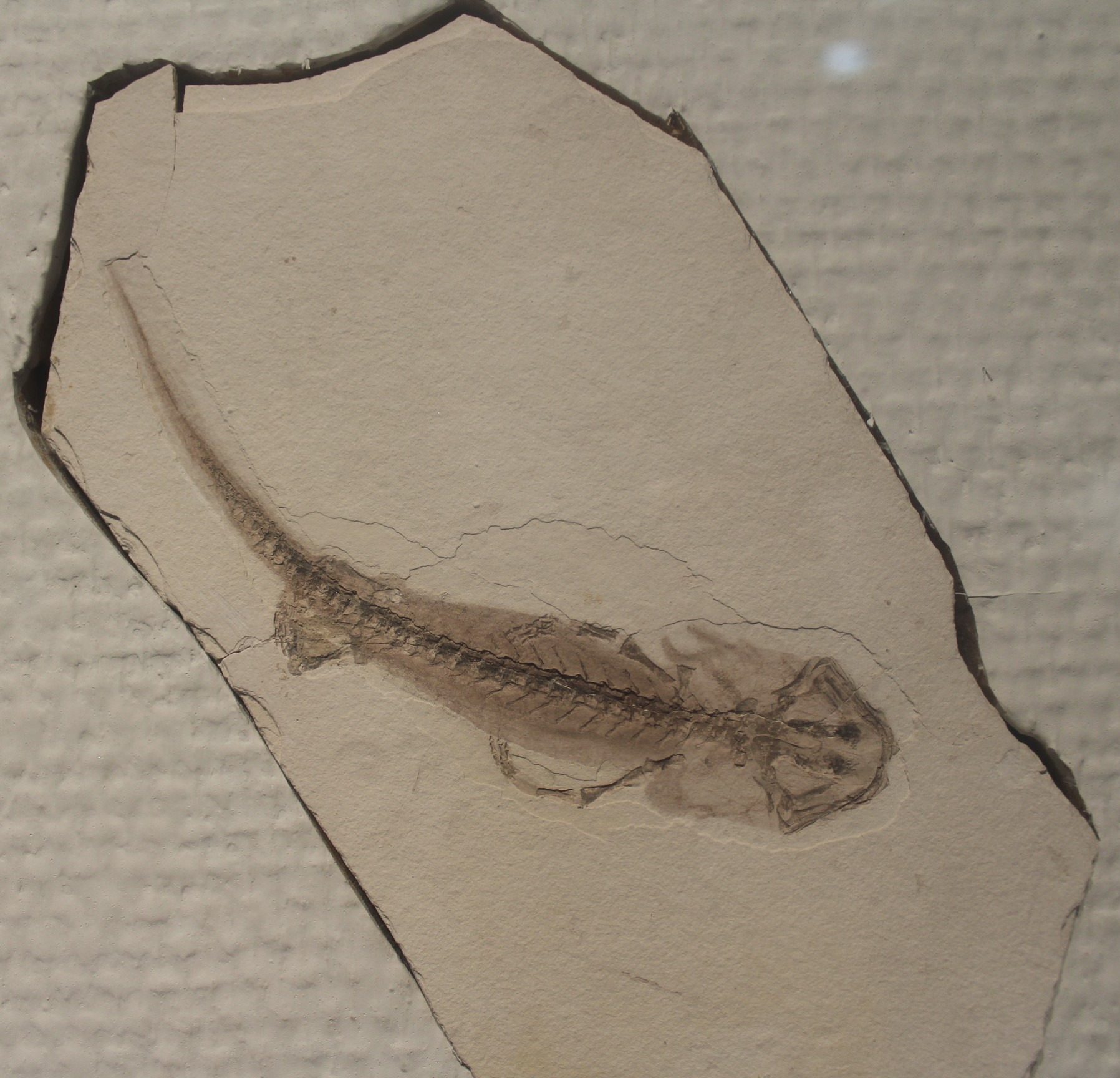
- Fossil specimen, Geological Museum of China

Scientific classification
- Kingdom: Animalia
- Phylum: Chordata
- Class: Amphibia
- Order: Urodela
- Suborder: Cryptobranchoidea
- Genus: †Jeholotriton; Wang, 2000

Type species
- †Jeholotriton paradoxus Wang, 2000

= Jeholotriton =

Jeholotriton Temporal range: Middle or Late Jurassic, 164 Ma

Extinct genus of salamanders

Jeholotriton is a genus of primitive salamander from the Daohugou Beds (possibly dating to the late Jurassic period) near Daohugou village of Inner Mongolia, China.

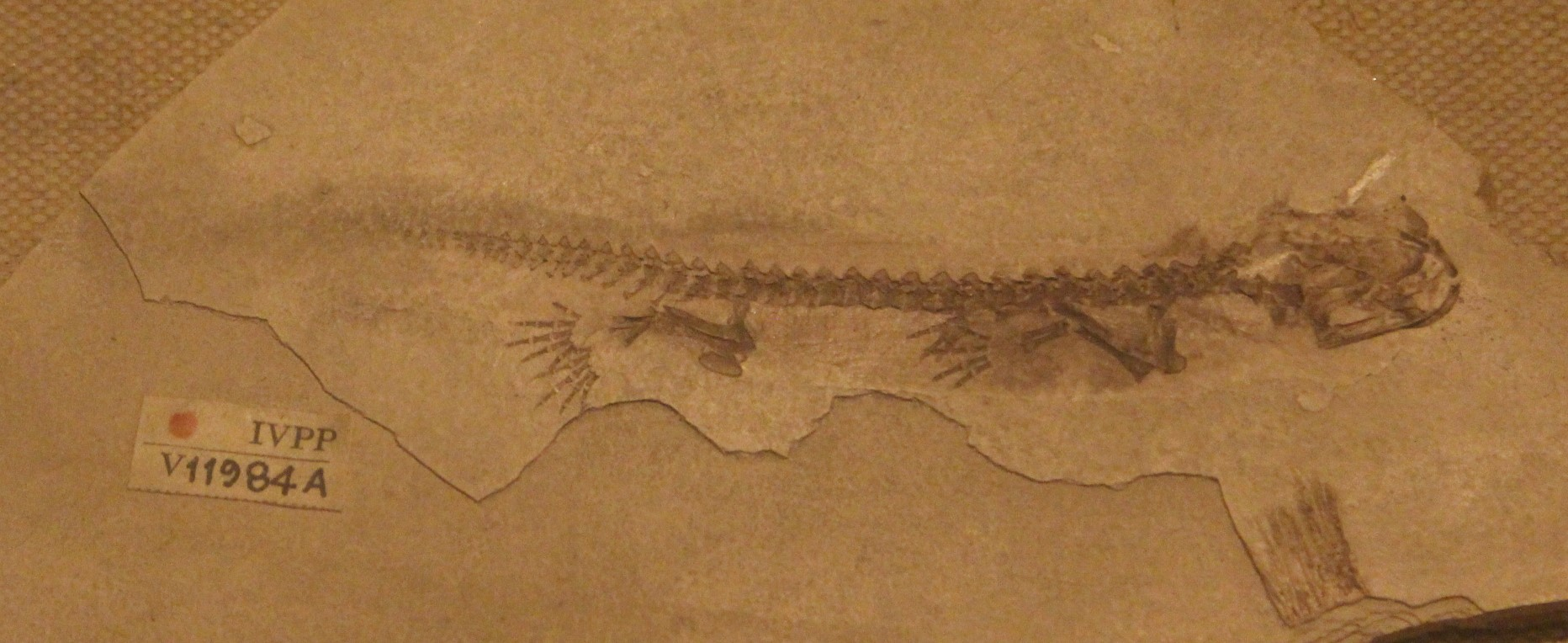
Paratype (IVPP V11984), Paleozoological Museum of China

Wang Yuan from the Institute of Vertebrate Paleontology and Paleoanthropology of the Chinese Academy of Sciences first described the species in 2000. In 2005, he presented a full description in the Journal of Vertebrate Paleontology along with C. S. Rose from James Madison University, United States.

The genus name "Jehol-" refers to Jehol Biota, which flourished during the Early Cretaceous in northeastern China. The original naming paper (Wang, 2000) regarded the salamander a member of the biota, but recent studies reveals this fossil-bearing Daohugou Beds is lower, Middle/Late Jurassic in age. The specific name "paradoxus" refers to the strange skull morphology of the animal.

== Classification ==
A phylogenetic analysis by Wang and S.E. Evans in 2006 found that Jeholotriton is a possible sister taxon to Pangerpeton, a short-bodied salamander from an adjacent locality in Lingyuan, Liaoning, strata comparable to the Daohugou Beds. These two taxa are close to the base of crown−group Urodela (modern salamanders), either just outside it or just within.

== See also ==
- Prehistoric amphibian
- List of prehistoric amphibians
