= Beiyanerpeton =

Beiyanerpeton Temporal range: Late Jurassic 157 Ma

Scientific classification
- Kingdom: Animalia
- Phylum: Chordata
- Class: Amphibia
- Order: Urodela
- Suborder: Salamandroidea
- Genus: †Beiyanerpeton; Gao and Shubin, 2012

Type species
- †Beiyanerpeton jianpingensis Gao and Shubin, 2012

Extinct genus of salamanders

Beiyanerpeton is an extinct monospecific genus of salamandroid amphibians known from the Late Jurassic of western Liaoning, China. It contains a single species, Beiyanerpeton jianpingensis. Alternative analyses suggest that Beiyanerpeton jianpingensis is a stem salamander and not a salamandroid.

== Discovery ==
Beiyanerpeton is known from the holotype specimen PKUP V0601, an almost complete and articulated skeleton exposed in ventral view. Several unnumbered specimens, PKUP V0602-0606, are also referred to Beiyanerpeton jianpingensis, and consist of articulated cranial and postcranial skeletons. The type fossil was collected at Guancaishan, near Jianping in the Liaoning Province, from the Tiaojishan Formation (also known as the Lanqi Formation), dating to the Oxfordian age of the Jurassic period, around 157 million years ago.

== Etymology ==
Beiyanerpeton was first described and named by Ke-Qin Gao and Neil Shubin in 2012, and the type species is Beiyanerpeton jianpingensis. The generic name is derived from Chinese "Beiyan" meaning northern Yan State, and from Greek herpeton, "creeping animal". The specific name honors Jianping, a county town which is close to the type locality of Beiyanerpeton.
