= 2000 in paleontology =

Paleontology or palaeontology is the study of prehistoric life forms on Earth through the examination of plant and animal fossils. This includes the study of body fossils, tracks (ichnites), burrows, cast-off parts, fossilised feces (coprolites), palynomorphs and chemical residues. Because humans have encountered fossils for millennia, paleontology has a long history both before and after becoming formalized as a science. This article records significant discoveries and events related to paleontology that occurred or were published in the year 2000.

== Plants ==
=== Angiosperms ===
Name	Novelty	Status	Authors	Age	Unit	Location	Notes	Images
Chaneya	Gen et 2 comb nov	Valid	Wang & Manchester	Late Eocene	Florissant Formation	USA	A genus of uncertain affiliation The type species is Porana tenuis (1908); Also includes P. kokangensis (1939)	Chaneya tenuis
Palaeocarpinus sikhotealinensis	Sp nov	Valid	Akhmetiev & Manchester	Latest Eocene or Earliest Oligocene	Kizi Group; Buoy Bay Member	Russia	A betulaceous fruit	

== Arthropods ==
=== Arachnids ===
Name	Novelty	Status	Authors	Age	Unit	Location	Notes	Images
Baltocteniza	Gen et sp nov	Valid	Eskov & Zonstein	Early Eocene (Miocene)	Baltic amber	Europe	The type and only species is Baltocteniza kulickae	
Electrocteniza	Gen et sp nov	Valid	Eskov & Zonstein	Early Eocene (Miocene)	Baltic amber	Europe	The type and only species is Electrocteniza sadilenkoi	

=== Crustaceans ===
Name	Novelty	Status	Authors	Age	Unit	Location	Notes	Images
Tillocheles kaoriae	Sp nov	Valid	Yokoi & Karasawa	Cenomanian-Turonian	Yezo Group	Japan	A stenochirid	

=== Insects ===
Name	Novelty	Status	Authors	Age	Unit	Location	Notes	Images
Makarkiniidae	Fam nov	jr synonym	Martins-Neto	Aptian	Crato Formation	Brazil	A lacewing family, syn of Kalligrammatidae	
Neurosymploca? oligocenica	Sp nov	valid	Fernández-Rubio & Nel	Rupelian	Paleolake Céreste	France	A moth, possibly a species of Neurosymploca	Neurosymploca oligocenica

== Molluscs ==
=== Bivalves ===
Name	Novelty	Status	Authors	Age	Unit	Location	Notes	Images
Camyidae	fam nov	valid	Hinz-Schallreuter	Early Cambrian	Bornholm	Denmark	type and only genus Camya	

== Fishes ==
=== Newly named placoderms ===
Name	Novelty	Status	Authors	Age	Unit	Location	Notes	Images
Aleosteus	Gen et sp nov	Valid	Johnson, Elliott, & Wittke	Lower Devonian	Sevy Dolomite Formation, Nevada	USA	The type species is Aleosteus eganensis.	

=== Newly named cartilaginous fish ===
Name	Novelty	Status	Authors	Age	Unit	Location	Notes	Images
Debeerius	Gen et sp nov	Valid	Grogan & Lund	Carboniferous (late Chesterian)	Heath Formation	USA (Montana)	An early cartilaginous fish with an anatomy intermediate to the chimaeroid and selachian plans. The type species is D. ellefseni.	

== Amphibians ==
Name	Status	Authors	Age	Unit	Location	Notes	Images
Avitabatrachus	Valid	Baez; Trueb; Calvo	Middle Cretaceous	Candeleros Formation	Argentina	The type species is Avitabatrachus uliana.	
Banksiops	Valid	Warren; Mariscano				A replacement genus for Banksia Warren & Mariscano, 1998 preoccupied for arachnid Banksia Voigt & Oudermans, 1905.	
Jeholotriton	Valid	Wang	Early Cretaceous	Daohugou Bed Formation	China	The type species is Jeholotriton paradoxus.	
Rileymillerus	Valid	Bolt; Chatterjee	Upper Triassic	Cooper Canyon Formation	USA	The type species is Rileymillerus cosgriffi.	

== Ichthyosaurs ==
Name	Status	Authors	Age	Unit	Location	Notes	Images
Aegirosaurus	Valid	Bardet; Fernández	Upper Jurassic		Germany	The type species is Aegirosaurus leptospondylus.	
Callawayia	Valid	Maisch; Matzke	Upper Triassic	Pardonet Formation	Canada	A new genus for "Shastasaurus" neoscapularis.	
Guizhouichthyosaurus	Valid	Cao; Luo	Upper Triassic	Falang Formation	China	The type species is Guizhouichthyosaurus tangae.	
Phantomosaurus	Valid	Maisch; Matzke	Middle Triassic	Upper Muschelkalk Formation	Germany	A new genus for "Shastasaurus" neubigi.	

== Archosauromorphs ==
=== Newly named crurotarsans ===
Name	Status	Authors	Age	Unit	Location	Notes	Images
Adzhosuchus	Valid	Efimov; Gubin; Kurzanov	Late Jurassic	Shar Teg Beds	Mongolia	A basal crocodylomorph. The type species is Adzhosuchus fuscus.	
Kyasuchus	Valid	Efimov; Leshchinskiy	Early Cretaceous	Ilek Formation	Russia	A basal crocodilomorph. The type species is Kyasuchus saevi.	
Simosuchus	Valid	Buckley; Brochu; Krause; Pol	Late Cretaceous	Maevarano Formation	Madagascar	A notosuchian. The type species is Simosuchus clarki.	
Stolokrosuchus	Valid	Larrson; Gabo	Early Cretaceous	El Rhaz Formation	Niger	A neosuchian. The type species is Stolokrosuchus lapparenti.	

=== Newly named dinosaurs ===
Data courtesy of George Olshevsky's dinosaur genera list.

Name	Status	Authors	Discovery year	Age	Unit	Location	Notes	Images
Bambiraptor	Valid	Burnham; Derstler; et al. (Note: Burnham, Derstler, Phillip Currie, Robert Bakker, Zhou Z., John Ostrom.)			Two Medicine Formation	USA	A very bird-like two foot long dromaeosaurid. May be a juvenile Saurornitholestes.	Bambiraptor Charonosaurus Fukuiraptor Graciliceratops Microraptor Nanyangosaurus Nomingia Pyroraptor Sauroposeidon
Byronosaurus	Valid	Mark Norell; Makovicky; Clark			Djadochta Formation	Mongolia	A five foot long troodontid. Mysteriously, skulls of extremely small juveniles have been recovered from an oviraptorosaur nest. This may be evidence of brood parasitism or predator-prey relationships between the two species.	Bambiraptor Charonosaurus Fukuiraptor Graciliceratops Microraptor Nanyangosaurus Nomingia Pyroraptor Sauroposeidon
Caudipteryx dongi	Valid	Zhou Zhonghe; Wang Xiaolin		Early Cretaceous	Lower Yixian Formation	China	A caudipterygid oviraptorosaur	Bambiraptor Charonosaurus Fukuiraptor Graciliceratops Microraptor Nanyangosaurus Nomingia Pyroraptor Sauroposeidon
Charonosaurus	Valid	Godefroit; Zan; Jin L.			Yuliangze Formation	China	A 13 m (42.5 ft) long Parasaurolophus-like lambeosaur.	Bambiraptor Charonosaurus Fukuiraptor Graciliceratops Microraptor Nanyangosaurus Nomingia Pyroraptor Sauroposeidon
Chuanjiesaurus	Valid	Fang; Pang; et al. (Note: Fang, Pang, Lu, Zhang Z., Pan, Wang Y., Li X. K., Cheng Z.)			Chuanjie Formation	China	A mamenchisaurid.	Bambiraptor Charonosaurus Fukuiraptor Graciliceratops Microraptor Nanyangosaurus Nomingia Pyroraptor Sauroposeidon
Fukuiraptor	Valid	Azuma; Phillip Currie			Kitadani Formation	Japan	A neovenatorid known only from juvenile specimens.	Bambiraptor Charonosaurus Fukuiraptor Graciliceratops Microraptor Nanyangosaurus Nomingia Pyroraptor Sauroposeidon
"Ginnareemimus"	Nomen nudum	Kaneko			Sao Khua Formation	Thailand	Formally named Kinnareemimus in 2009 in paleontology.	Bambiraptor Charonosaurus Fukuiraptor Graciliceratops Microraptor Nanyangosaurus Nomingia Pyroraptor Sauroposeidon
Glyptodontopelta	Valid	Ford			Ojo Alamo Sandstone	USA	Named after the armored mammal Glyptodon.	Bambiraptor Charonosaurus Fukuiraptor Graciliceratops Microraptor Nanyangosaurus Nomingia Pyroraptor Sauroposeidon
Graciliceratops	Valid	Paul Sereno			Sheeregeen Gashoon Formation	Mongolia	Primitive ceratopsian. Only a partial skeleton has been found.	Bambiraptor Charonosaurus Fukuiraptor Graciliceratops Microraptor Nanyangosaurus Nomingia Pyroraptor Sauroposeidon
Huabeisaurus	Valid	Pang; Cheng Z.			Huiquanpu Formation	China	Opisthocoelicaudia-like titanosaurid.	Bambiraptor Charonosaurus Fukuiraptor Graciliceratops Microraptor Nanyangosaurus Nomingia Pyroraptor Sauroposeidon
"Iguanoides"	Nomen nudum; synonym of Iguanodon	Conybeare vide: Cadbury					Junior synonym of Iguanodon.	Bambiraptor Charonosaurus Fukuiraptor Graciliceratops Microraptor Nanyangosaurus Nomingia Pyroraptor Sauroposeidon
Ilokelesia	Valid	Rodolfo Coria; Salgado			Rio Limay Formation	Argentina	A primitive abelisaur who name is derived from "flesh lizard" in Mapuche.	Bambiraptor Charonosaurus Fukuiraptor Graciliceratops Microraptor Nanyangosaurus Nomingia Pyroraptor Sauroposeidon
Isanosaurus	Valid	Buffetaut; Suteethorn; et al. (Note: Buffetaut, Suteethorn, Cuny, Tong, Le Loeuff, Khansubha, Jongautchariyakul.)			Nam Phong Formation	Thailand	A small, 6.5 metres (21 ft) long sauropod.	Bambiraptor Charonosaurus Fukuiraptor Graciliceratops Microraptor Nanyangosaurus Nomingia Pyroraptor Sauroposeidon
Jeholosaurus	Valid	Xu Xing; Wang X.; You			Yixian Formation	China	A 71.1 centimetres (28.0 in) long hypsilophodont.	Bambiraptor Charonosaurus Fukuiraptor Graciliceratops Microraptor Nanyangosaurus Nomingia Pyroraptor Sauroposeidon
Microraptor	Valid	Xu Xing; Zhou Z.; Wang X.			Jiufotang Formation	China	A tiny "four-winged" dromaeosaurid.	Bambiraptor Charonosaurus Fukuiraptor Graciliceratops Microraptor Nanyangosaurus Nomingia Pyroraptor Sauroposeidon
Nanyangosaurus	Valid	Xu Xing; Zhao X.; et al. (Note: Xu Xing, Zhao X., Lü, Huang W., Li Z., Dong Zhiming.)			Sangping Formation	China	A hadrosauroid.	Bambiraptor Charonosaurus Fukuiraptor Graciliceratops Microraptor Nanyangosaurus Nomingia Pyroraptor Sauroposeidon
Nomingia	Valid	Rinchen Barsbold; Halszka Osmólska; et al. (Note: Rinchen Barsbold, Halszka Osmólska, Watabe, Phillip Currie, Tsogtbaatar.)			Beds of Bugeen Tsav	Mongolia	The first non-avian dinosaur known to have a pygostyle at the end of its tail. In life this structure probably supported a fan of feathers.	Bambiraptor Charonosaurus Fukuiraptor Graciliceratops Microraptor Nanyangosaurus Nomingia Pyroraptor Sauroposeidon
Nqwebasaurus	Valid	de Klerk; Forster; et al. (Note: de Klerk, Forster, Sampson, Chinsamy, Ross.)			Kirkwood Formation	South Africa	The earliest known coelurosaur from Gondwana, the type specimen was a three foot long juvenile with preserved gastroliths in its stomach.	Bambiraptor Charonosaurus Fukuiraptor Graciliceratops Microraptor Nanyangosaurus Nomingia Pyroraptor Sauroposeidon
"Ponerosteus"	Nomen dubium; possibly non-dinosaurian	George Olshevsky,					A dubious taxon whose name means "useless bone" to reflect the low quality of the material, which had fueled taxonomic confusion.	Bambiraptor Charonosaurus Fukuiraptor Graciliceratops Microraptor Nanyangosaurus Nomingia Pyroraptor Sauroposeidon
Pyroraptor	Valid	Allain; Philippe Taquet			Grès à Reptiles	France	A dromaeosaurid known from a single specimen.	Bambiraptor Charonosaurus Fukuiraptor Graciliceratops Microraptor Nanyangosaurus Nomingia Pyroraptor Sauroposeidon
Rocasaurus	Valid	Salgado; Azpilicueta			Allen Formation	Argentina	A small, 8 meter long titanosaur.	Bambiraptor Charonosaurus Fukuiraptor Graciliceratops Microraptor Nanyangosaurus Nomingia Pyroraptor Sauroposeidon
"Saltriosaurus"	Nomen nudum	Dal Sasso					An Allosaurus-like theropod estimated to be 8 meters (26 ft) long. Only ten percent of its skeleton is known.	Bambiraptor Charonosaurus Fukuiraptor Graciliceratops Microraptor Nanyangosaurus Nomingia Pyroraptor Sauroposeidon
Sauroposeidon	Valid	Wedel; Cifelli; Sanders			Antlers Formation	USA	A gigantic brachiosaur with an estimated length of up to 34 m (112 ft) and a mass of 50–60 t (55–66 short tons). It is known from four neck vertebrae.	Bambiraptor Charonosaurus Fukuiraptor Graciliceratops Microraptor Nanyangosaurus Nomingia Pyroraptor Sauroposeidon
Tendaguria	Valid	Jose Bonaparte; Heinrich; Wild			Tendaguru Formation	Tanzania	A 20 meters (66 ft) long sauropod.	Bambiraptor Charonosaurus Fukuiraptor Graciliceratops Microraptor Nanyangosaurus Nomingia Pyroraptor Sauroposeidon

=== Newly named birds ===
Name	Novelty	Status	Authors	Age	Unit	Location	Notes	Images
Alca stewarti	Valid	Sp. nov.	James W. R. Martin Cyril A. Walker Richard H. C. Bonser Gareth J. Dyke	Early Pliocene	Kattendijk Sands Formation	Belgium: East Flanders	An Alcidae.	
Ameripodius alexis	Valid	Sp. nov.	Cécile Mourer-Chauviré	Early Miocene	MN 2a	France	A Quercymegapodiidae Mourer-Chauviré, 1992.	
Brachypteracias langrandi	Valid	Sp. nov.	Steven M. Goodman	Holocene	Ampoza	Madagascar	A Brachypteraciidae.	
Cerestenia pulchrapenna	Valid	Gen. nov. et Sp. nov.	Gerald Mayr	Middle Oligocene	MP 23	France	Possibly a stem Turnicidae, this is the type species of the new genus.	
Cygnus verae	Valid	Sp. nov.	Zlatozar N. Boev	Early Pliocene	MN 14, Ruscinian	Bulgaria	An Anatidae.	
Eocoracias brachyptera	Valid	Gen. nov. et Sp. nov.	Gerald Mayr Cécile Mourer-Chauviré	Middle Eocene	Messel pit, MP 11	Germany: Hessen	The type species of the new genus, placed in the new family Eocoraciidae G. Mayr et Mourer-Chauviré, 2000.	
Fratercula dowi	Valid	Sp. nov.	Daniel A. Guthrie Howell W. Thomas George L. Kennedy	Late Pleistocene	Late Rancholabrean, San Nicolas Island	USA: California	An Alcidae.	
Frigidafons babaheydariensis	Valid	Sp. nov.	Dieter S. Peters Ali Hamedani	Early Oligocene	Rupelian	Iran	A Diomedeoididae Fischer, 1985, transferred to Diomedeoides Fischer, 1985 by Mayr, Peters & Rietschel, 2002 and to Rupelornis van Beneden, 1871 by Mayr & Smith, 2012.	
Gallirallus huiatua	Valid	Sp. nov.	David W. Steadman Trevor H. Worthy Atholl J. Anderson Richard Walter	Holocene	Prehistoric	Niue	A Rallidae.	
Geranopterus milneedwardsi	Valid	Sp. nov.	Gerald Mayr Cécile Mourer-Chauviré	Eocene or Oligocene	Phosphotites du Quercy, MP 16–28	France	A Geranopteridae Mayr & Mourer-Chauviré, 2000.	
Jibeinia luanhera	Valid	Gen. nov. et Sp. nov.	Lianhai Hou	Early Cretaceous	Huajiying Formation	China	An Enantiornithes, described in 1997 but the name was a labelname, so a Nomen Nudum, in 2000 Hou gave a short description in the Picture Book of Chinese Fossil Birds, making the name valid.	
Longipteryx chaoyangensis	Gen. nov. et Sp. nov.	Valid	Fucheng Zhang Zhou Zhonghe Hou Lianhan Gu Gang	Early Cretaceous	Jiufotang Formation	China	An Enantiornithes Walker, 1981. The type species of the new genus.	
Megapodius amissus	Valid	Sp. nov.	Trevor H. Worthy	Holocene	Cave deposits, Viti Levu	Fiji	A Megapodiidae.	
Megavitiornis altirostris	Valid	Gen. nov. et Sp. nov.	Trevor H. Worthy	Holocene	Cave deposits, Viti Levu	Fiji	A Megapodiidae, the type species of the new genus.	
Messelirrisor grandis	Valid	Sp. nov.	Gerald Mayr	Early Middle Eocene	Messel pit MN 11	Germany: Hessen	An Upupiformes, Laurillardiidae Harrison, 1979.	
Nycticorax kalavikai	Valid	Sp. nov.	David W. Steadman Trevor H. Worthy Atholl J. Anderson Richard Walter	Holocene	Prehistoric	Niue	An Ardeidae.	
Oligocolius brevitarsus	Valid	Gen. nov. et Sp. nov.	Gerald Mayr	Middle Oligocene	MP 23-24	Germany: Baden-Württemberg	A stem Coliidae.	
Paraortygoides messelensis	Valid	Gen. nov. et Sp. nov.	Gerald Mayr	Middle Eocene	Messel pit, MP 11	Germany: Hessen	A Gallinuloididae Lucas, 1900.	
Phirriculus pinicola	Valid	Gen. nov. et Sp. nov.	Jirí Mlíkovský Ursula B. Göhlich	Early Miocene	MN 2a and MN 3	France; Germany: Bavaria	A Phoeniculidae.	
Porzana piercei	Valid	Sp. nov.	Storrs L. Olson David B. Wingate	Middle Pleistocene	Government Quarry	Bermuda	A Rallidae.	
Potamornis skutchi	Valid	Gen. nov et Sp. nov.	Andrzej Elzanowski Gregory S. Paul Thomas A. Stidham	Late Cretaceous	Late Maastrichtian	USA: Wyoming	A Hesperornithiformas.	
Protopteryx fengningensis	Gen. nov. et Sp. nov.	Valid	Zhang Fucheng Zhou Zhonghe	Early Cretaceous	Huajiying Formation	China	An Enanthornithes. This is the type species of the new genus.	
Pulchapollia gracilis	Valid	Gen. nov et Sp. nov.	Gareth J. Dyke Joanne H. Cooper	Early Eocene	Ypresian, MP 8, London Clay	UK: England	A Psittaciformes, Halcyornithidae Harrison et Walker, 1972, this is the type species of the new genus.	
Qiluornis taishanensis	Valid	Gen. nov et Sp. nov.	Lian-Hai Hou Zhong-He Zhou Fu-Cheng Zhang Jun-De Li	Miocene	Shanwang Formation	China	An Accipitridae, this is the type species of the new genus.	
Rallus ibycus	Valid	Sp. nov.	Storrs L. Olson David B. Wingate	Middle Pleistocene	Government Quarry	Bermuda	A Rallidae.	
Salmila robusta	Valid	Gen. nov. et Sp. nov.	Gerald Mayr	Middle Eocene	Messel pit, MP 11	Germany: Hessen	A Gruiformes, Salmilidae Mayr, 2002, this is the type species of the new genus.	
Serudaptus pohli	Valid	Gen. nov. et Sp. nov.	Gerald Mayr	Middle Eocene	Messel pit, MP 11	Germany: Hessen	A Psittaciformes, Halcyornithidae Harrison et Walker, 1972, this is the type species of the new genus.	
Turnipax dissipata	Valid	Gen. nov. et Sp. nov.	Gerald Mayr	Early-Middle Oligocene	MP 21-25	France	Possibly a stem Turnicidae, this is the type species of the new genus.	
Tynskya eocaena	Valid	Gen. nov. et Sp. nov.	Gerald Mayr	Early Eocene	Green River Formation MP 8, London Clay	USA: Wyoming; UK: England	A Messelasturidae Mayr, 2005, this is the type species of the new genus.	

=== Newly named pterosaurs ===
Name	Status	Authors	Age	Unit	Location	Notes	Images
Domeykodactylus	Valid	Martill; Frey; Diaz; Bell	Early Cretaceous	Santa Ana Formation	Chile	A pterodactyloid. The type species is Domeykodactylus ceciliae.	
Anhanguera piscator	Valid	Kellner; Tomida	Early Cretaceous	Santana Formation	Brazil	A pterodactyloid. Reclassified in 2006 to the genus Coloborhynchus.	

== Synapsids ==
=== Non-mammalian ===
Name	Status	Authors	Age	Unit	Location	Notes	Images
Australobarbarus	Valid	Kurkin	Upper Permian	Sokolki Faunal Assemblage	Russia	A dicynodont. Two species are described Australobarbarus kotelnitshi (type) and A. platycephalus.	
Charruodon	Valid	Abdala; Ribeiro	Upper Triassic	Santa Maria Formation	Brazil	A cynodont. The type species is Charruodon tetracuspidatus.	
Chlynovia	Valid	Tatarinov	Upper Permian	Sokolki Faunal Assemblage	Russia	A therocephalian. The type species is Chlynovia serridentatus.	
Dadadon	Valid	Flynn; Parrish; Rakotosamimanana; Ranivoharimanana; Simpson; Wyss	Middle-Upper Triassic	Makay Formation	Madagascar	A eucynodont. The type species is Dadadon isaloi.	
Menadon	Valid	Flynn; Parrish; Rakotosamimanana; Ranivoharimanana; Simpson; Wyss	Middle-Upper Triassic	Makay Formation	Madagascar	A eucynodont. The type species is Menodon besairiei.	
Nikkasaurus	Valid	Ivakhnenko	Upper Permian	Mezen Faunal Assemblage	Russia	A nikkasaurid. The type species is Nikkasaurus tatarinovi.	
Reiszia	Valid	Ivakhnenko	Upper Permian	Mezen Faunal Assemblage	Russia	A nikkasaurid. Two species are described Reiszia gubini (type) and R. tippula.	
Scalopodontes	Valid	Tatarinov	Upper Permian	Sokolki Faunal Assemblage	Russia	A theriocephalian. The type species is Scalopodontes kotelnichi	
Suchogorgon	Valid	Tatarinov	Upper Permian	Sokolki Faunal Assemblage	Russia	A gorgonopsid. The type species is Suchogorgon golubevi.	
Vivaxosaurus	Valid	Kalandadze; Kurkin	Upper Permian	Sokolki Faunal Assemblage	Russia	A dicynodont. The type species is Vivaxosaurus permicus.	

=== Mammals ===
Name	Novelty	Status	Authors	Age	Unit	Location	Notes	Images
Arcius zbyszewskii	Sp nov	Valid	Estravís	Early Eocene	Silveirinha Formation	Portugal	A paromomyid	
Donrussellia lusitanica	Sp nov	Valid	Estravís	Early Eocene	Silveirinha Formation	Portugal	A notharctid	
Meldimys cardosoi	Sp nov	Jr synonym	Estravís	Early Eocene	Silveirinha Formation	Portugal	An ischyromyid rodent, reassigned to the genus Euromys in 1999.	

== See also ==
- 2000 in science

== Footnotes ==
=== Complete author list ===
As science becomes more collaborative, papers with large numbers of authors are becoming more common. To prevent the deformation of the tables, these footnotes list the contributors to papers that erect new genera and have many authors.
