= Alexander O. Averianov =

Russian palaeontologist

- Born: Alexander Olegovich Averianov; 1965 (age 60–61)
- Known for: Therapsid evolution
- Scientific career
- Fields: Palaeontology
- Thesis: Origin, evolution and phylogenetic system of lagomorphs (order Lagomorpha).

Alexander Olegovich Averianov is a Russian palaeontologist best known for his studies of therapsid evolution, particularly of mammaliamorphs.

== Career ==
Averianov graduated from Leningrad State University with a degree from the Department of Vertebrate Zoology in 1988. During his doctoral research, Averianov studied the evolution and phylogeny of lagomorphs. He has conducted fieldwork in Russia, Kazakhstan, Kyrgyzstan, and Uzbekistan. He is currently a member of the Society of Vertebrate Paleontology as well as the Paleontological Society and Theriological Society in Russia.

Below is a list of new taxa that Averianov has contributed to naming:

Year	Taxon	Authors
2023	Maocyon peregrinus gen. et sp. nov.	Averianov, Obraztsova, Danilov, & Jin
2022	Dzharaonyx eski gen. et sp. nov.	Averianov & Sues
2022	Ondogurvel alifanovi gen. et sp. nov.	Averianov & Lopatin
2021	Dzharatitanis kingi gen. et sp. nov.	Averianov & Sues
2021	Kansaignathus sogdianus gen. et sp. nov.	Averianov & Lopatin
2020	Abdarainurus barsboldi gen. et sp. nov.	Averianov & Lopatin
2019	Cryoharamiya tarda gen. et sp. nov.	Averianov, Martin, Lopatin, Skutschas, Schellhorn, Kolosov, & Vitenko
2018	Khorotherium yakutensis gen. et sp. nov.	Averianov, Martin, Lopatin, Skutschas, Schellhorn, Kolosov, & Vitenko
2018	Sangarotherium aquilonium gen. et sp. nov.	Averianov, Martin, Lopatin, Skutschas, Schellhorn, Kolosov, & Vitenko
2018	Volgatitan simbirskiensis gen. et sp. nov.	Averianov & Efimov
2018	Sibirotitan astrosacralis gen. et sp. nov.	Averianov, Ivantsov, Skutschas, Faingertz, & Leshchinskiy
2017	Tengrisaurus starkovi gen. et sp. nov.	Averianov & Skutchas
2017	Baidabatyr clivosus gen. et sp. nov.	Averianov, Lopatin, Skutschas, Ivantsov, Boitsova, & Kuzmin
2017	Cadurcodon maomingensis sp. nov.	Averianov, Danilov, Jin, & Wang
2016	Maofelis cantonensis gen. et sp. nov.	Averianov, Obraztsova, Danilov, Skutschas, & Jin
2012	Zhalmouzia bazhanovi gen. et sp. nov.	Averianov, Archibald, & Dyke
2007	Aralazhdarcho bostobensis gen. et sp. nov.	Averianov
