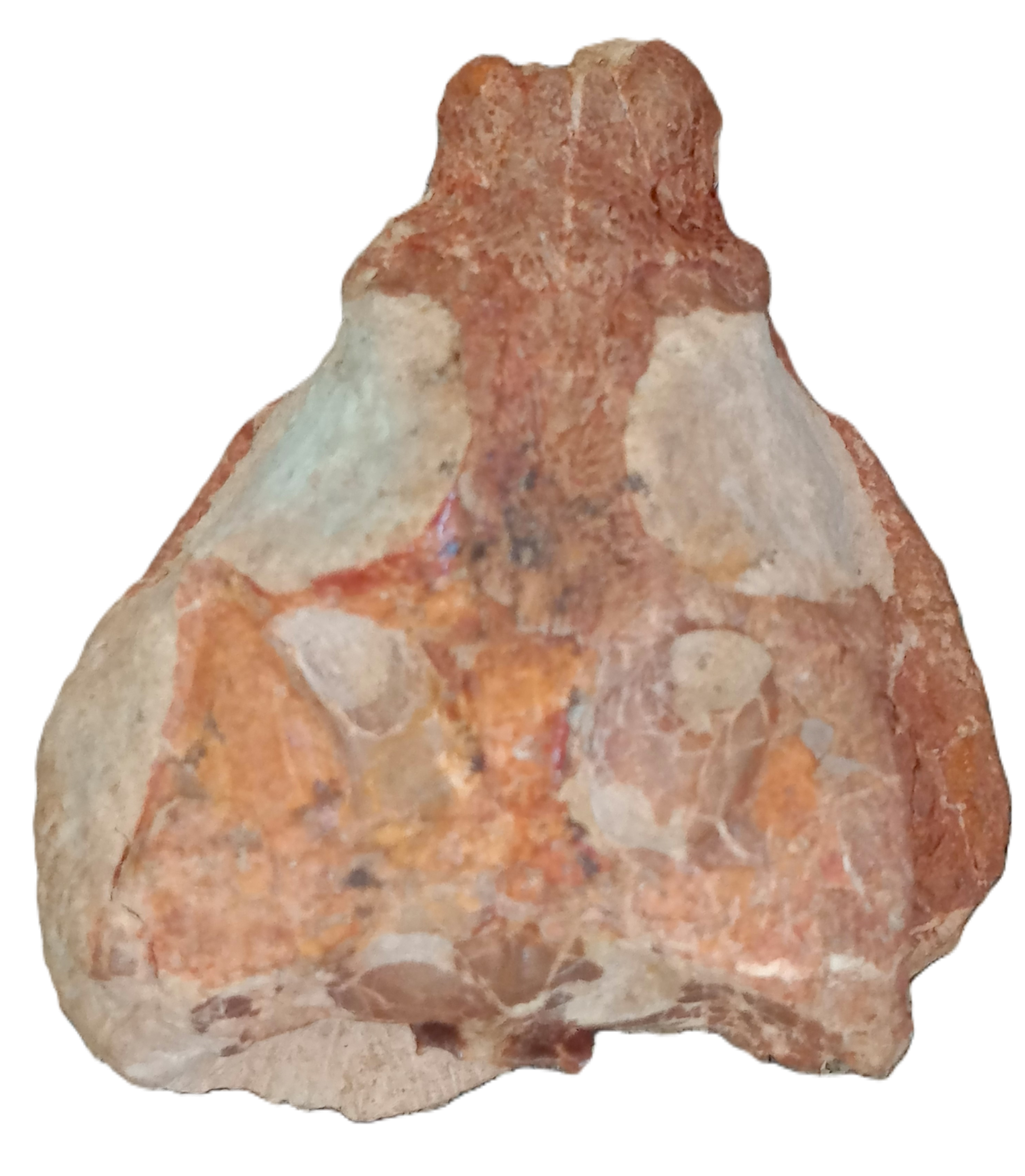
- Skull

Scientific classification
- Kingdom: Animalia
- Phylum: Chordata
- Class: Reptilia
- Clade: Pseudosuchia
- Clade: Crocodylomorpha
- Clade: Crocodyliformes
- Genus: †Tagarosuchus; Alifanov et al., 1999
- Species: †T. kulemzini

Binomial name
- †Tagarosuchus kulemzini Alifanov et al., 1999

= Tagarosuchus =

Tagarosuchus Temporal range: Early Cretaceous

Extinct genus of reptiles

Tagarosuchus is an extinct genus of Early Cretaceous protosuchian-grade crocodyliform. Fossils of Tagarosuchus have been found from southern Siberia, including a nearly complete skull found near the village of Shestakovo in Kemerovo Oblast. Tagarosuchus was named in 1999, with the type species being Tagarosuchus kulemzini. Remains have been recovered from the Aptian-Albian Ilek Formation.

== Paleoecology ==
A diverse vertebrate assemblage has been uncovered from the Shestakovo locality. Tagarosuchus would have coexisted with paramacellodid, scincomorphan, and xenosaurid lizards, the shartegosuchid crocodyliform Kyasuchus, the tritylodontid cynodont Xenocretosuchus, the triconodont mammal Gobiconodon, the ceratopsian dinosaur Psittacosaurus, troodontid theropod dinosaurs, and sauropods, all of which have been described from the locality in the past few decades.
