= Fossiomanus =

Fossiomanus Temporal range: Early Aptian, ~120 Ma

Scientific classification
- Kingdom: Animalia
- Phylum: Chordata
- Clade: Synapsida
- Clade: Therapsida
- Clade: Cynodontia
- Family: †Tritylodontidae
- Genus: †Fossiomanus; Mao et al., 2021
- Species: †F. sinensis

Binomial name
- †Fossiomanus sinensis Mao et al., 2021

Extinct genus of mammaliamorphs

Fossiomanus is an extinct genus of tritylodontid mammaliamorphs from the Early Cretaceous of China. It includes one species, F. sinensis, which is known from a single nearly complete skeleton from the Aptian Jiufotang Formation. Features of its limbs and vertebrae indicate that Fossiomanus was adapted towards a fossorial lifestyle.

Fossiomanus lived roughly 120 million years ago, making it potentially the geologically youngest known tritylodontid, which would also make it the last known non-mammalian synapsid.

== Discovery and naming ==
Fossiomanus sinensis was named in 2021 by Fangyuan Mao, Chi Zhang, Cunyu Liu, and Jin Meng, on the basis of the holotype specimen, JZMP-2107500093, a nearly complete skeleton with a damaged skull from the Jiufotang Formation of Liaoning. The genus name is derived from Latin fossio "digging" and manus "hand" and the species name means "from China".

== Description ==
Fossiomanus was 316 millimetres (12.4 in) long, excluding the 65 millimetres (2.6 in)-long tail, with a generally stocky build. Its pointed snout and short tail gave it an overall fusiform body plan. It had an elongate torso, with 26 thoracic vertebrae and 5 lumbar vertebrae. The front foot was broad and robust, with large claws.

== Paleobiology ==
Tritylodontids such as Fossiomanus were herbivores. Fossiomanus was a fossorial taxon, with its powerful forelimbs being used for digging. The long, stocky, fusiform body plan is characteristic of many burrowing mammals.

== Evolution ==
Fossiomanus belongs to Tritylodontidae, a clade of cynodonts that were the last surviving lineage of non-mammalian synapsids. Tritylodontids were widely distributed during the Early Jurassic, but had become restricted to Asia by the Late Jurassic. Fossiomanus is probably the geologically youngest known tritylodontid; its holotype specimen was found just below a tuff layer that has been determined to be 118.9±0.8 million years old. It appears to be slightly more recent than Montirictus, another late-surviving tritylodontid, which was found in strata constrained to be between 121.2±1.1 and 130.7±0.8 million years old. Another late-surviving tritylodontid is Xenocretosuchus, found in the Ilek Formation of Siberia, the age of which is poorly constrained but estimated to be Barremian–Aptian.

Earlier tritylodontids, such as Kayentatherium, did not have the elongate body plan that characterized Fossiomanus. The evolution of an elongate body in Fossiomanus may have been the result of a change in the GDF11 or OCT4 genes, which regulate the development of the transition from the trunk to the tail. With a total of 38 presacral vertebrae, Fossiomanus may have been at the upper limit of the number of presacral vertebrae possible in mammaliamorphs; no known terrestrial mammal exceeds this number, although hyraxes equal it.
