= Ulan Malgait Formation =

Geologic formation in Govi-Altai, Mongolia

- Stratigraphic range: Tithonian or Oxfordian; ~160–145 Ma
- Type: Geological formation
- Sub-units: Shar Teg & Ulan Malgait Beds
- Thickness: up to ~300 m (980 ft)

Lithology
- Primary: Mudstone
- Other: Sandstone, conglomerate, caliche

Location
- Coordinates: 44.1°N 95.8°E
- Approximate paleocoordinates: 46.0°N 98.0°E
- Region: Govi-Altay
- Country: Mongolia

Type section
- Named for: Ulan Malgait Mountain
- Ulan Malgait Formation (Mongolia)

The Ulan Malgait Formation is a Late Jurassic geologic formation in Mongolia. Dinosaur remains are among the fossils that have been recovered from the formation, although as of 2004 none have yet been referred to a specific genus.

It is best known for the Shar Teeg locality which has lent its name to Shartegosuchidae, a family of mesoeucrocodylians (relatives of crocodilians), many of which have been found there; Shartegosuchus (the family's type genus) means "Shar Teeg crocodile". It is divided up into 2 subunits, the lower Shar Teg Beds and the upper Ulan Malgait Beds.

The tritylodontids Shartegodon, Nuurtherium and Bienotheroides are known from the formation., As is docodontan Tegotherium. The turtles Annemys levensis and Annemys latiens and crocodylians Sunosuchus shartegensis and Adzhosuchus fuscus were also recovered from the formation. Numerous species of insects are also known from the formation. which was deposited in a lacustrine environment.

== Age ==
Dollman et al. (2018) argue that the age of the Ulan Malgait Formation is likely to be Oxfordian based on the shared presence of Shartegosuchus and Nominosuchus with the radiometrically dated Shishigou Formation of China.

== See also ==
- List of dinosaur-bearing rock formations
  - List of stratigraphic units with indeterminate dinosaur fossils
