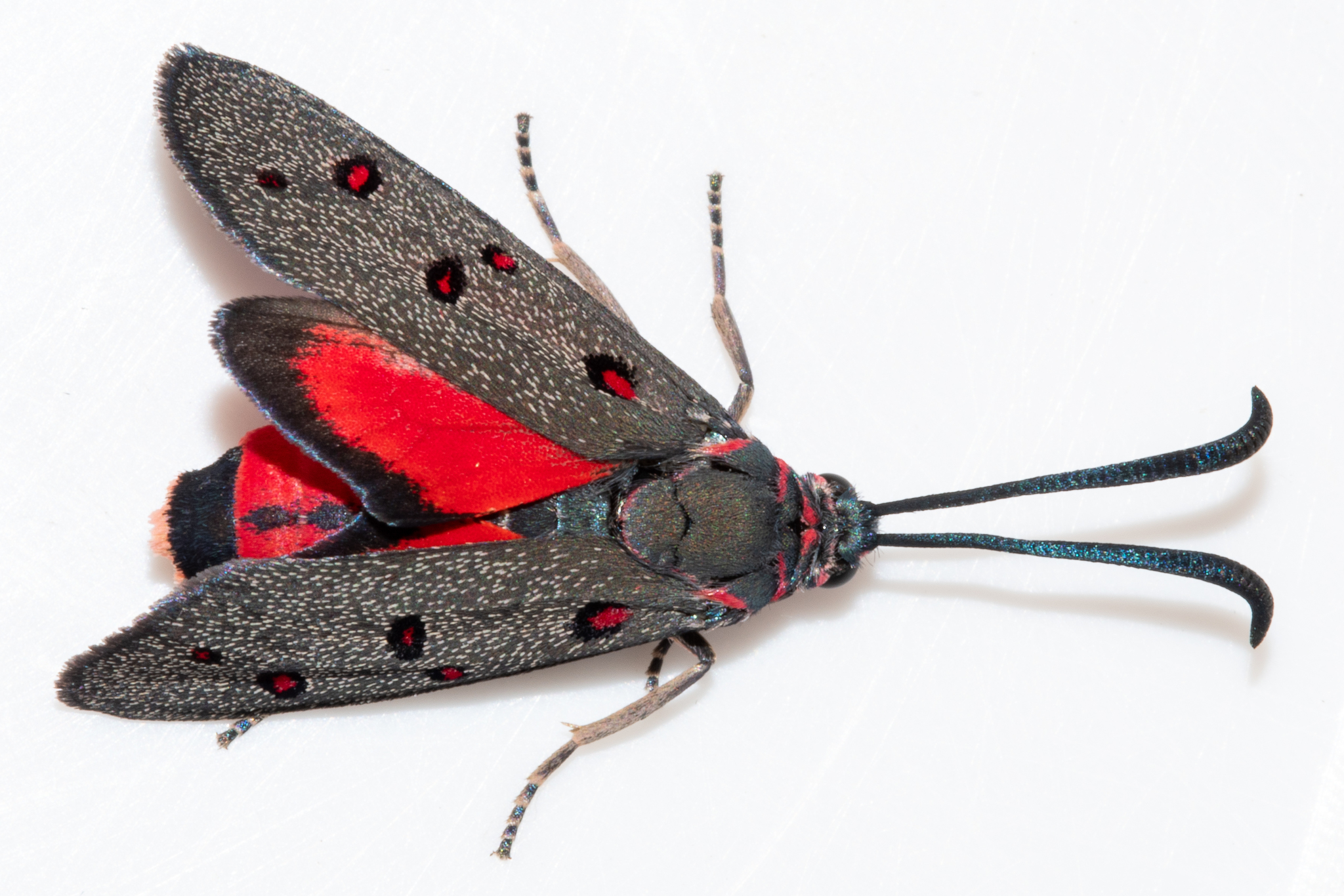

Scientific classification
- Domain: Eukaryota
- Kingdom: Animalia
- Phylum: Arthropoda
- Class: Insecta
- Order: Lepidoptera
- Family: Zygaenidae
- Genus: Neurosymploca
- Species: N. kushaica

Binomial name
- Neurosymploca kushaica (Axel Hofmann, 2017)

= Neurosymploca kushaica =

Species of moths

Neurosymploca kushaica is a species in the family Zygaenidae. It is closely related to Neurosymploca dukeorum, but not conspecific.

== Subspecies ==
There is one known subspecies:

- Neurosymploca kushaica sani Axel Hofmann, 2017

== Distribution ==
Neurosymploca kushaica can be found on the Cape Peninsula and the neighboring hillsides. The subspecies sani is located in Cedarberg, including the Pakhuis Pass.

== Ecology ==
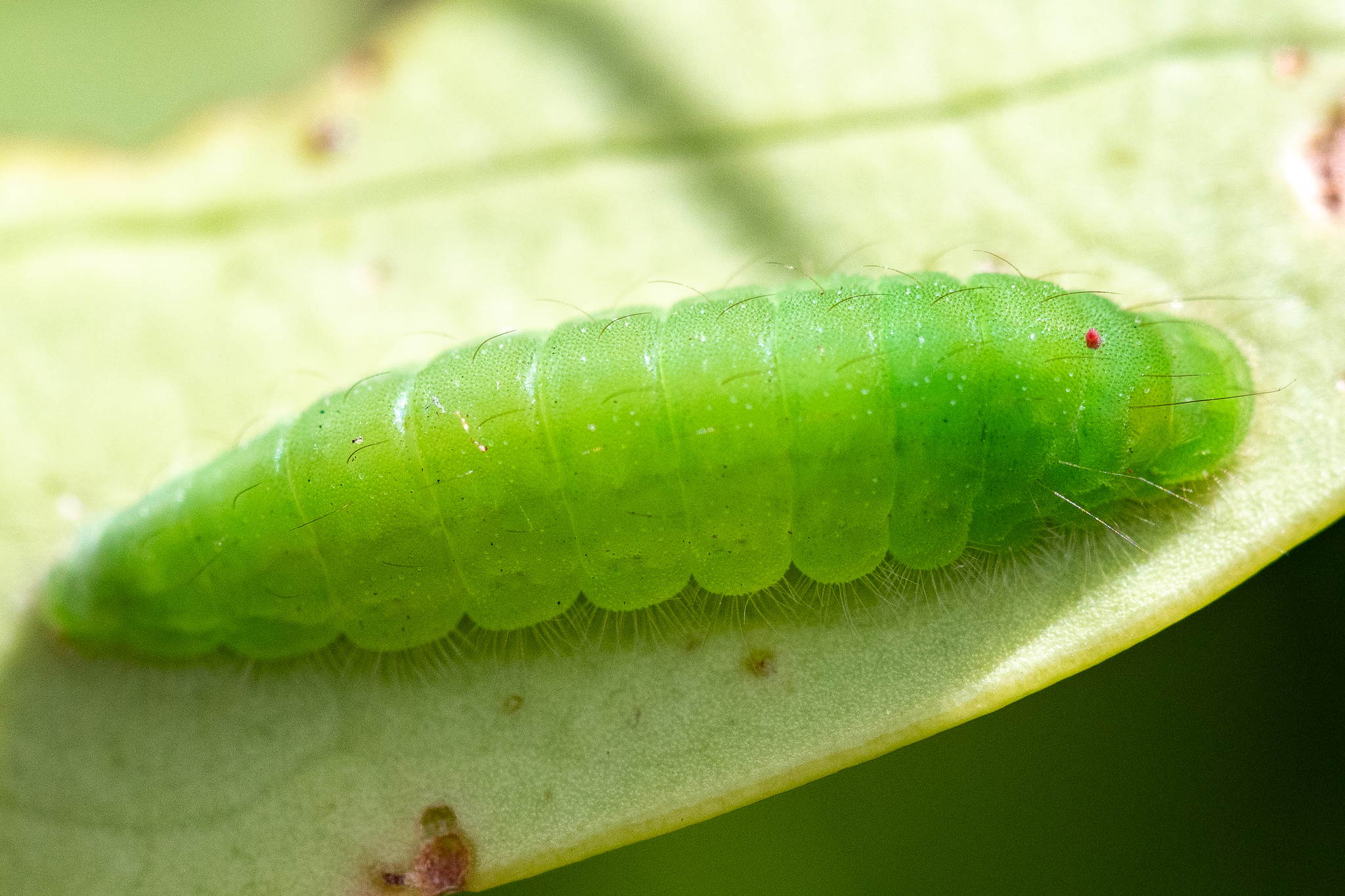
Caterpillars of the species

Caterpillars can mostly be found on Maytenus oleoides and rarely on Cassine schinoides.

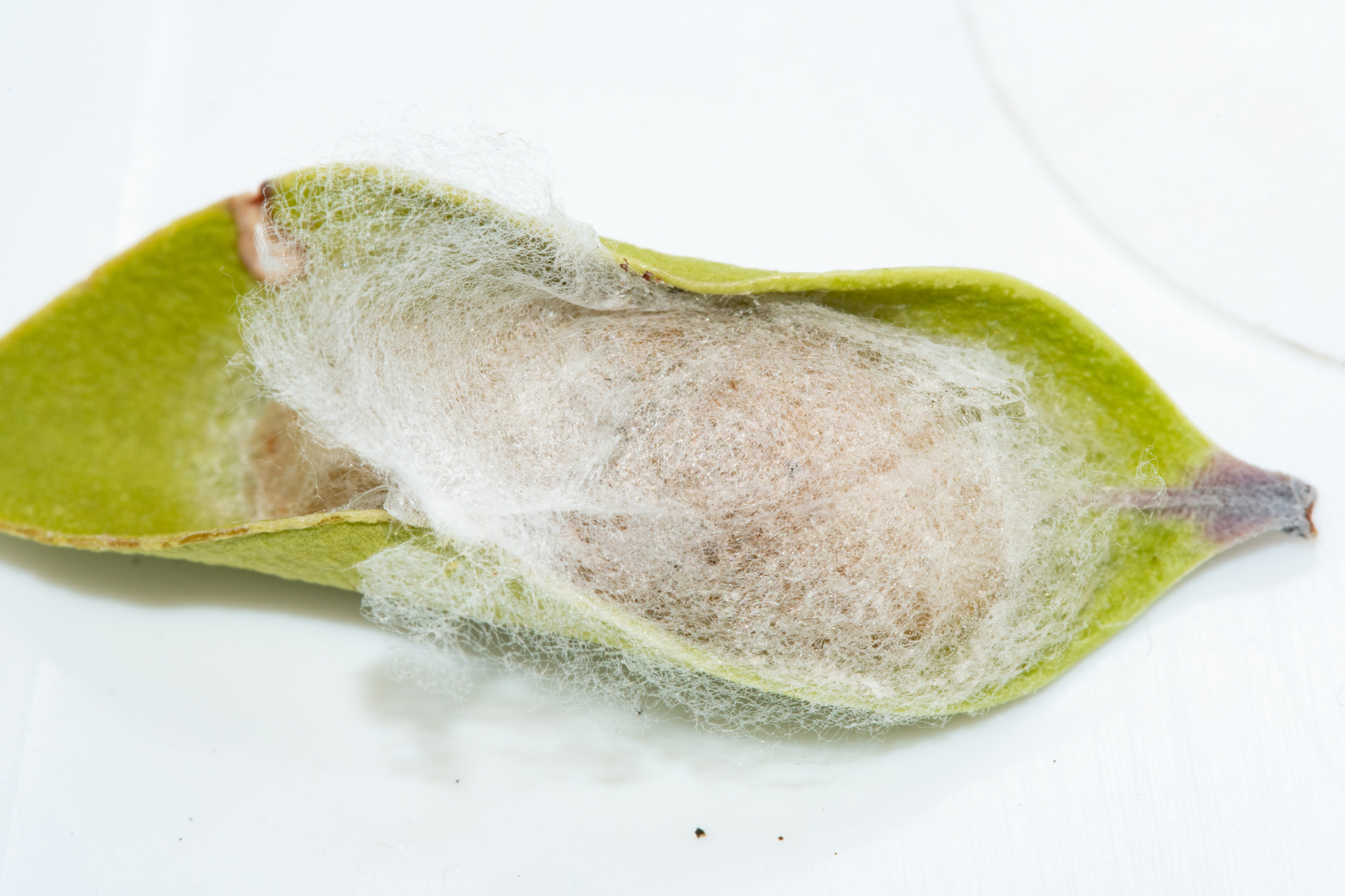
Pupa of the species

== Etymology ==
The species is named after the discoverer's son Kusha Charles in memory of their first field trip together. The sani subspecies is named after the san people, of whom there are historical rock art paintings in its habitat.
