= Kiya (disambiguation) =

Kiya may refer to:

- Kiya, a queen consort of Egypt
- Kiya (river), a river in Russia
- Kiya, a character in Kiya & the Kimoja Heroes
