= Polistodon =

Polistodon Temporal range: Bajocian/Callovian, 171.6–161.2 Ma

Scientific classification
- Kingdom: Animalia
- Phylum: Chordata
- Clade: Synapsida
- Clade: Therapsida
- Clade: Cynodontia
- Family: †Tritylodontidae
- Genus: †Polistodon; He & Cai, 1984
- Species: †P. chuannanensis

Binomial name
- †Polistodon chuannanensis He & Cai, 1984

Extinct genus of mammaliamorphs

Polistodon is an extinct genus of tritylodonts from the Bajocian or Callovian (Middle Jurassic) of China. It contains one species, P. chuannanensis, which is known from a single skull from the Xiashaximiao Formation. According to one study, it may be a species of the genus Stereognathus.
