= Nominosuchus =

Nominosuchus Temporal range: Late Jurassic

Scientific classification
- Kingdom: Animalia
- Phylum: Chordata
- Class: Reptilia
- Clade: Archosauria
- Clade: Pseudosuchia
- Clade: Crocodylomorpha
- Family: †Shartegosuchidae
- Genus: †Nominosuchus; Efimov et al., 1996

Species
- N. matutinus Efimov et al., 1996 (type); N. arcanus Kurzanov et al., 2003

Extinct genus of reptiles

Nominosuchus is a genus of protosuchian-grade crocodyliform. It is known from several specimens discovered in ancient lake deposits of the Tithonian-age Upper Jurassic Ulan Malgait Formation, southwestern Mongolia. The type specimen is PIN 4174/4, a partial skull. Nominosuchus was not large; its skull length is estimated at 60 millimetres (2.4 in). It was similar to Shartegosuchus, and is assigned to the same family (Shartegosuchidae). Nominosuchus was described in 1996 by Mikhail Efimov, and the type species is N. matutinus.
