= Shartegodon =

Shartegodon Temporal range: Late Jurassic, 160–145 Ma

Scientific classification
- Domain: Eukaryota
- Kingdom: Animalia
- Phylum: Chordata
- Clade: Synapsida
- Clade: Therapsida
- Clade: Cynodontia
- Superfamily: †Tritylodontoidea
- Family: †Tritylodontidae
- Genus: †Shartegodon; Velazco, Buczek & Novacek, 2017

Type species
- †Shartegodon altai Velazco, Buzcek & Novacek, 2017

Extinct genus of mammaliamorphs

Shartegodon is an extinct genus of tritylodontid cynodont from late Jurassic Ulan Malgait Formation of Mongolia. The type species, Shartegodon altai, was named in 2017.
