= Nuurtherium =

Nuurtherium Temporal range: Upper Jurassic

Scientific classification
- Domain: Eukaryota
- Kingdom: Animalia
- Phylum: Chordata
- Clade: Synapsida
- Clade: Therapsida
- Clade: Cynodontia
- Family: †Tritylodontidae
- Genus: †Nuurtherium; Velazco et al., 2017

Type species
- Nuurtherium baruunensis Velazco et al., 2017

Extinct genus of mammaliamorphs

Nuurtherium is an extinct genus of tritylodontid cynodonts of the Late Jurassic Ulan Malgait Formation of Mongolia. It contains a single species, N. baruunensis, named by Paúl Velazco and colleagues in 2017.
