= Shartegosuchus =

Shartegosuchus Temporal range: Late Jurassic

Scientific classification
- Kingdom: Animalia
- Phylum: Chordata
- Class: Reptilia
- Clade: Archosauria
- Clade: Pseudosuchia
- Clade: Crocodylomorpha
- Family: †Shartegosuchidae
- Genus: †Shartegosuchus; Efimov, 1988

Species
- S. asperopalatum Efimov, 1988 (type)

Extinct genus of reptiles

Shartegosuchus is a genus of protosuchian-grade crocodyliform. It is known primarily from PIN 4174/2, the partial deformed skull and jaws of a juvenile. This specimen was discovered in ancient lake deposits of the Tithonian-age Upper Jurassic Ulan Malgait Formation, southwestern Mongolia. The estimated length of the holotype skull is 40 millimetres (1.6 in). This genus was similar to Nominosuchus, and both are assigned to the same family (Shartegosuchidae). Shartegosuchus was described in 1988 by Mikhail Efimov, and the type species is S. asperopalatum.
