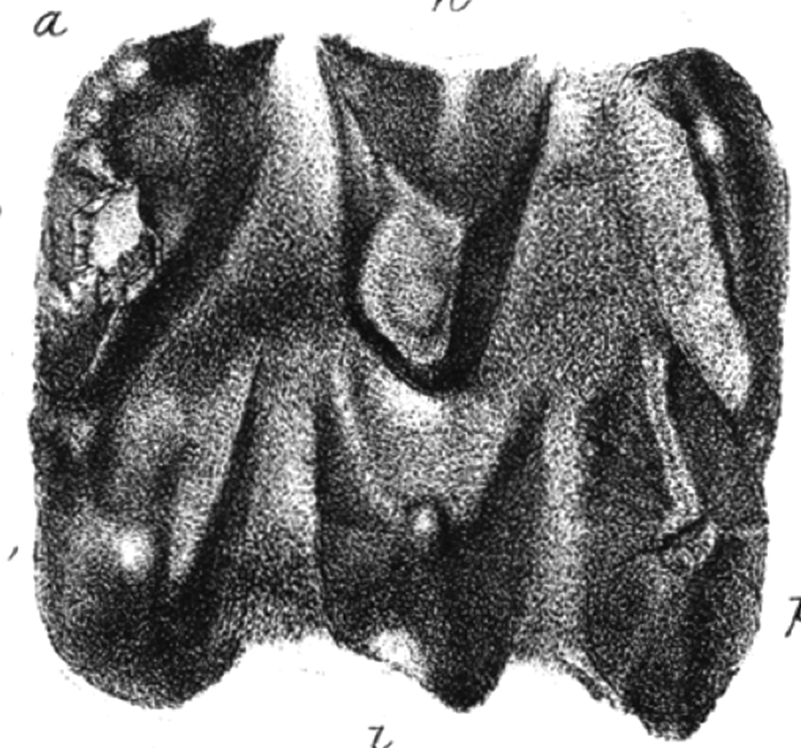
- The postcanine tooth of Stereognathus ooliticus, from Owen 1857.

Scientific classification
- Kingdom: Animalia
- Phylum: Chordata
- Clade: Synapsida
- Clade: Therapsida
- Clade: Cynodontia
- Family: †Tritylodontidae
- Genus: †Stereognathus; Charlesworth, 1854

Type species
- Stereognathus ooliticus Charlesworth, 1854

Potential species
- S. chuannanensis (He & Cai, 1984; originally Polistodon); S. kolossovi (Lopatin & Agadjanian, 2008; originally Xenocretosuchus); S. kuwajimaensis (Matsuoka et al., 2016; originally Montirictus); S. sibiricus (Tatarinov & Mashenko, 1999; originally Xenocretosuchus)

Synonyms
- S. hebridicus? Waldman & Savage, 1972

= Stereognathus =

Stereognathus Temporal range: Bathonian-Barremian?, 167.7–165.7 Ma

Extinct genus of mammaliamorphs

Stereognathus is an extinct genus of tritylodontid cynodonts from the Middle Jurassic of the United Kingdom. There is a single named species: S. ooliticus, named after the Great Oolite deposits of England. A second species, S. hebridicus, was named after the Hebrides in Scotland, where it was found; it was synonymized with S. ooliticus in 2017.

== Discovery and naming ==
S. ooliticus was the first tritylodontid species ever found, being described by Charlesworth in 1855 and later by Sir Richard Owen. In 1972, S. hebridicus was named from several postcanine teeth recovered in Bathonian age deposits on the Isle of Skye in Scotland by palaeontologists R. J. G. Savage and Michael Waldman. Despite being the first tritylodontid genus found and named, Stereognathus remains poorly represented, being known mainly from isolated molar teeth. There is, however, one holotype fragment of maxilla with three damaged molars, and a second fragment of maxilla with four sets of molar roots.

In 2017, Elsa Panciroli and colleagues found no points of variance between the anatomy of S. ooliticus and S. hebridicus, accounting for changes with growth, which makes S. hebridicus a junior synonym of S. ooliticus. Also in 2017, Alexander Averianov and colleagues considered species of Polistodon, Xenocretosuchus, and Montirictus to be within the genus Stereognathus; they also retained S. hebridicus as a separate species. However, this would mean Stereognathus persisted almost unchanged for over 60 million years across the whole of Eurasia, which would be very unusual. The issue remains unresolved.
