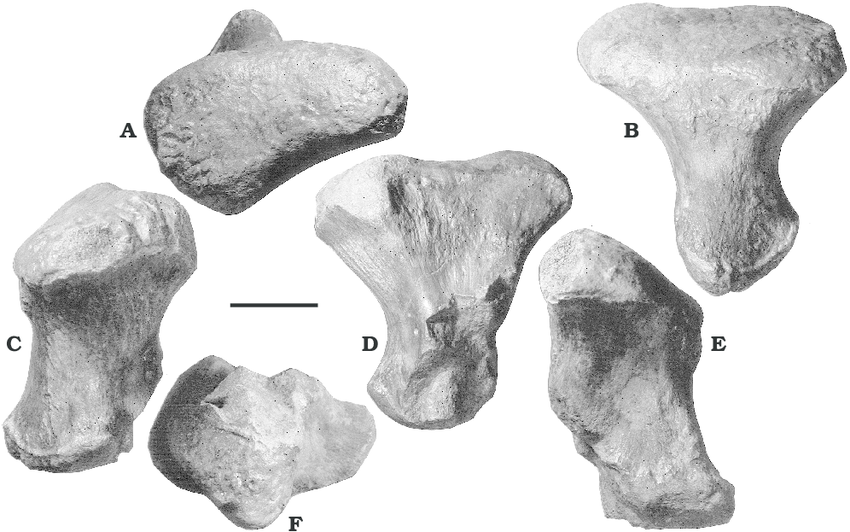
- Sibirotitan astrosacralis metatarsal I, PM TGU 16/0−8, in multiple views

Scientific classification
- Kingdom: Animalia
- Phylum: Chordata
- Class: Reptilia
- Clade: Dinosauria
- Clade: Saurischia
- Clade: †Sauropodomorpha
- Clade: †Sauropoda
- Clade: †Macronaria
- Clade: †Somphospondyli
- Genus: †Sibirotitan; Averianov et al., 2018

Type species
- Sibirotitan astrosacralis Averianov et al., 2018

= Sibirotitan =

Sibirotitan Temporal range: Early Cretaceous, Barremian

Extinct genus of reptiles

Sibirotitan ("Siberian titan") is a genus of somphospondyl sauropod from the Early Cretaceous (Barremian age) Ilek Formation of Russia. The type and only species is S. astrosacralis.

== Discovery and naming ==
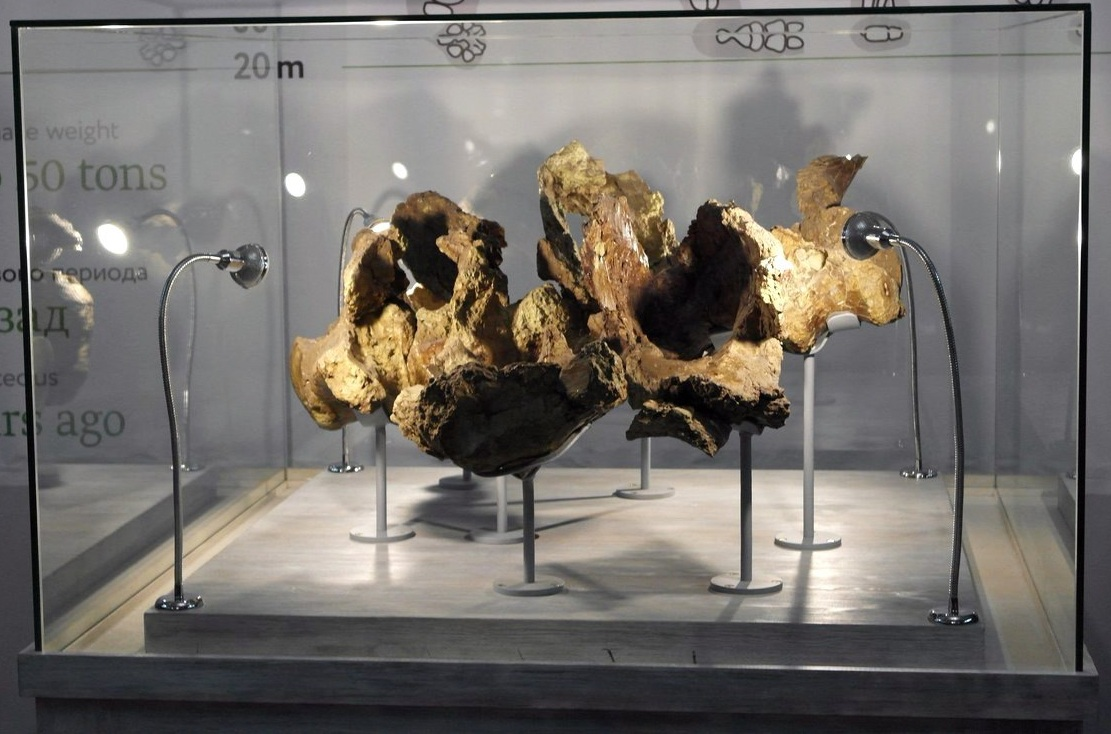
Sacrum on display in Tomsk State University

The material assigned to Sibirotitan was found in the Shestakovo 1 locality of the Ilek Formation, deposited in a cliff on the Kiya River's right bank, near Shestakovo Village in Kemerovo Province, West Siberia, Russia. Vertebrate remains were first recovered in 1953, and larger dinosaur fossils were found later in the sixties. Definitive sauropod remains were first discovered during expeditions in 1994 and 1995. In 2002, a reasonably complete foot would be described by Russian vertebrate paleontologist Alexander Averianov and colleagues; there was insufficient material to name the taxon, but they identified it as a member of Titanosauriformes, noting teeth from the locality indicated possible brachiosaur identity, but that a caudal vertebra from a nearby locality indicated the presence of a titanosaur as well.

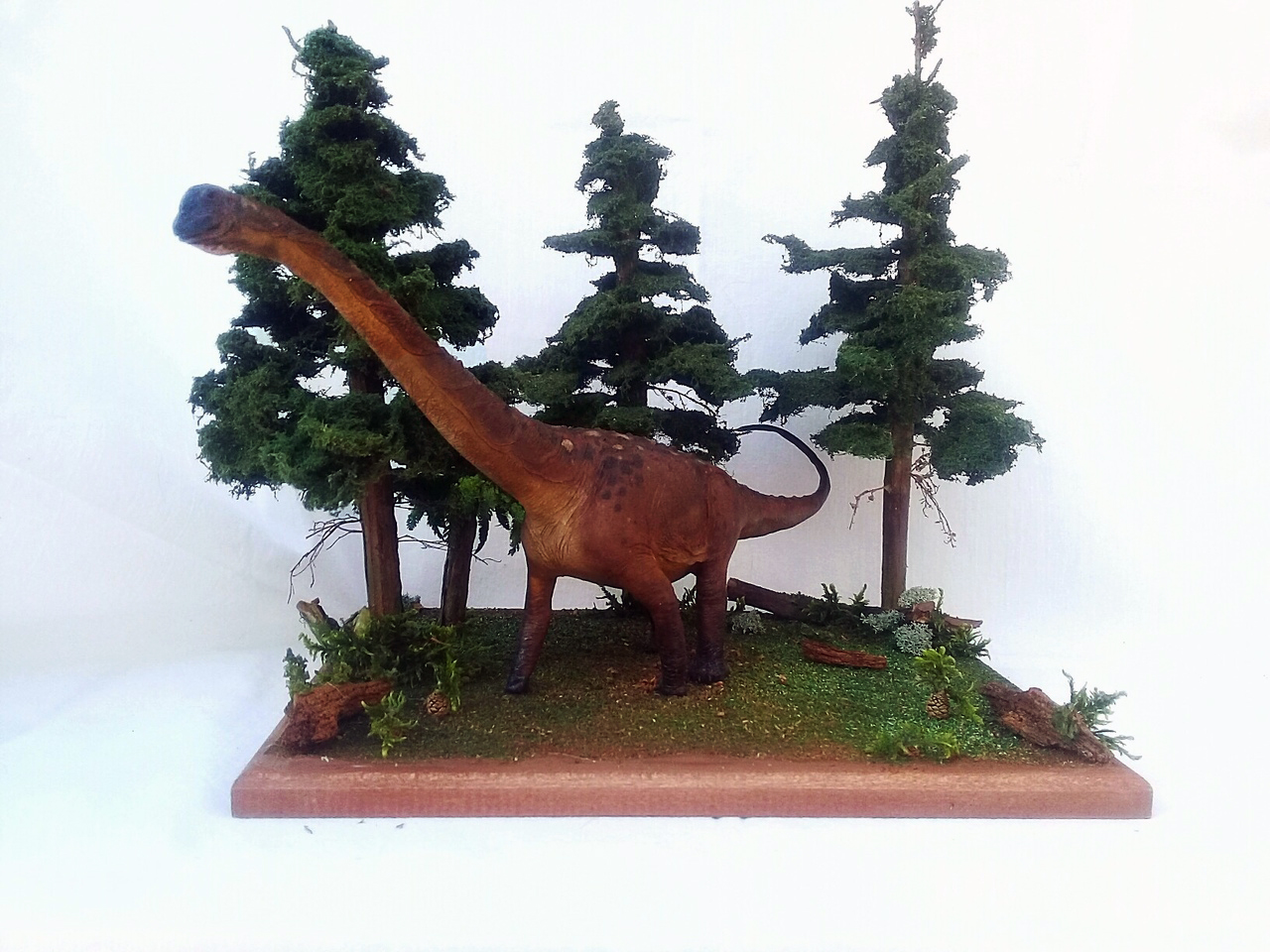
Model

Specimens would continue to turn up, and in 2018, Averianov et al. would name those which could be confidently referred to as the same taxon as S. astrosacralis; this included teeth, a sacrum, assorted vertebrae, and the previously described foot. This made it the second sauropod species named from the country, after Tengrisaurus, named earlier in the same year; the genus Arkharavia, named in 2010, although originally described as a sauropod, was later reassigned to Hadrosauridae. Earlier, in 2015, it had been informally nicknamed "Sibirosaurus" in the press. The final name of Sibirotitan was derived from Siberia, where it was found, and the Greek Τιτάν (titan), the second group of divine beings in Greek Mythology, preceding the Olympians. The specific name S. astrosacralis is derived from the Greek ἄστρον, meaning "star", and Latin os sacrum, meaning "sacred bone". This refers to the star-like way in which the sacral ribs radiate in dorsal view.

The authors noted that Sibirotitan was one of the oldest titanosauriform species discovered in Asia. More primitive known species were found in other parts of the world, such as Europe, North America, or Gondwana. Sibirotitan, alongside Fukuititan, are the first to appear in the Asian fossil record, both thought to have lived in the Barremian age. Later relatives are well known from Asia afterwards, from the Aptian through to the Santonian, and it is proposed that one of these later taxa could have given rise to the Lithostrotia, a titanosaur group whose earliest representatives are Asian genera such as Tengrisaurus (from the Barremian or Aptian of Russia) and Jiangshanosaurus (from the Albian of China). The latter was noted to have similar dorsal vertebrae to the much older Sibirotitan.

Most of the referred specimens, although dis-articulated, are thought to have belonged to a single individual; it was suggested the large remains found in the 1960s could have originally been from the same skeleton as later remains, some found as recently as 2011. A singular cervical centrum was noted to be juvenile, and from a different individual, as the rest of the remains belonged to an adult animal. Among these fossils, PM TGU 120/10-Sh1-22, a dorsal vertebra, was selected as the holotype specimen.

An axis vertebra from the type locality was later assigned to Sibirotitan astrosacralis as well.

== Description ==
Two characters were found to distinguish it from its close relatives. The hyposphene ridge on its dorsal vertebrae was particularly high, unlike other members of Titanosauriformes; this is the only autapomorphy of the taxon. Its possession of only five sacral vertebrae distinguishes it from all other somphospondyls, as possession of six is a synapomorphy of the clade. It was noted that juveniles have fewer vertebrae, but given the adult age of the individual examined, the trait was instead seen as an evolutionary reversal.

Using one of the cervical vertebrae, a size estimate was attempted. They found it roughly corresponded in size to that of the diplodocoid sauropod Apatosaurus, and suggested a similar size of 20 tonnes might have been possible.

== Classification ==
Several characters were noted among the remains, four of which allowed classification in the group Titanosauriformes. These include the fashion in which the tooth crowns align in the jaw, presacral bone texture, and both the elongation of and the concave nature of certain parts of the cervical centra. An additional character, relating to the size of the arch of the cervical vertebrae, was used to assign it more specifically as a member of Somphospondyli. Characters in its vertebrae and ribs were found shared with Epachthosaurus and Euhelopus.

A phylogenetic analysis was performed. It was noted that many differing and conflicting matrices exist for analyzing the systematics of Titanosauriformes, due to many taxa being poorly known. Because it is suited well for basal Titanosauriformes in particular, the matrix of Mannion et al. (2013) was chosen. In this analysis, it was found to be a relatively advanced non-titanosaurian somphosondyl. The following phylogenetic tree was produced:

- Somphospondyli
  - Dongbeititan
  - - - Liubangosaurus
      - Pelorosaurus
      - Euhelopodidae
    - - Astrophocaudia
      - - Brontomerus
        - - Chubutisaurus
          - - Angolatitan
            - - Tastavinsaurus
              - - Malarguesaurus
                - - - - Paluxysaurus
                      - Sauroposeidon
                    - - Cloverly Titanosauriform (YPM 5449)
                      - Fukuititan
                      - Ligabuesaurus
                  - - Sibirotitan
                    - - - Ruyangosaurus
                        - Wintonotitan
                      - - Huanghetitan
                        - - Huanghetitan ruyangensis
                          - Titanosauria
