= Montirictus =

Montirictus Temporal range: Barremian-Aptian

Scientific classification
- Kingdom: Animalia
- Phylum: Chordata
- Clade: Synapsida
- Clade: Therapsida
- Clade: Cynodontia
- Family: †Tritylodontidae
- Genus: †Montirictus; Matsuoka et al., 2016

Type species
- Montirictus kuwajimaensis Matsuoka et al., 2016

Extinct genus of mammaliamorphs

Montirictus is an extinct genus of tritylodonts known from the Early Cretaceous Kuwajima Formation of Japan. It was among the latest surviving tritylodontids, and is closely related to the earlier Xenocretosuchus from mainland Asia, and the Jurassic Stereognathus from the UK. It may be a species of the genus Stereognathus, but resolution of its affinities conditions upon the discovery of additional material.
