= Xenocretosuchus =

Xenocretosuchus Temporal range: Aptian, 136.4–125.45 Ma

Scientific classification
- Kingdom: Animalia
- Phylum: Chordata
- Clade: Synapsida
- Clade: Therapsida
- Clade: Cynodontia
- Family: †Tritylodontidae
- Genus: †Xenocretosuchus; Tatarinov & Matchenko, 1999

Type species
- Xenocretosuchus sibiricus Tatarinov & Matchenko, 1999

Other species
- X. kolossovi Lopatin & Agadjanian, 2008

Extinct genus of mammaliamorphs

Xenocretosuchus is an extinct genus of tritylodont therapsids from the Aptian (Early Cretaceous) Ilek Formation of Siberia, in the Russian Federation. The type species, X. sibiricus, is known only from dental elements, as is X. kolossovi, described from the Batylykh Formation in 2008. Some authors have treated these species as part of the genus Stereognathus, otherwise known from the Middle Jurassic of Britain, but this is rejected by other authors.

Alongside Montirictus and Fossiomanus, it is amongst the latest known non-mammaliform synapsids, extending their range to the Early Cretaceous.

== Palaeobiology ==
=== Locomotion ===
Xenocretosuchus possessed a highly developed mandibular middle ear, which has been interpreted as an indication of fossoriality in the genus.
