= Kyasuchus =

Kyasuchus Temporal range: Early Cretaceous

Scientific classification
- Domain: Eukaryota
- Kingdom: Animalia
- Phylum: Chordata
- Class: Reptilia
- Clade: Archosauria
- Clade: Pseudosuchia
- Clade: Crocodylomorpha
- Clade: Crocodyliformes
- Family: †Shartegosuchidae
- Genus: †Kyasuchus; Efimov and Leshchinskiy, 2000

Species
- K. saevi Efimov and Leshchinskiy, 2000 (type)

Extinct genus of reptiles

Kyasuchus is an extinct genus of shartegosuchid crocodyliform. Fossils have been found from the Ilek Formation outcropping in the Kemerovo Oblast of Russia, deposited during the Aptian and Albian stages of the Early Cretaceous. The localities from which specimens of this genus have been found have also yielded many other vertebrate remains such as those of palaeonisciform fishes, turtles, various lizards, troodontids, triconodonts, the ceratopsian Psittacosaurus, and the protosuchian-grade crocodylomorph Tagarosuchus.
