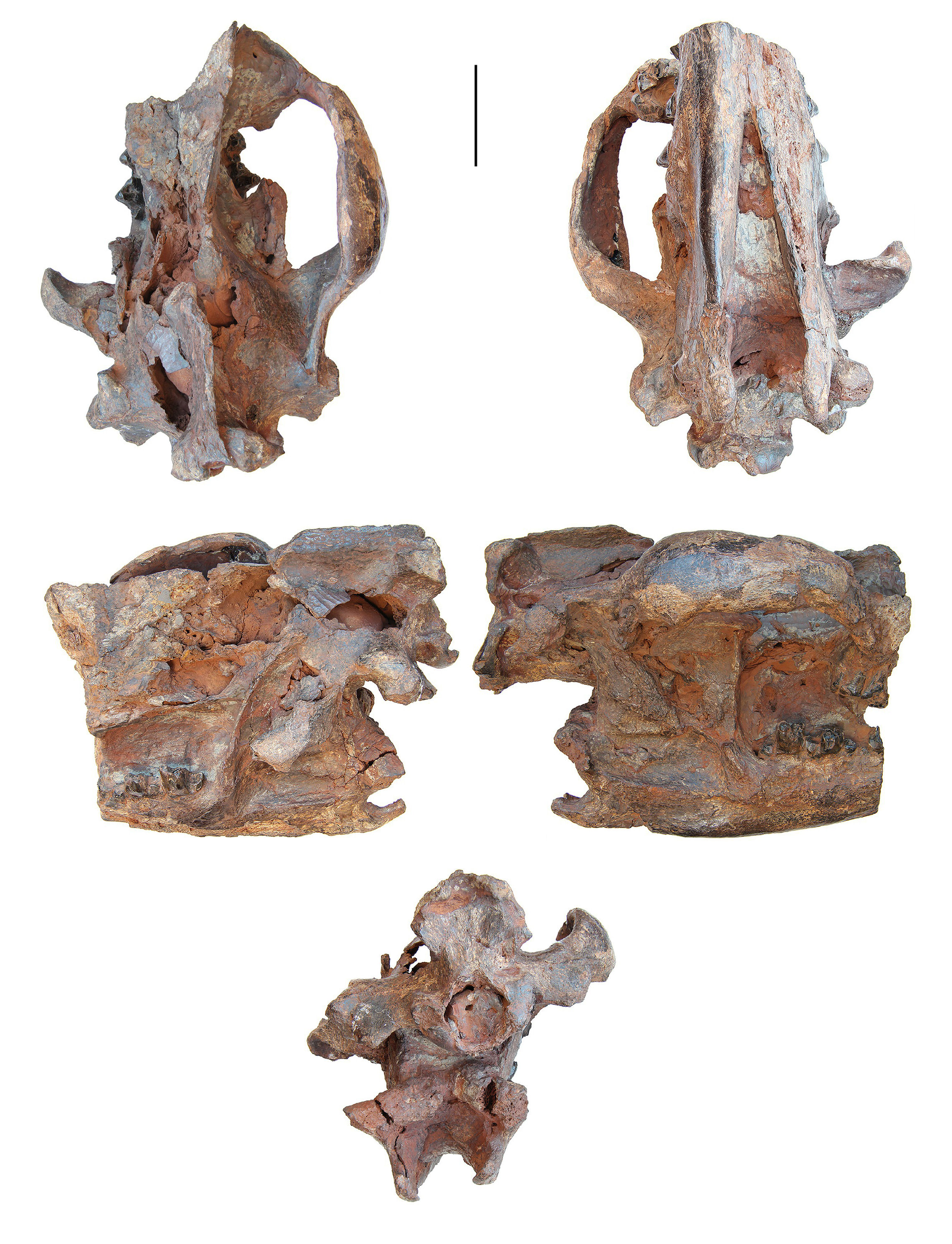
- skull of Maocyon peregrinus

Scientific classification
- Kingdom: Animalia
- Phylum: Chordata
- Class: Mammalia
- Infraclass: Placentalia
- Order: †Hyaenodonta
- Superfamily: †Hyainailouroidea
- Family: †Hyainailouridae
- Subfamily: †Hyainailourinae
- Genus: †Maocyon; Averianov et al., 2023

Type species
- †Maocyon peregrinus Averianov et al., 2023

= Maocyon =

Maocyon Temporal range: 37.7–33.9 Ma Late Eocene

Extinct genus of mammals

Maocyon ("dog from Maoming") is an extinct genus of hyaenodonts from extinct paraphyletic subfamily Hyainailourinae within paraphyletic family Hyainailouridae, that lived during the late Eocene in China. It is a monotypic genus that contains the species M. peregrinus.
