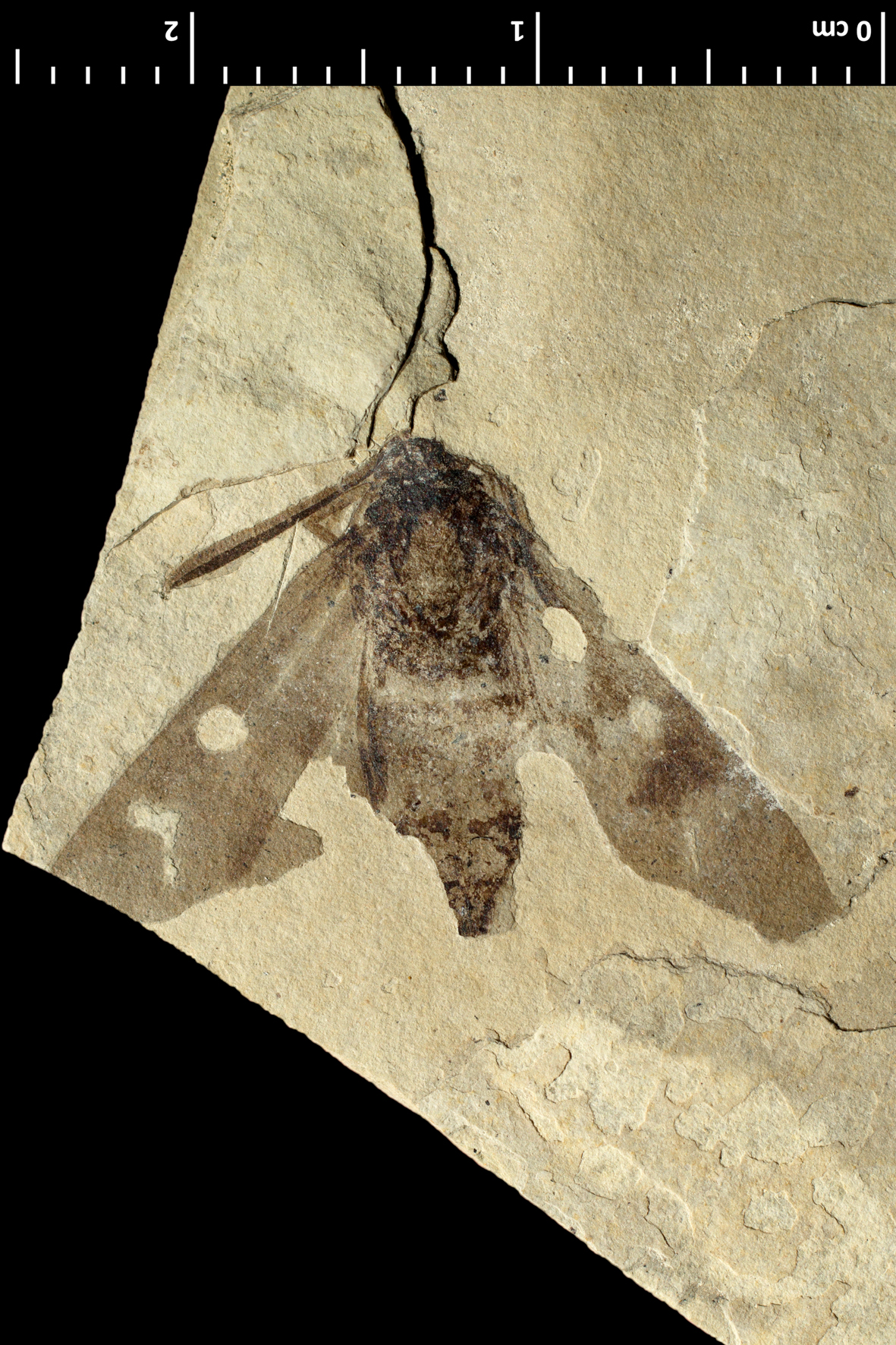
- Holotype specimen, part side with direct lighting

Scientific classification
- Kingdom: Animalia
- Phylum: Arthropoda
- Clade: Pancrustacea
- Class: Insecta
- Order: Lepidoptera
- Family: Zygaenidae
- Genus: Neurosymploca
- Species: N. ? oligocenica

Binomial name
- Neurosymploca ? oligocenica Fernández-Rubio & Nel, 2000

= Neurosymploca? oligocenica =

Neurosymploca? oligocenica Temporal range: Rupelian

Extinct species of moth

Neurosymploca? oligocenica is an extinct species of moth in the family Zygaenidae, and possibly in the modern genus Neurosymploca. The species is known from Early Oligocene, Rupelian stage, lake deposits near the commune of Céreste in the Alpes-de-Haute-Provence, France.

== History and classification ==
Neurosymploca? oligocenica is known only from one fossil, the holotype, specimen "MNHN-LP-R 55185". It is a single, mostly complete adult which may be male, preserved as a compression fossil in fine grained shale. The shale specimen is from the fossil bearing calcareous and oilshale outcrops of paleolake Céreste. The type specimen is currently preserved in the paleoentomological collections housed in the Muséum national d'histoire naturelle, the National Museum of Natural History, located in Paris, France. N.? oligocenica was first studied by Fidel Fernández-Rubio of Madrid, Spain and André Nel of the Muséum national d'histoire naturelle, with their 2000 type description being published in the journal Boletín de La S.E.A. Fernández-Rubio and Nel coined the specific epithet oligocenica as a reference to Oligocene, the age of the species. At the time of description, a second fossil possibly from the same species had recently been discovered; however, as it was being held in a private collection in Strasbourg, France, it was unavailable for study.

== Description ==
The holotype of N.? oligocenica is 14.22 mm (0.560 in) long with a robust thorax and an abdomen which has four possible color bands and a definite darker fifth band near the apex. The slender antennae are 38–46 segments long, with tips which form less differentiated antennal clubs at the tips than modern species in the family. The antennae display a rhomboidal cross section that is not present in any other member of the family. While poorly preserved and partly disarticulated, the legs are very similar in appearance to modern species. The fore wings are 15.7 mm (0.62 in) long and 4.22 mm (0.166 in) wide, giving a length to width ratio that is greater than in modern species, and fits the suggestion put forth by B. Alberti in 1954 that modern species of Neurosymploca have narrower wings than other members of the tribe. The 7.90-millimetre (0.311 in) hind wings are mostly obscured by the fore wings. While partial, the fore and hind wings still show some color pattering. The counterpart side of the fossil displays three distinct light spots in the uniformly clear brown fore wings and the hind wings show the characteristic rectangular spot found in some modern species.

N.? oligocenica has the same combination of characters as modern Neurosymploca species, which indicates a probable diurnal lifestyle. N.? oligocenica is also the oldest member of the subfamily Zygaeninae and its presence in the Oligocene of France confirms the ancestors of the modern Palearctic genera Epizygaenella and Zyngaena were present in Europe before the Miocene.

The rhomboid antenna structuring found in N.? oligocenica is unique, and leaves the phylogenetic position of the species uncertain, with the possibility it may represent an extinct genus rather than being a member of Neurosymploca.
