= Ilek Formation =

Geologic formation in Western Siberia, Russia

- Stratigraphic range: Lower Cretaceous, Barremian–Aptian
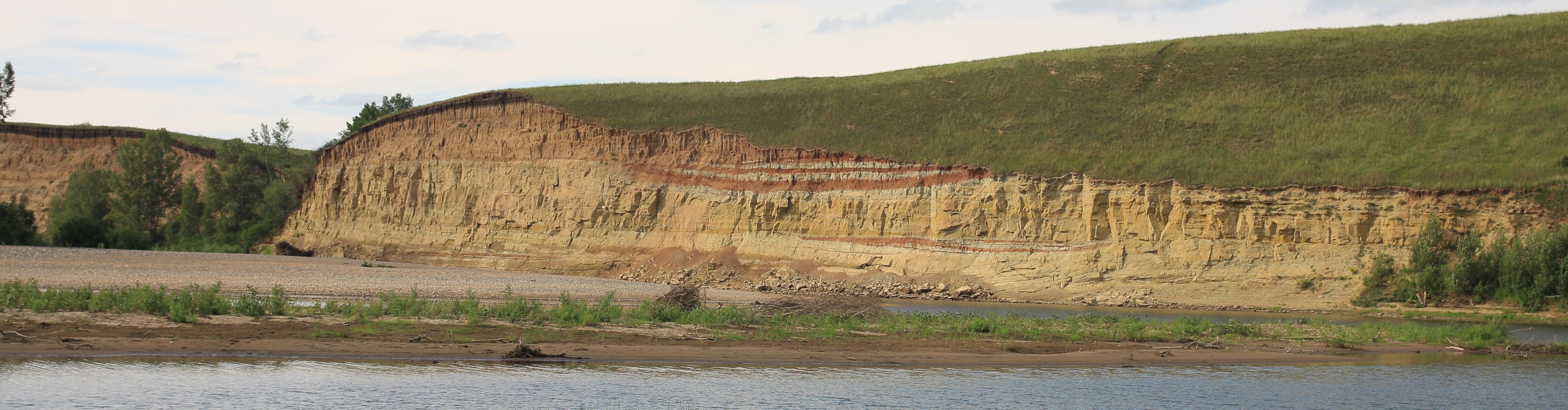
- Shestakovo 1 locality
- Type: Geological formation
- Unit of: Kiya River Basin
- Underlies: Kiya Formation
- Overlies: Tyazhin Formation
- Thickness: Up to 746 metres (2,450 ft)

Lithology
- Primary: Clay, siltstone
- Other: Marl, sandstone

Location
- Coordinates: 55.9°N 88.0°E
- Approximate paleocoordinates: 54.2°N 84.6°E
- Region: Western Siberia
- Country: Russia
- Extent: Kemerovo Oblast

Type section
- Named by: L. A. Ragozin
- Year defined: 1935
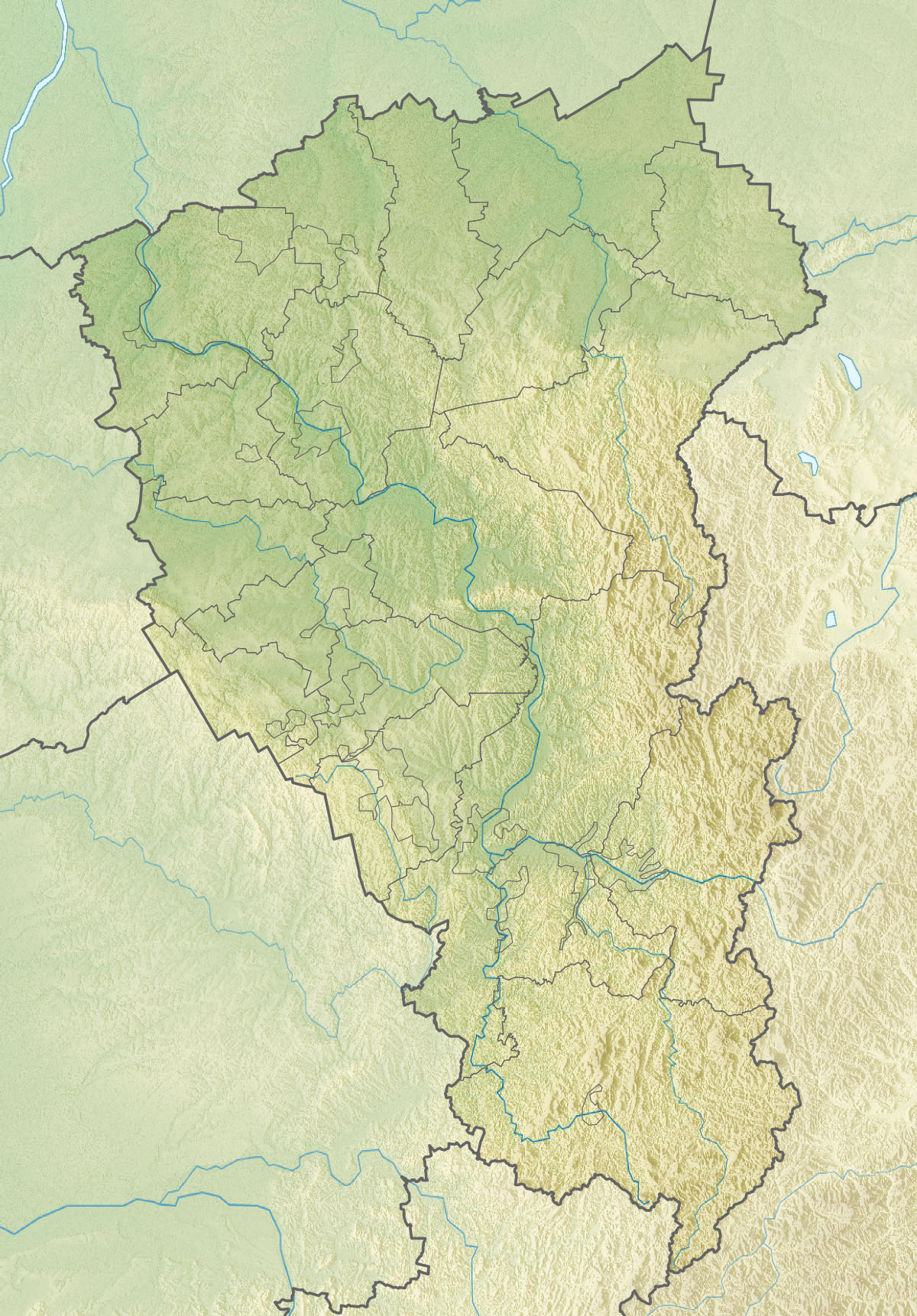
- Ilek Formation (Russia) Ilek Formation (Kemerovo Oblast)

The Ilek Formation is a Lower Cretaceous geologic formation in Western Siberia. Many different fossils have been recovered from the formation. It overlies the Late Jurassic Tyazhin Formation and underlies the Albian Kiya Formation.

The formation was described by L. A. Ragozin in 1935. It consists of sands with sandstone concretions, layers of silts, clays and marls. Age of the formation, according to a crude 1962 estimate, is Valanginian(?) - Hauterivian - Barremian. Its thickness varies greatly, reaching 746 m in Teguldet borehole. A more recent 2024 estimate based on invertebrate and vertebrate fossils placed the age of the formation at Barremian–Aptian.

== Age ==
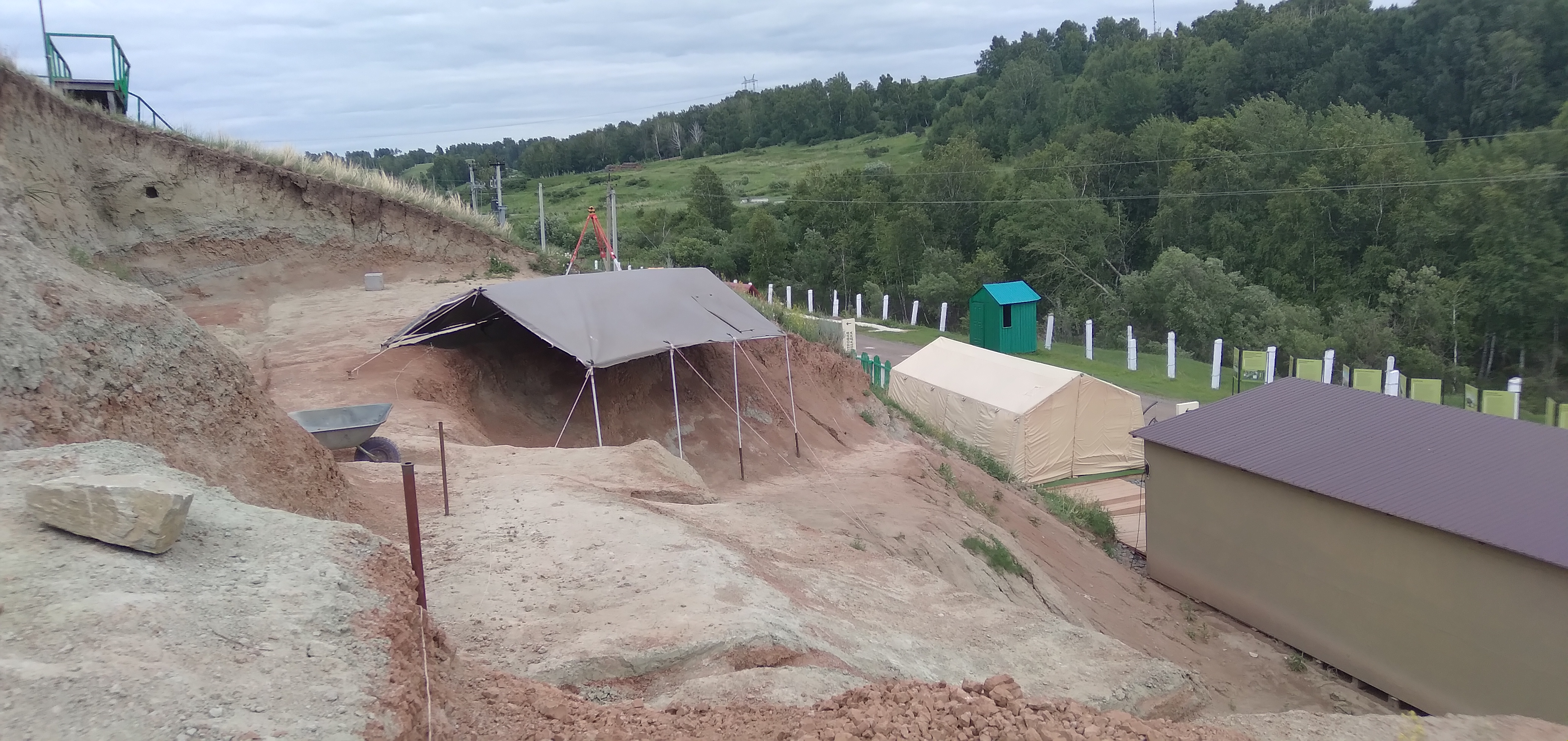
Shestakovo 3 locality

The Ilek Formation conformably overlies the Upper Jurassic Tyazhin Formation. Gastropods and bivalves of Valanginian age have been recovered from the lower part of the formation, and gastropods and bivalves of Hauterivian to Barremian age have been found in the upper part, as well as Barremian ostracods. The age of the Shestakovo 1 locality is poorly constrained. Palynological samples from the Shestakovo 3 locality are characteristic of the Aptian. No angiosperm pollen has been found at this locality, indicating that it is older than the Albian. The upper layers of the formation do contain angiosperm pollen, indicating that part of the formation may extend into the Albian. The overlying Kiya Formation is upper Albian based on plant biostratigraphy.

== Fauna ==
=== Amphibians ===
Amphibians reported from the Ilek Formation
Genus	Species	Locality	Material	Notes	Images
Kiyatriton	K. leshchinskiyi	Shestakovo 1	Atlas, trunk vertebrae, fragmentary dentaries, femora, humerus, and nearly complete ilium	A crown-group salamander	
Kuzbassia	K. sola	Shestakovo 1	Two atlantal centra and a trunk vertebral centrum	A karaurid	

=== Mammaliamorphs ===
Mammaliamorphs reported from the Ilek Formation
Genus	Species	Locality	Material	Notes	Images
Acinacodus	A. tagaricus		Right dentary fragment	An amphidontid mammal	
Baidabatyr	B. clivosus	Bol'shoi Kemchug 3	Upper premolar	A multituberculate	
Gobiconodon	G. borissiaki		21 upper and lower jaws.	A gobiconodont	
Gobiconodon	G. hoburensis		A fragmentary lower jaw.	A gobiconodont	
Kemchugia	K. magna		A tooth	An amphilestid mammal	
Kiyatherium	K. cardiodens		A maxilla	A zhangheotheriid mammal	
Sibirotherium	S. rossicum	Bol'shoi Kemchug 4	M1 tooth; mandibular fragments	A docodontan mammaliaform	
Xenocretosuchus	X. sibiricus		Dental elements	A tritylodontid mammaliamorph	
Yermakia	Y. domitor	Shestakovo 1	A mandible	A tinodontid mammal	

=== Choristoderes ===
Choristoderes reported from the Ilek Formation
Genus	Species	Locality	Material	Notes	Images
cf. Khurendukhosaurus	K. cf. sp	Bol'shoi Kemchug 3	Dorsal vertebra, sacral vertebra	A non-neochoristodere choristodere	
"Shestakovo choristodere"		Shestakovo; Bol'shoi Kemchug 3; Bol'shaya Terekhtul' 2	Fragmentary dentaries, several vertebrae, rib fragments	A possible neochoristodere	
Choristodera	Indeterminate	Smolenskii Yar	Cervical centrum	May represent a taxon distinct from both Khurendukhosaurus and the "Shestakovo choristodere"	

=== Lizards ===
Lizards reported from the Ilek Formation
Genus	Species	Locality	Material	Notes	Images
Paramacellodidae	Indeterminate	Kemchug assemblage; Kiya assemblage			
Platynota	Indeterminate	Kemchug assemblage			
Xenosauridae	Indeterminate	Kemchug assemblage; Kiya assemblage		A knob-scaled lizard	

=== Turtles ===
Turtles reported from the Ilek Formation
Genus	Species	Locality	Material	Notes	Images
Kirgizemys				A macrobaenid	

=== Crocodylomorphs ===
Crocodylomorphs reported from the Ilek Formation
Genus	Species	Locality	Material	Notes	Images
Kyasuchus	K. saevi	Shestakovo 3	A partial skull	A shartegosuchid crocodyliform	
Tagarosuchus	T. kulemzini	Shestakovo 3	Nearly complete skull	A crocodyliform	

=== Pterosaurs ===
Pterosaurs reported from the Ilek Formation
Genus	Species	Locality	Material	Notes	Image
?Ctenochasmatidae	Indeterminate	Bol'shoi Kemchug 3			
Lonchognathosaurus	L. cf. sp.	Novochernorechensk	Wing metacarpal fragment	A dsungaripterid	
Ornithocheiridae	Indeterminate	Shestakovo 1			
Pterodactyloidea	Indeterminate	Bol'shoi Kemchug 3			

=== Dinosaurs ===
==== Sauropodomorphs ====
Sauropodomorphs reported from the Ilek Formation
Genus	Species	Locality	Material	Notes	Images
Lithostrotia	Indeterminate		Caudal vertebrae	Potentially three distinct taxa of titanosaur	
Sibirotitan	S. astrosacralis	Shestakovo 1; Shestakovo 3	Vertebrae, sacrum, and pedal elements	A somphospondylan sauropod	
Euhelopodidae	Indeterminate	Shestakovo 3	Partial fibula		

==== Ornithischians ====
Ornithischians reported from the Ilek Formation
Genus	Species	Locality	Material	Notes	Images
Ornithischia	Indeterminate	Shestakovo 1; Bol'shoi Kemchug 3	Isolated teeth	Originally identified as two distinct "hypsilophodontid" taxa	
Psittacosaurus	P. sibiricus	Shestakovo	Several skeletons	A ceratopsian	
Stegosauria	Indeterminate	Bol'shoi Kemchug 3	Isolated teeth		

==== Theropods ====
Theropods reported from the Ilek Formation
Genus	Species	Locality	Material	Notes	Images
Evgenavis	E. nobilis		A set of limb elements	A confuciusornithiform	
Kiyacursor	K. longipes	Shestakovo 1	Partial skeleton including cervical and caudal vertebrae, cervical and dorsal ribs, a left scapulocoracoid, humeri, and much of both hind limbs	A noasaurid theropod	
Mystiornis	M. cyrili	Shestakovo 1	Isolated metatarsus	An avisaurid enantiornithean	
Paraves	Indeterminate		Teeth	May belong to either Microraptorinae or Troodontidae	
Tyrannosauroidea	Indeterminate		Teeth		
Urbacodon	U. cf. sp.		Teeth	A troodontid with unserrated teeth	

== See also ==
- List of pterosaur-bearing stratigraphic units
