= Baidabatyr =

Baidabatyr Temporal range: Barremian–Aptian

Scientific classification
- Kingdom: Animalia
- Phylum: Chordata
- Class: Mammalia
- Order: †Multituberculata
- Genus: †Baidabatyr
- Species: †B. clivosus

Binomial name
- †Baidabatyr clivosus Averianov et al., 2017

Extinct genus of mammals

Baidabatyr is an extinct genus of multituberculate that lived during the Early Cretaceous epoch.

== Distribution ==
Baidabatyr clivosus is known from the Ilek Formation of Krasnoyarsk Krai.
