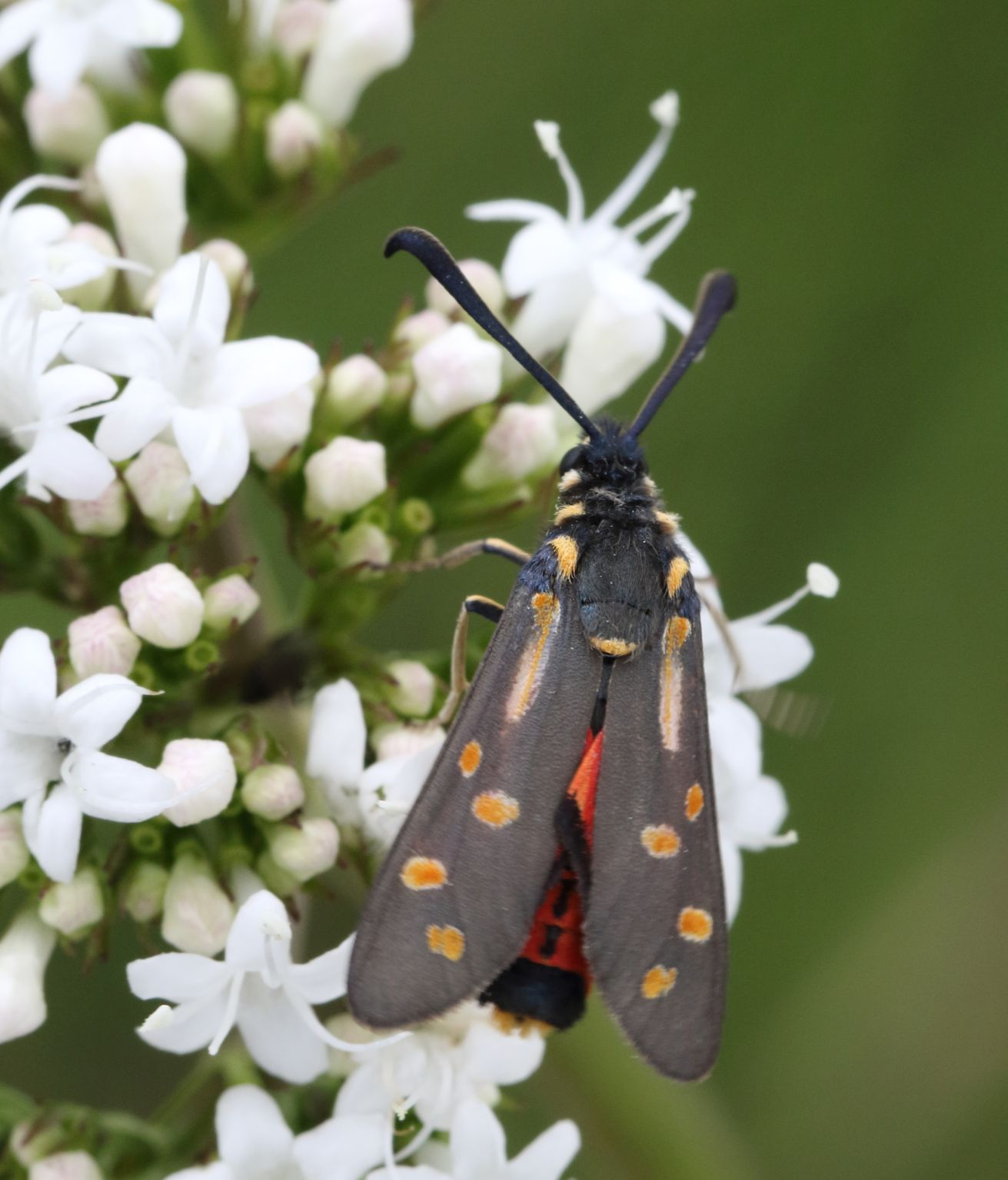

Scientific classification
- Kingdom: Animalia
- Phylum: Arthropoda
- Class: Insecta
- Order: Lepidoptera
- Family: Zygaenidae
- Tribe: Zygaenini
- Genus: Neurosymploca; Wallengren, 1858

= Neurosymploca =

Genus of moths

Neurosymploca is a genus of moths belonging to the family Zygaenidae.

The species of this genus are found in Southern Europe and Southern Africa.

== Species ==
Species:

- Neurosymploca affinis Jordan, 1907
- Neurosymploca caffra Linnaeus, 1764
- Neurosymploca concinna Dalman, 1823
- Neurosymploca dukeorum Hofmann, 2017
- Neurosymploca geertsemai Hofmann, 2017
- Neurosymploca hottentota Herrich-Schäffer, 1854
- Neurosymploca kruegeri Hofmann, 2017
- Neurosymploca kushaica Hofmann, 2017
- Neurosymploca meterythra Hampson, 1919
- Neurosymploca namaqua Boisduval, 1847
- Neurosymploca naumanniola Hofmann, 2017
- Neurosymploca ocellaris Felder & Felder, 1874
- Neurosymploca oligocenica Fernández-Rubio & Nel, 2000
- Neurosymploca pagana Kirby, 1892
- Neurosymploca wallengreni Kirby, 1892
- Neurosymploca zelleri Wallengren, 1860
