= Adzhosuchus =

Adzhosuchus Temporal range: Late Jurassic

Scientific classification
- Kingdom: Animalia
- Phylum: Chordata
- Class: Reptilia
- Clade: Archosauria
- Clade: Pseudosuchia
- Clade: Crocodylomorpha
- Family: †Shartegosuchidae
- Genus: †Adzhosuchus
- Species: †A. fuscus

Binomial name
- †Adzhosuchus fuscus Efimov et al., 2000

Extinct genus of reptiles

Adzhosuchus is an extinct genus of crocodyliform in the family Shartegosuchidae. Fossils have been found from southwestern Mongolia that date back to the Late Jurassic period.
