= Shartegosuchidae =

Shartegosuchidae Temporal range: Late Jurassic - Early Cretaceous

Scientific classification
- Kingdom: Animalia
- Phylum: Chordata
- Class: Reptilia
- Clade: Archosauria
- Clade: Pseudosuchia
- Clade: Crocodylomorpha
- Clade: Solidocrania
- Clade: Crocodyliformes
- Clade: Mesoeucrocodylia
- Clade: †Shartegosuchoidea
- Family: †Shartegosuchidae; Efimov, 1988

Genera
- †Adzhosuchus; †Fruitachampsa; †Kyasuchus; †Nominosuchus; †Shartegosuchus

Extinct family of reptiles

Shartegosuchidae is an extinct family of Late Jurassic and Early Cretaceous crocodyliforms. The family is named after the Late Jurassic Shar Teeg Beds in southwestern Mongolia, from which most shartegosuchid remains have been found. Five genera are currently assigned to Shartegosuchidae: Shartegosuchus, Nominosuchus, Kyasuchus, Adzhosuchus, and Fruitachampsa. Shartegosuchus, Nominosuchus, and Adzhosuchus all come from Shar Teeg, while Kyasuchus is known from the Early Cretaceous of Russia. Fruitachampsa is known from the Late Jurassic Morrison Formation of the western United States.

== Description ==
Shartegosuchids are known only from cranial material, or parts of the skull and some partial skeletons. Shartegosuchids share several distinct characteristics in the skull. On the palate, the choanae (holes where the nasal cavity opens into the mouth) is placed within a deep depression of its midline. The palatal bones, located behind the choanae in what is known as the secondary palate, unite with each other at the midline of the palate. Shartegosuchids can also be diagnosed by the position of the teeth in their lower jaws, which are never found behind the mandibular fenestrae (holes found near the back of the jaw). The edges of the teeth are denticulated, or ridged. The shape and position of several bones of the skull, including the frontal, nasal, lacrimal, and quadrate, are also distinctive. Unlike most other archosaurs, shartegosuchids lack an antorbital fenestra, an opening in the skull in front of the eyes.

== Classification ==
Shartegosuchids are considered to be basal crocodyliforms, but their classification within the group is still debated. At various times since the construction of the family, shartegosuchids have been considered to be protosuchians, mesosuchians, and perhaps notosuchians or atoposaurids.

Fruitachampsa, a crocodylomorph from the Morrison Formation in Colorado, is also referable to Shartegosuchidae. Before it was formally named in 2011, it was commonly known as the "Fruita form". The known material of Fruitachampsa consists of several nearly complete skeletons. It was first classified in the suborder Mesosuchia, which has since been replaced by the clade Mesoeucrocodylia. However, Fruitachampsa can be linked to shartegosuchids on the basis of similarities in the structure of the front of the palate and the choana.

In a 2004 phylogenetic study, Fruitachampsa, along with Gobiosuchus and Zosuchus, was found to be outside Mesoeucrocodylia, but still more derived than Protosuchidae, a family that is often thought to be closely related to shartegosuchids.

A more recent study in 2006 found Shartegosuchidae to be the most basal clade of mesosuchians. A phylogenetic analysis found the family to be monophyletic, meaning that it forms a true clade with a common ancestor from which only shartegosuchids are derived. "Fruitachampsa" was found to be outside Shartegosuchidae, but was the sister taxon of the family. This means that it is more closely related to Shartegosuchidae than any other crocodyliform.

Below is a cladogram based on the 2006 study, showing the relationships of members of the family:

- Mesoeucrocodylia
  - - Metasuchia
    - Hsisosuchus
  - Shartegosuchidae
    - - Nominosuchus matutinus
      - Nominosuchus arcanus
    - - Kyasuchus
      - - Shartegosuchus
        - Adzhosuchus

Below is a cladogram showing the phylogenetic placement of Shartegosuchidae from Clark (2011):

- Crocodyliformes
  - Protosuchidae
  - - - Gobiosuchus
      - Zaraasuchus
    - - Zosuchus
      - Sichuanosuchus
      - Shantungosuchus
      - Shartegosuchidae
        - Nominosuchus
        - - Fruitachampsa
          - - Shartegosuchus
            - Adzhosuchus
      - - Hsisosuchus
        - Mesoeucrocodylia

== Paleobiology ==
The shartegosuchids from Mongolia and Russia comprise a group of crocodyliforms that was endemic to Central Asia during the Mesozoic. These crocodyliforms, along with other Asiatic tetrapods, make up a fauna that may be unique to the region due to geographic isolation that existed since the Late Triassic or Early Jurassic. This isolation first occurred when the supercontinent Pangaea began to break apart, forming the smaller northern supercontinent of Laurasia. The authors of a 2007 study of early crocodylomorphs did not include shartegosuchids in a phylogenetic analysis, indicating that they were so highly endemic to Asia that their relationship to other crocodylomorphs would be difficult to interpret.
