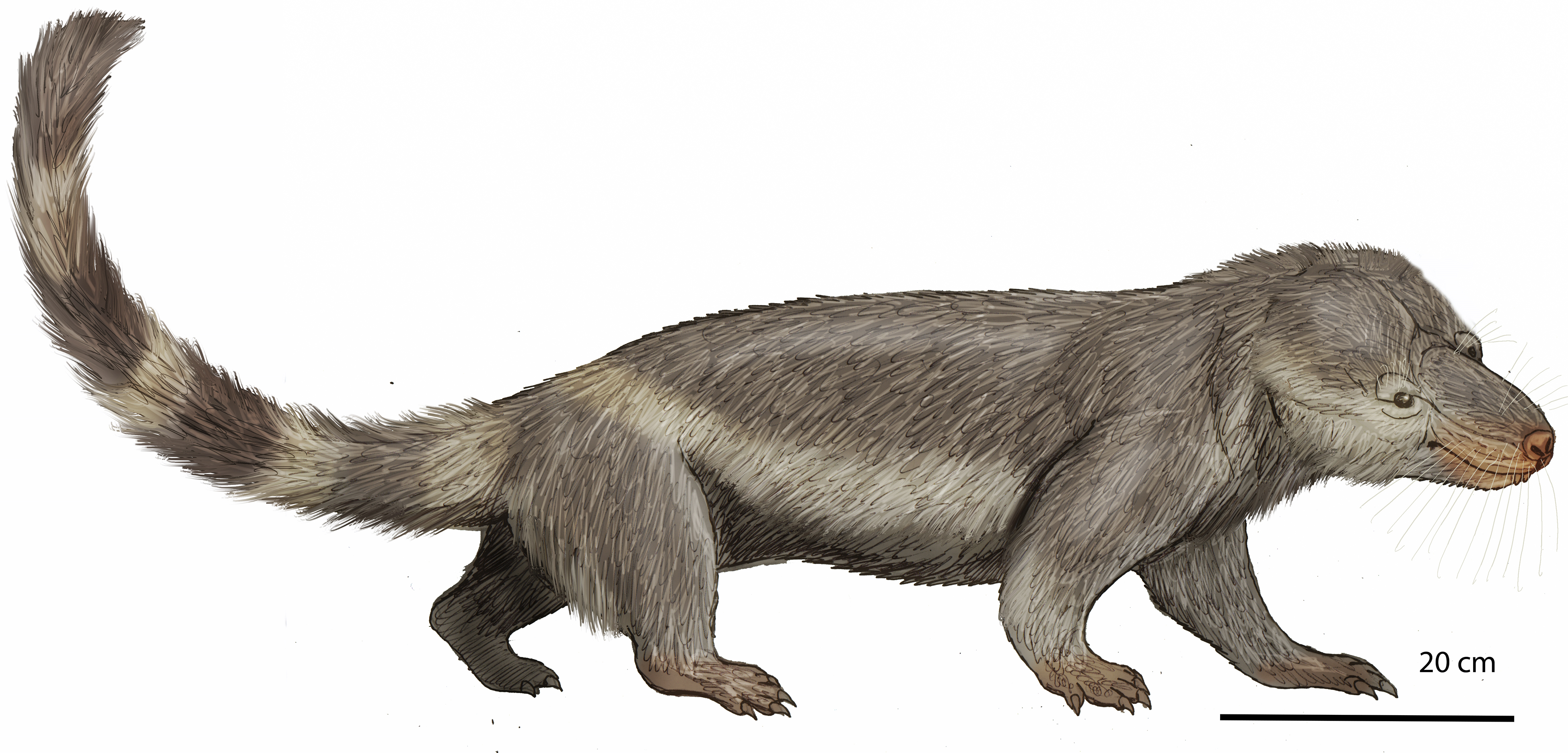
- Life restoration of Tritylodon longaevus

Scientific classification
- Kingdom: Animalia
- Phylum: Chordata
- Clade: Synapsida
- Clade: Therapsida
- Clade: Cynodontia
- Clade: Mammaliamorpha
- Superfamily: †Tritylodontoidea
- Family: †Tritylodontidae; Cope, 1884

Genera
- See below

= Tritylodontidae =

Tritylodontidae Temporal range: Late Triassic – Early Cretaceous Rhaetian–Aptian

Extinct family of cynodonts

Tritylodontidae ("three-knob teeth", named after the shape of their cheek teeth) is an extinct family of small to medium-sized, highly specialized mammal-like cynodonts, with several mammalian traits including erect limbs, endothermy, and some details of the skeleton. They were the last-known family of the non-mammaliaform synapsids, persisting into the Early Cretaceous.

Most tritylodontids are thought to have been herbivorous, feeding on vegetation such as stems, leaves, and roots, although at least one may have had a more omnivorous diet. Tritylodontid fossils are found in the Americas, South Africa, and Eurasia – they appear to have had an almost global distribution, including Antarctica.

== Description ==
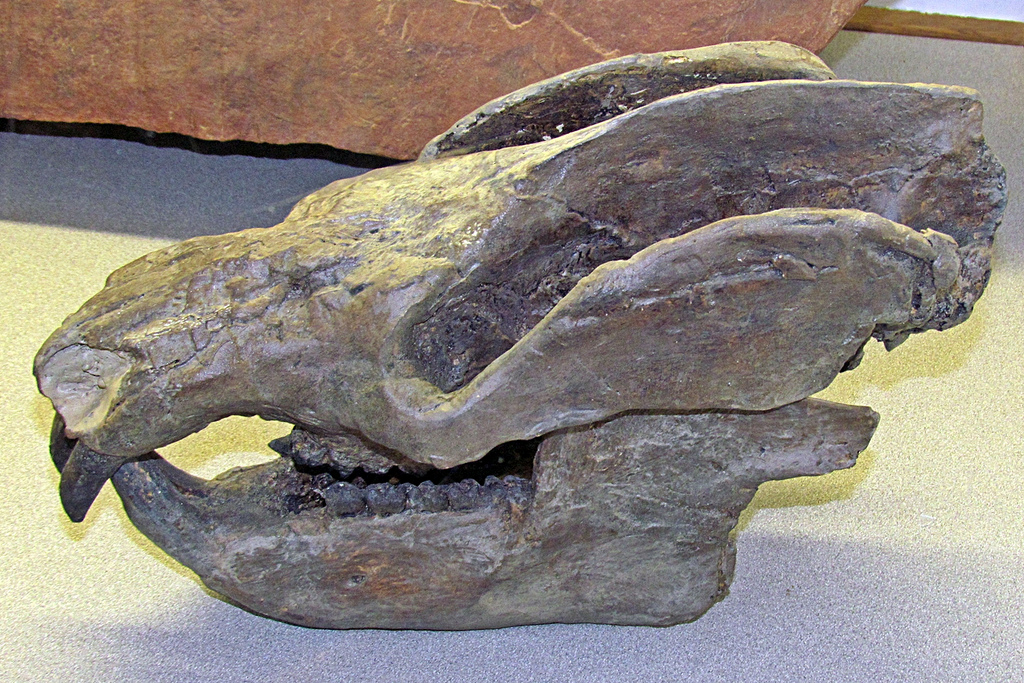
Skull of Kayentatherium wellesi

The skull of tritylodontids had a high sagittal crest. They retained the primitive condition of the joint between the quadrate bone of the skull and the articular bone of the lower jaw – the retention of the joint is one of the reasons they are technically regarded to not be mammals, but are instead non-mammalian mammaliamorphs. The back of the skull had huge zygomatic arches for the attachment of its large jaw muscles. They also had a very well-developed secondary palate. The tritylodont dentition differed from that of most other cynodonts: They did not have canine teeth, and the front pair of incisors were enlarged and were very similar to those of modern-day rodents. Tritylodontids had a large gap, called a diastema, that separated the incisors from their square-shaped cheek teeth. The cheek teeth in the upper jaw had three rows of cusps running along its length, with grooves in between. The lower teeth had two rows of cusps which fitted into the grooves in the upper teeth. The matching of the cusps allowed the teeth to occlude more precisely than in earlier cynodonts. It would grind its food between the teeth in somewhat the same way as a modern rodent, although tritylodontids had a palinal jaw stroke (front-to-back), unlike rodents which have a propalinal jaw stroke (back-to-front). The teeth were well suited for shredding plant matter; however, there is evidence that some tritylodontids had more omnivorous diets, much in the same vein as modern mammals with "herbivore dentitions" like modern rats.

Like mammaliaforms, tritylodontids had epipubic bones, a possible synapomorphy between both clades, and this suggests they may also have laid eggs like modern monotremes, or produced undeveloped fetus-like young like modern marsupials. A recent Kayentatherium shows that they indeed produced undeveloped young, but at litter sizes much larger than any monotreme or marsupial, at around 38 perinates. Tritylodonts were active animals that were likely warm-blooded and possibly burrowed. The small early tritylodontid Oligokyphus has been compared to a weasel or mink, with a long, slim body and tail. In Kayentatherium the burrowing adaptations seen in the skeleton have been re-interpreted as possibly suggesting a semi-aquatic ecology.

== Discovery ==
The first tritylodontid named was Stereognathus, from teeth found in the Middle Jurassic Great Oolite Group of England and the family name was erected by Cope in 1884. Shortly after, another tritylodontid was discovered in the Upper Triassic rocks of South Africa.

In 2023 skulls and teeth from dozens of tritylodonts were discovered at Lake Powell on the Colorado River in the United States, with more discoveries expected which may help to understand the history and evolution of mammals.

== Evolutionary history ==
Tritylodontids first appeared during the Rhaetian, the last stage of the Triassic, and were abundant during the Jurassic, with several records from the Early Cretaceous. The records of the group are almost entirely confined to the Northern Hemisphere, with the only records outside this region being in the Early Jurassic of South Africa and Antarctica. Xenocretosuchus, Montirictus and Fossiomanus are the latest known tritylodontids, from the Barremian-Aptian aged Ilek Formation of Siberia, Kuwajima Formation of Japan, and Yixian Formation of China respectively. The morphology of Fossiomanus indictates it had a specialised fossorial (burrowing) lifestyle.

== Ecology ==
The tooth morphology suggests that tritylodonts were primarily herbivorous, tooth microwear analysis indicates that tritylodonts ate food with low to moderate abrasiveness, and may have also consumed invertebrates.

== Phylogeny ==
Because of their mammal-like appearance, tritylodontids were originally placed within Mammalia. Starting with the work of British paleontologist D.M.S. Watson in 1942, a close relationship was favored between tritylodontids and cynodonts. Watson and other paleontologists noted that tritylodontids lacked the dentary and squamosal jaw articulation that was characteristic of early mammals. Haughton & Brink (1954) were the first to classify tritylodontids within Cynodontia. Later studies identified close similarities between the teeth of tritylodontids and traversodontids, and tritylodontids were eventually thought to be descendants of traversodontids. Under this classification, which was widely accepted in the following decades, Tritylodontidae was previous considered to be part of Gomphodontia, a larger group within Cynognathia. The name Tritylodontoidea was previously used for the group, which traditionally included the families Diademodontidae, Trirachodontidae, Traversodontidae, and Tritylodontidae.

More recently, tritylodontids have been reinterpreted as close relatives of mammals. Beginning with Kemp 1983, Tritylodontidae has been proposed by numerous studies as a member of Probainognathia, the cynodont group containing mammals and related taxa. Gomphodontia is still used for the cynognathian group containing traversodontids and is preferred over Tritylodontoidea now that tritylodontids are not part of it. A phylogenetic analysis performed by Liu & Olsen (2010) places Tritylodontidae very closely to Mammalia, as the sister taxon of the clade formed by Brasilodontidae and Mammalia. Ruta et al. (2013)'s phylogenetic analysis which is partially based on Liu & Olsen (2010) places Tritylodontidae in a more derived position than Brasilodontidae. Below is a cladogram from this analysis.

The exact position of Tritylodontidae in relation to Mammalia is still debated, but most researchers agree they are closely related, usually considering Tritylodontidae to be non-mammaliaform mammaliamorphs.

- Probainognathia
  - Lumkuia
  - - Ecteninion
    - - - Aleodon
        - Chiniquodon
      - - Probainognathus
        - - Trucidocynodon
          - - Therioherpeton
            - - Tritheledontidae
                - Riograndia
                - - - Chaliminia
                    - Elliotherium
                  - - Diarthrognathus
                    - Pachygenelus
              - - Brasilodontidae
                  - Brasilitherium
                  - Brasilodon
                - - Tritylodontidae
                    - Oligokyphus
                    - - Kayentatherium
                      - - Tritylodon
                        - Bienotherium
                  - Mammaliaformes
                    - Sinoconodon
                    - Morganucodon

== Genera ==
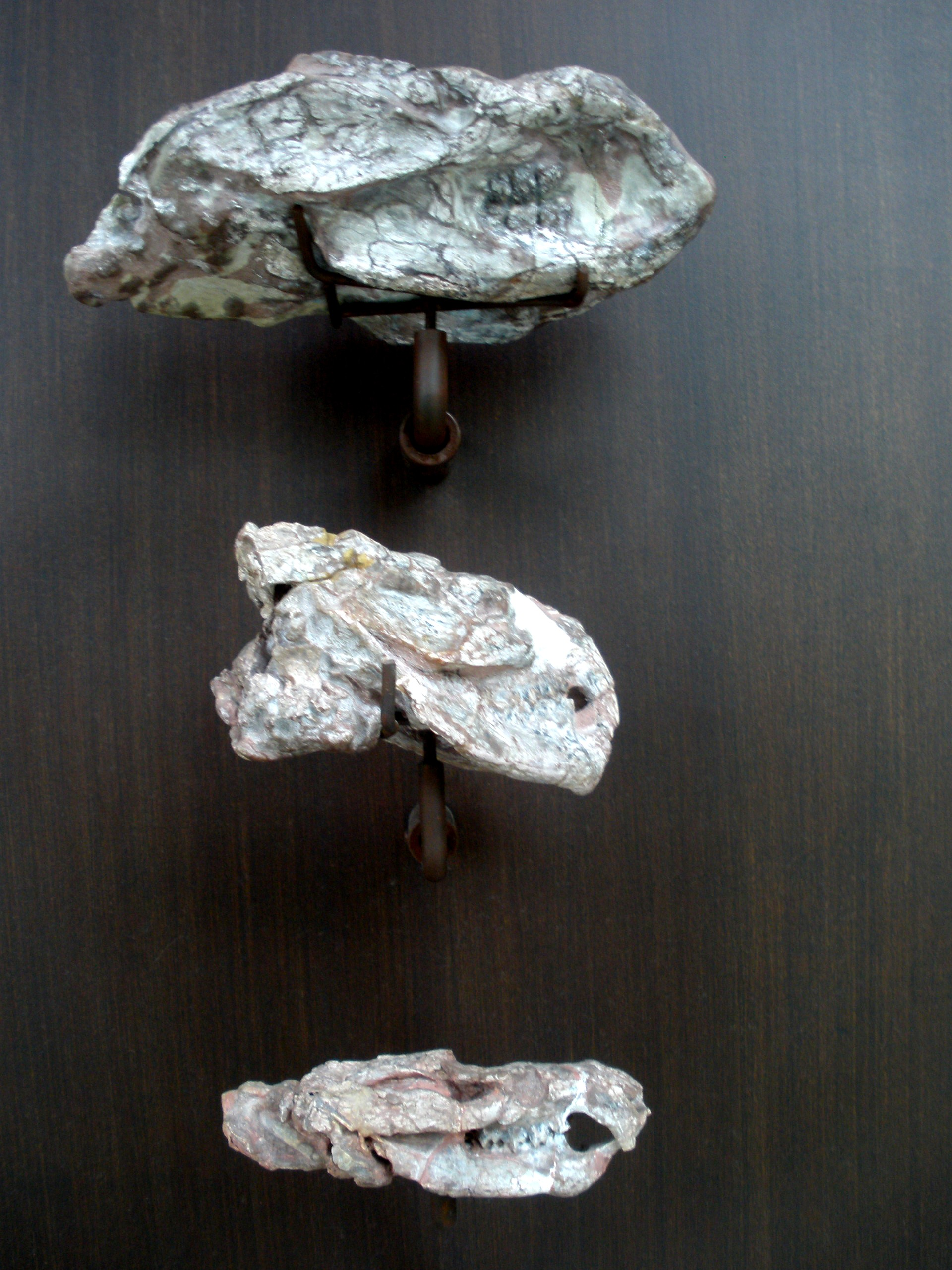
Kayentatherium

- Bienotherium
- Bienotheroides
- Bocatherium
- Dianzhongia
- Dinnebitodon
- Fossiomanus
- Kayentatherium
- Lufengia
- Montirictus
- Nuurtherium
- Oligokyphus
- Polistodon
- Saurodesmus?
- Shartegodon
- Stereognathus
- Tritylodon
- Xenocretosuchus
- Yuanotherium
- Yunnanodon

== See also ==
- Embryonic diapause
