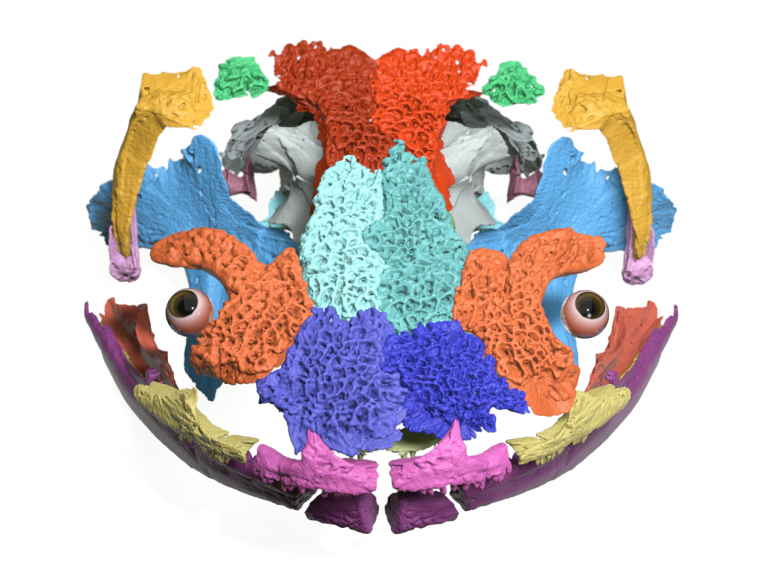
- A digital 3D reconstruction of the skull of Marmorerpeton wakei based on X-ray CT data. They eyes were not preserved and are included to indicate where they would have been located.

Scientific classification
- Kingdom: Animalia
- Phylum: Chordata
- Class: Amphibia
- Family: †Karauridae
- Genus: †Marmorerpeton; Evans et al., 1988

Type species
- †Marmorerpeton freemani Evans et al., 1988

Species
- †M. freemani Evans et al., 1988; †M. kermacki Evans et al. 1988; †M. wakei Jones et al., 2022

= Marmorerpeton =

Marmorerpeton Temporal range: Middle Jurassic, 167.7–164.7 Ma

Extinct genus of salamanders

Marmorerpeton is an extinct genus of prehistoric stem group-salamanders from the Middle Jurassic of the United Kingdom. They are among the oldest known salamanders.

The genus was first described by Susan E. Evans et al. in 1988, when two species were named: M. freemani, and M. kermacki. The material mainly comprised disarticulated vertebrae, partial jaws, and partial skull roofing bones with heavy sculpture. It was recovered via screenwashing from the "Mammal Bed" of Kirtlington Quarry, Oxfordshire. The bed lies near the boundary of the White Limestone Formation and the overlying Forest Marble Formation (the biota from the "Mammal Bed" can be found at Forest Marble Formation#Paleobiota).

Marmorerpeton is a relatively large stem-salamander, and is estimated to have reached at least 40 centimetres (16 in), and possibly 55–60 centimetres (22–24 in). The size of their osteocytic lacunae indicate a large genome size and some morphological characters, such as the presence of calcified cartilage in the medulla of its humerus, suggested that Marmorerpeton was neotenic.

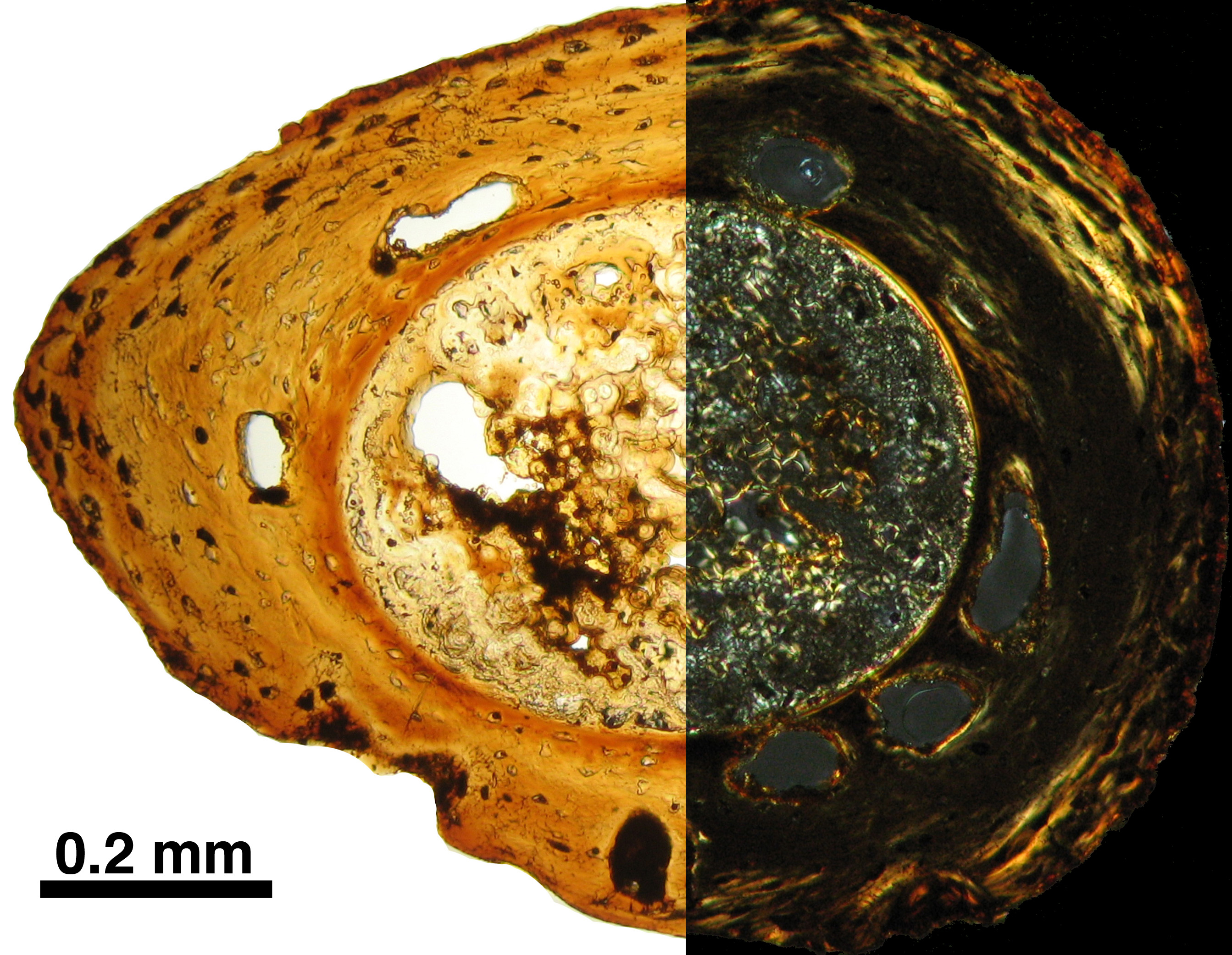
Cross section of a Marmorerpeton femur in normal transmitted (left) and polarized (right) light

Further remains of Marmorerpeton representing a new species, M. wakei, were described in 2022 from the Kilmaluag Formation of the Isle of Skye, Scotland. These remains are partly articulated and include a nearly complete skull, complete tail, partly articulated back bone, and several limb bones. These remains conclusively demonstrated that Marmorerpeton was neotenic, and was a member of the family Karauridae, with the other two members of the family, Karaurus and Kokartus which are known from the Middle-Late Jurassic of Central Asia. The teeth appear to have been weakly pedicellate.
