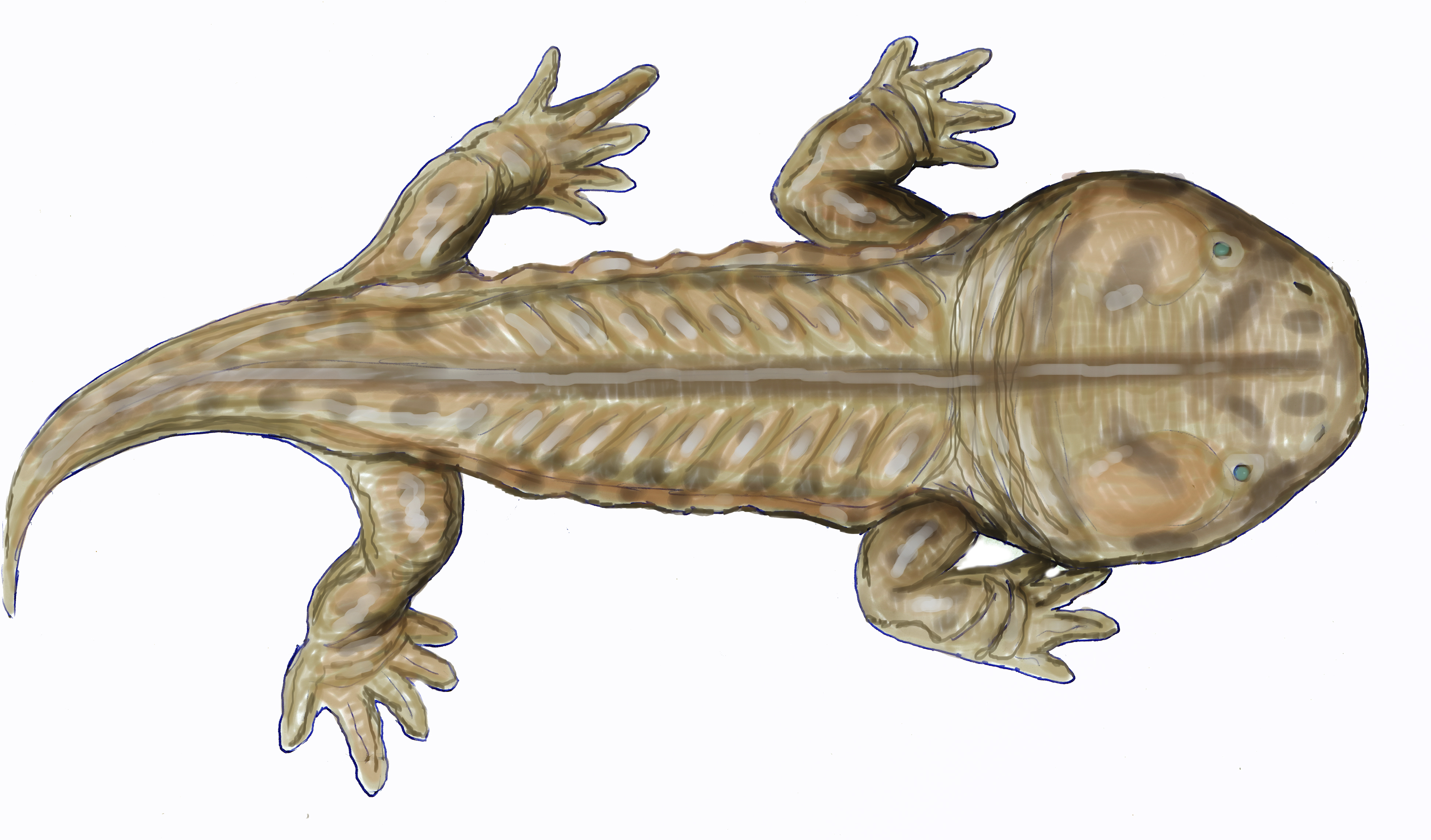
- Life reconstruction of Karaurus sharovi
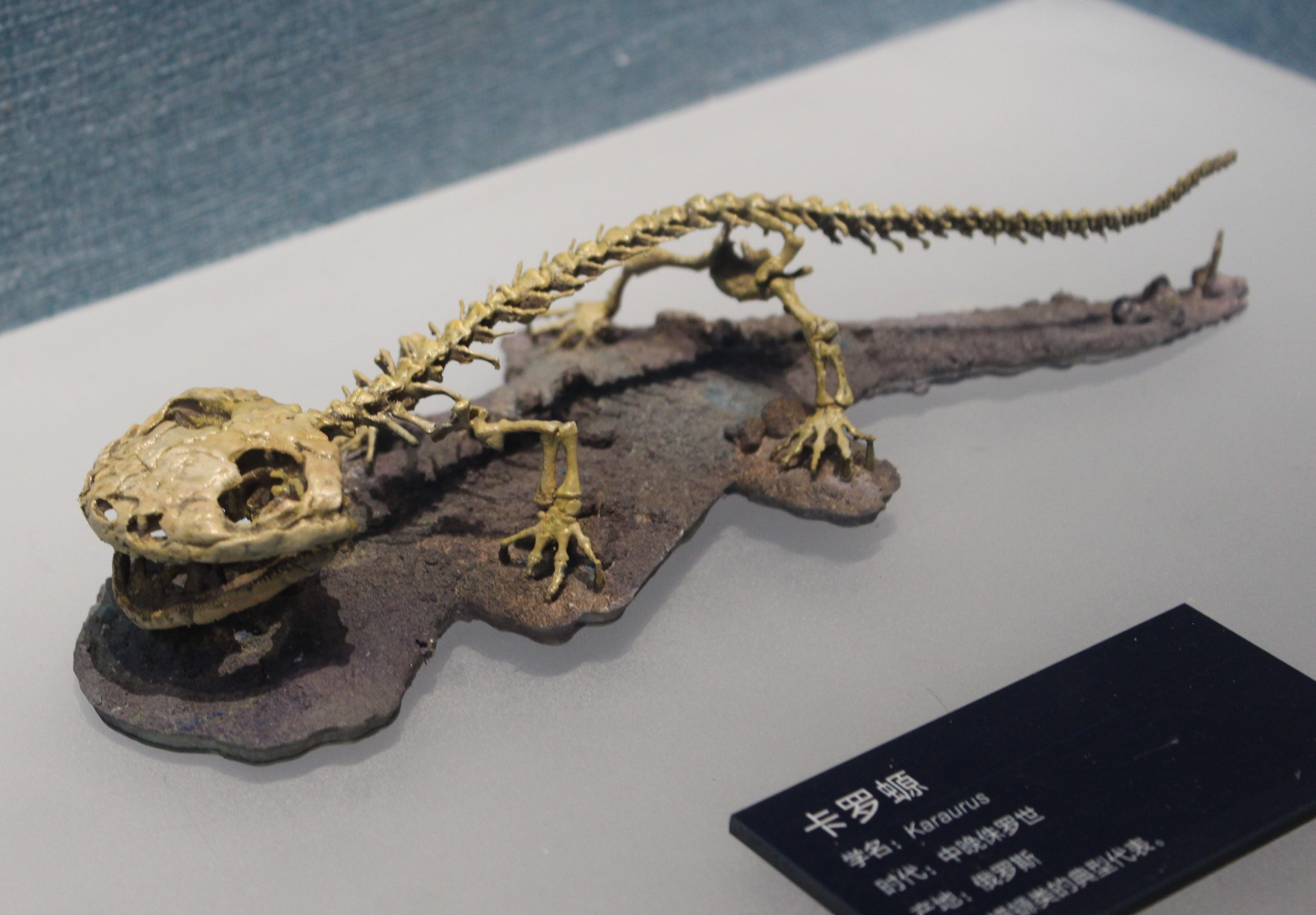
- Reconstructed skeletal mount at the Baoding Natural History Museum

Scientific classification
- Kingdom: Animalia
- Phylum: Chordata
- Class: Amphibia
- Clade: Caudata
- Family: †Karauridae
- Genus: †Karaurus; Ivachnenko, 1978
- Species: †K. sharovi

Binomial name
- †Karaurus sharovi Ivachnenko, 1978

= Karaurus =

Karaurus Temporal range: Late Jurassic 161.2–150.8 Ma

Extinct genus of salamanders

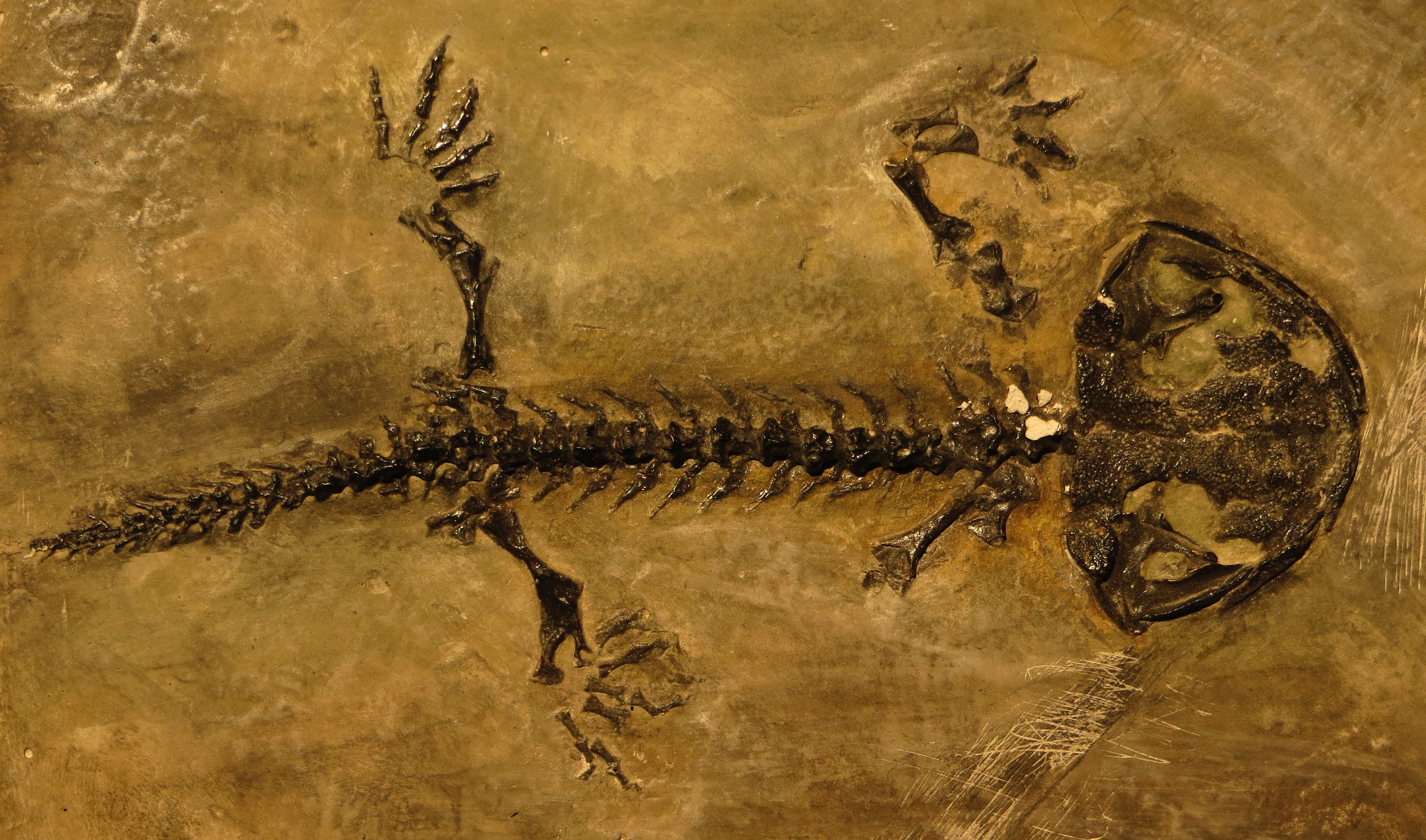
Fossil specimen

Karaurus (meaning head-tail) is an extinct monospecific genus of stem-group salamander (Caudata) from the Middle to Late Jurassic (Callovian (Note: The claim that Karaurus existed in the Callovian (ended 161.5 mya) contradicts the date in the infobox (first appeared 161.3 mya))–Kimmeridgian) Karabastau Formation of Kazakhstan. It is one of the oldest salamanders known.

Karaurus was large for a Jurassic salamander, about 20 centimetres (7.9 in) long, and very similar anatomically to modern salamanders. Karaurus is thought to have fed using suction feeding via the enlargement of the buccal cavity on small fish and invertebrates, with the well-developed palatal dentition (teeth on the roof of the mouth) and marginal teeth mandatory to grasp prey. Karaurus is thought to form a clade with Kokartus from the Middle Jurassic (Bathonian) of Kyrgyzstan, and Marmorerpeton from the Bathonian of the United Kingdom, together forming the Karauridae, which are closely related to crown salamanders. Like other members of Karauridae, Karaurus is neotenic.
