= Woodeaton Quarry =

Quarry in Oxfordshire, England

- Site of Special Scientific Interest
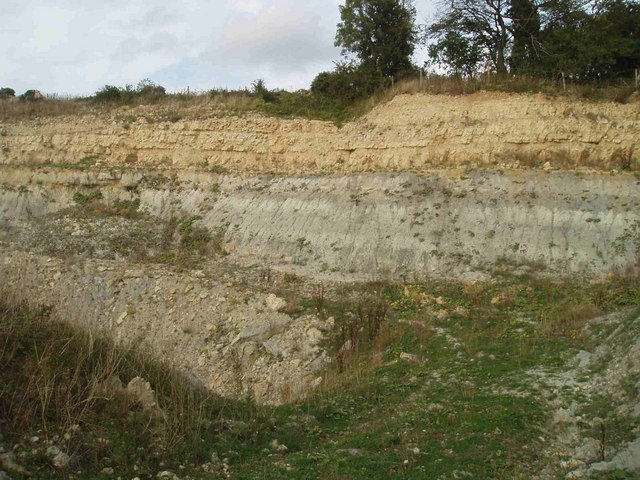
- Location of Woodeaton Quarry.
- Area of search: Oxfordshire
- Grid reference: SP 533 122
- Coordinates: 51.806°N 1.228°W
- Interest: Geological
- Area: 7.3 hectares (18 acres)
- Notification date: 1986
- Location map: Magic Map

Woodeaton Quarry is a 7.3-hectare (18-acre) former quarry and geological Site of Special Scientific Interest north of Oxford in Oxfordshire. It is a Geological Conservation Review site.

This site exposes a sequence of rocks dating to the Middle Jurassic around 167 million years ago belonging to the Great Oolite Group, spanning the Chipping Norton Limestone, Sharp's Hill, Taynton Limestone, Rutland, White Limestone, and Forest Marble formations. It exhibits one of the most complete Bathonian sections in the county, and is described by Natural England as "of great palaeontological and sedimentological interest".
