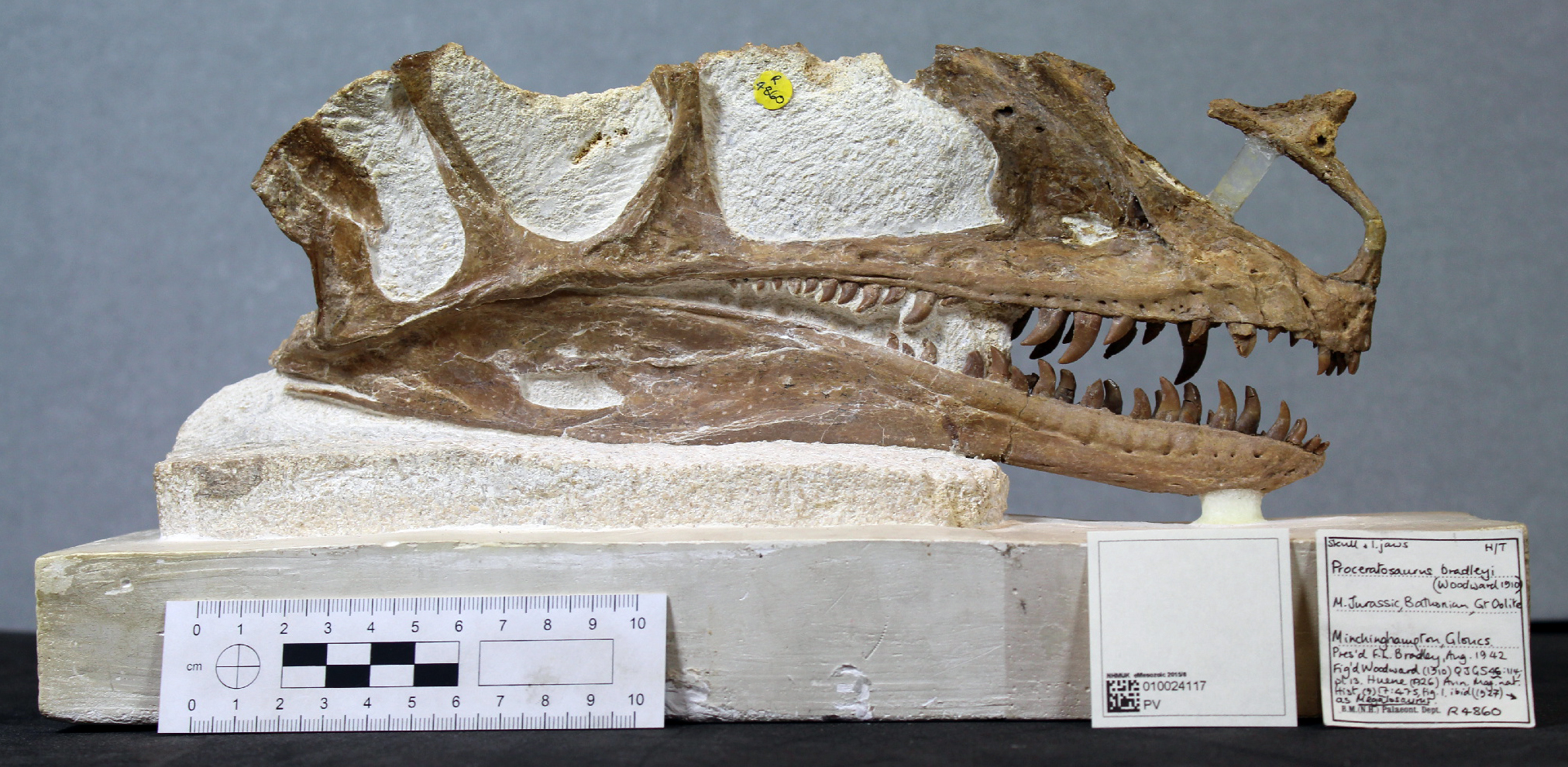
- Right side view of the holotype skull (NHMUK PV R 4860)

Scientific classification
- Kingdom: Animalia
- Phylum: Chordata
- Class: Reptilia
- Clade: Dinosauria
- Clade: Saurischia
- Clade: Theropoda
- Superfamily: †Tyrannosauroidea
- Family: †Proceratosauridae
- Genus: †Proceratosaurus von Huene, 1926
- Species: †P. bradleyi

Binomial name
- †Proceratosaurus bradleyi (Woodward, 1910)

Synonyms
- Megalosaurus bradleyi Woodward, 1910

= Proceratosaurus =

Proceratosaurus Temporal range: Middle Jurassic (Bathonian), 166 Ma

Extinct genus of dinosaurs

Proceratosaurus (/proʊsəˌrætoʊˈsɔːrəs/ proh-sə-RAT-oh-SAW-rəs) is a genus of theropod dinosaur that lived during the Middle Jurassic in what is now England. The holotype and only known specimen consists of a mostly complete skull with an accompanying lower jaw and a hyoid bone, found near Minchinhampton, a town in Gloucestershire. It was originally described in 1910 as a species of Megalosaurus, M. bradleyi, but was moved to its own genus, Proceratosaurus, in 1926. The genus was named for its supposed close relationship with Ceratosaurus, later shown to be erroneous, due to perceived resemblance of Proceratosaurus's incomplete cranial crest to Ceratosaurus's nasal horn.

A small to medium-sized dinosaur, the skull of Proceratosaurus is 26.9 cm (10.6 in) long as preserved, and the dinosaur is estimated to have measured around 3 metres (10 ft) in length. The skull is characterised by a number of distinguishing features, including a cranial crest that begins at the junction between the premaxilla and the nasal bone. The teeth are heterodont, having D-shaped teeth at the front of the upper jaw and flattened serrated teeth in the sides of the jaw. Proceratosaurus is considered a coelurosaur, specifically a member of the family Proceratosauridae, and is among the earliest known members of both Coelurosauria and Tyrannosauroidea (the broader group which includes the tyrannosaurids, including the famous Tyrannosaurus), with its complete crest probably being larger than that of Ceratosaurus and more similar to its close relative Guanlong.

Proceratosaurus is thought to have been a carnivore, with its diet probably consisting of relatively small prey. The crest was probably used for display. The dinosaur is known from the Great Oolite Group of England, having been found in either the White Limestone Formation or the Forest Marble Formation. During the Bathonian age when Proceratosaurus lived, Britain along with the rest of Western Europe formed a subtropical island archipelago, with southern Britain having a seasonally dry climate. Other dinosaurs known from the Bathonian of Britain include the large theropod Megalosaurus bucklandii, the large sauropod Cetiosaurus, as well as indeterminate stegosaurs, ankylosaurs and heterodontosaurids.

== History of discovery ==
In 1910, the British palaeontologist Arthur Smith Woodward reported a partial skull of a theropod dinosaur, discovered some time prior by F. Lewis Bradley during excavation for a reservoir in the vicinity of Minchinhampton, a town in South West England. Bradley had prepared the skull so that the left side was exposed, and submitted it to the Geological Society of London. Woodward made the skull the holotype specimen (the original type specimen with which a species is defined) of a new species of the genus Megalosaurus, naming it M. bradleyi in honour of its discoverer. Megalosaurus, the first named non-bird dinosaur, described in 1824 also based on English fossils, was historically used for any fragmentary remains of large theropods from around the world (wastebasket taxon).

Lithograph of the holotype skull in left side view and close ups of its teeth and hyoid bone, from the original 1910 description

At the time it was discovered, M. bradleyi was one of the most complete theropod skulls known from Europe, possibly with the exception of the crushed and hard to interpret skulls of Compsognathus and Archaeopteryx. Since 1942, the skull has been housed at the Natural History Museum in London, where it is catalogued as specimen NHMUK PV R 4860. The upper part of the skull is missing due to a fissure that had eroded the rock and was partially filled with calcite. While overall well preserved, the skull is somewhat compressed from side-to side compared to what it would have been in life.

In a 1923 publication, the German palaeontologist Friedrich von Huene placed the species in the newly coined genus Proceratosaurus, assuming it was an early member of the Ceratosaurus lineage. The name derives from the Greek pro 'before' and the genus name Ceratosaurus. However, the name was invalidly published as it was only used in a diagram in the paper and not mentioned at all in the main text. Von Huene validated the name three years later in two 1926 articles, which contained the required technical description in order for the name to be considered valid. Von Huene considered the crest, as well as the shape of the maxilla (the main tooth bearing upper jaw bone), squamosal (a bone towards the back of the skull), the external nares (bony nostril openings) and the infratemporal fenestra (the skull opening behind the eye socket) as distinctive. Huene regarded the crest, which he thought to represent the base of a nasal horn, as a feature supporting its relationship with Ceratosaurus.

While remaining one of the best preserved theropod skulls in Europe, and globally one of the best preserved Middle Jurassic theropod skulls, it subsequently received little scientific attention, mainly being mentioned in studies about general aspects of theropod anatomy and evolution. The skull was re-described by the German palaeontologist Oliver Rauhut and colleagues in 2010, undergoing further mechanical preparation using tools to remove the rock encasing the fossil to reveal additional details of the skull, jaw, and teeth, as well as being CT scanned at the University of Texas during the same year.

In 1988, American paleontologist Gregory S. Paul considered the much larger theropod species Piveteausaurus divesensis from the Middle-Late Jurassic of France to belong to Proceratosaurus, coining the new combination Proceratosaurus divesensis. However, later researchers, including Rahut and colleagues in their 2010 redescription, rejected this suggestion, finding the two species to be unrelated.

== Description ==
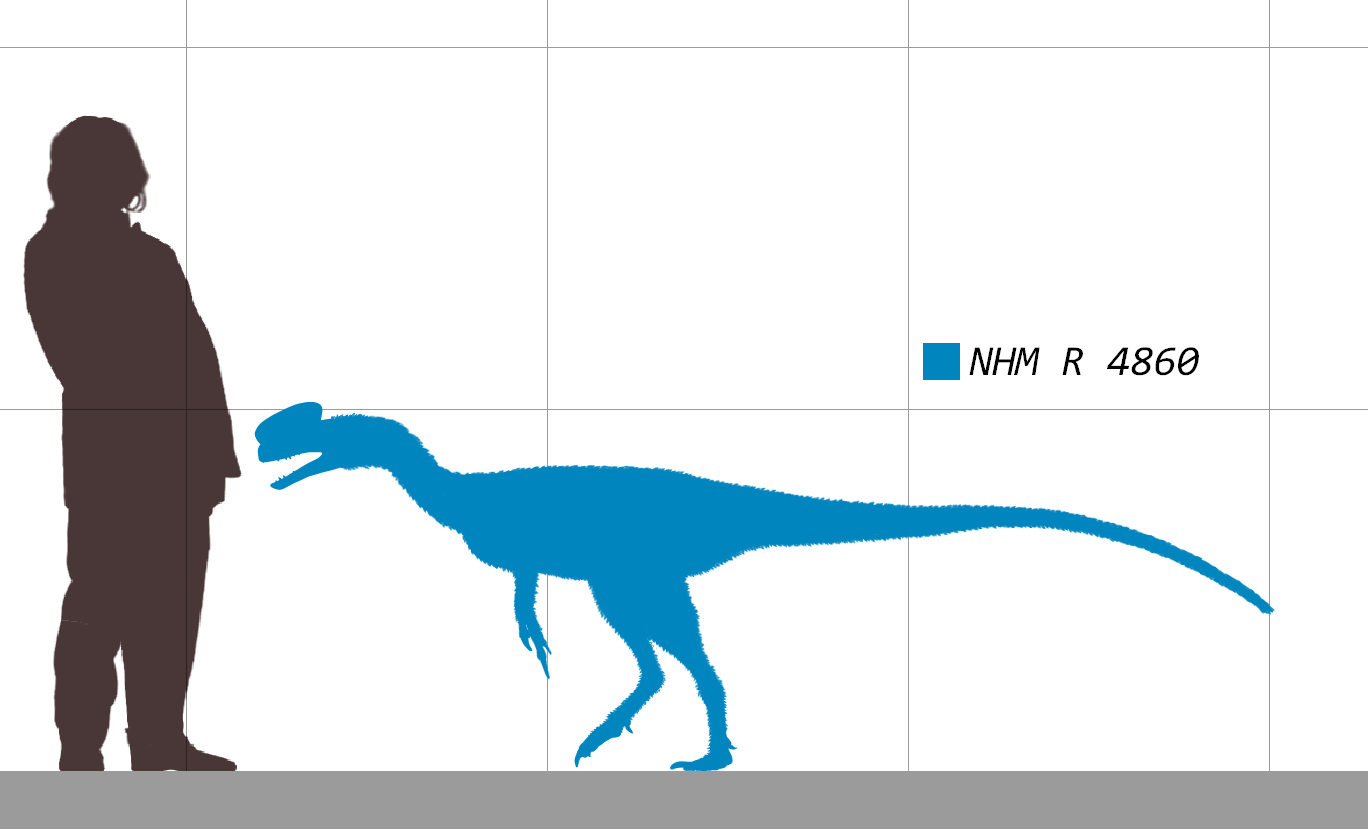
Estimated size compared to a human

The only known skull of Proceratosaurus is 26.9 cm (10.6 in) long as preserved. The 2010 redescription considered it a small to medium-sized dinosaur, and estimated a total body length of 2.98–3.16 m (9.8–10.4 ft) and a body mass of 28–36 kg (62–79 lb) for the holotype individual, which was likely at least a subadult. Other sources gave estimates of 3–4 m (9.8–13.1 ft) in length and 50–100 kg (110–220 lb) in body mass. Well preserved fossils of the related tyrannosauroids Yutyrannus and Dilong indicate that they were covered in relatively simple feathers in life, similar to the down feathers of modern birds, and according to British paleontologist Dave Hone "it is reasonable to infer" that all tyrannosauroids had similar feathers.

When complete, the skull of Proceratosaurus appears to have been relatively long but not particularly deep, being more than three times longer than high. The external naris (the opening at the front of the skull from which the nostril originates), makes up around 20% of the skull length, measured to be around 7 cm (2.8 in) in maximum length, relatively large compared to the size of the skull. The maximum length of the nares is inclined upwards towards the back of the skull (posterodorsally) at an angle of approximately 30 degrees, differing from that of the closely related Guanlong, where the maximum length of the nares is roughly horizontal relative to the skull length. The antorbital fenestra (the large opening in front of the eye) is roughly triangular in shape, with a maximum length of 6.9–7.1 cm (2.7–2.8 in), and as is found in other theropods, this fenestra is also surrounded by a large fossa (depression) extending onto the surrounding skull bones. On the maxilla, the forward edge of the fossa extends considerably further forward (anterior) and below (ventral) the promaxillary foramen (a hole in the skull), a unique and distinctive characteristic (autapomorphy) of this species. The partially preserved orbit (eye socket) has an inverted egg-shape, and was probably marginally taller than long when complete, with a maximum estimated complete height of 6 cm (2.4 in), and a measured length of 5.55 cm (2.19 in). The infratemporal fenestra is narrow and elongate, being around 5.4 cm (2.1 in) tall and kidney-shaped, and slightly constricted at its midpoint.

Skull anatomy of proceratosaurids

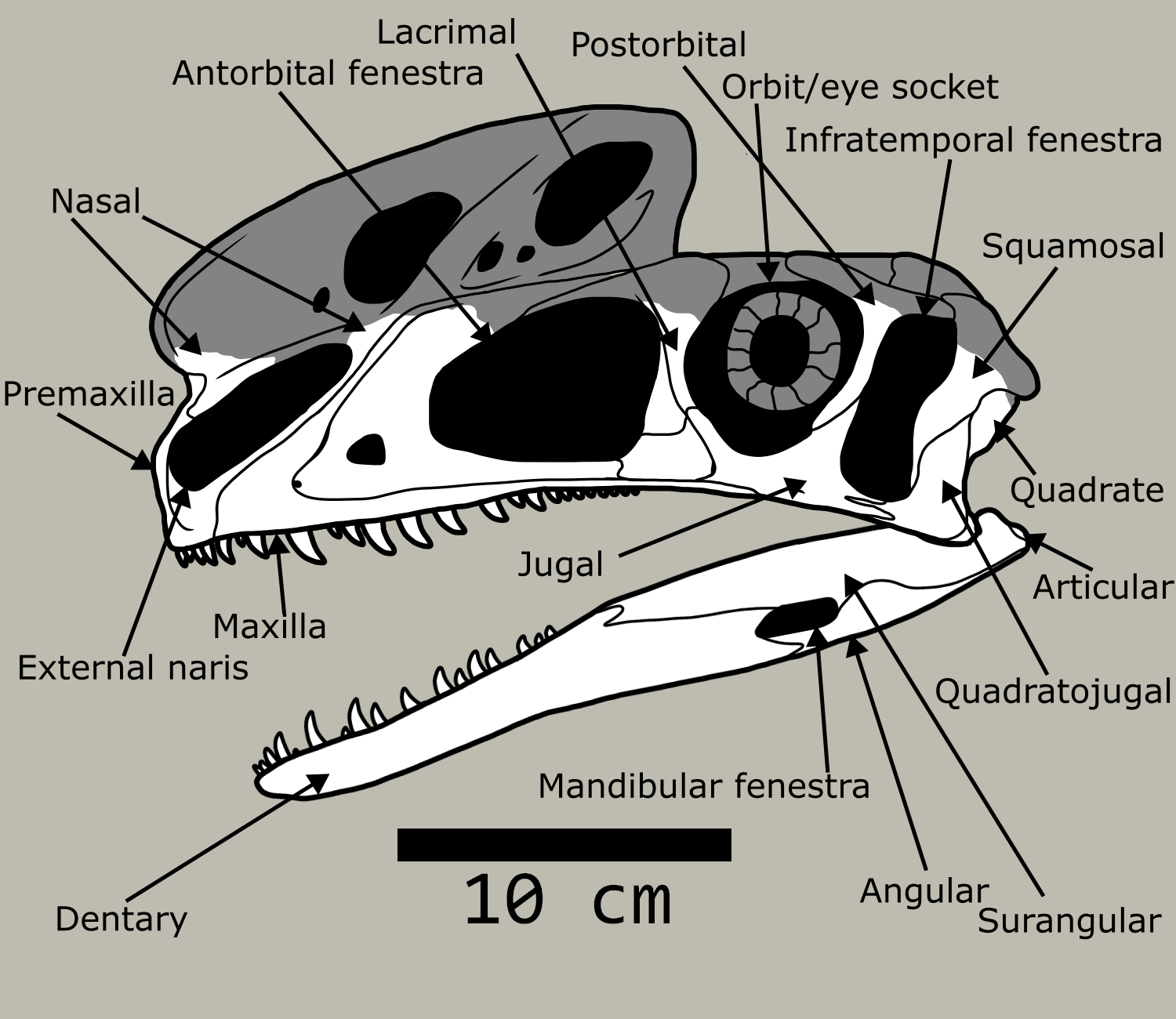
Diagram of the skull showing known parts in white, with missing parts of the skull reconstructed after Guanlong

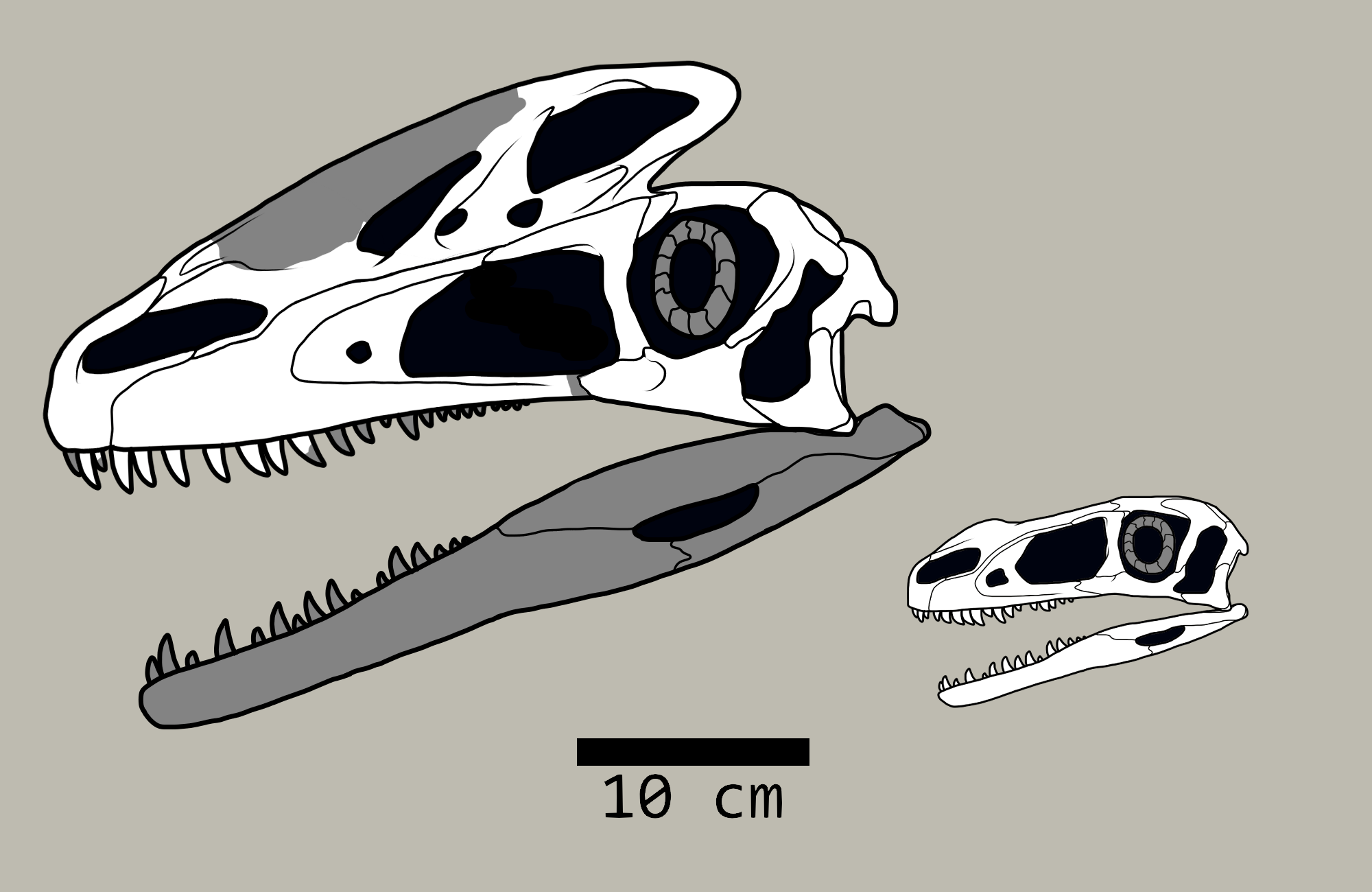
Skull diagram of Guanlong including an adult specimen (IVPP V14531, left) and a juvenile (IVPP V14532, right). Preserved parts are in white, with reconstructed parts in grey.

The premaxilla (the frontmost bone of the upper jaw) is relatively small, forming a rounded end to the snout. The nasal bones, as well as the contacting upper back edge of the premaxillae to their front, bear the partially preserved base of a crest. The preserved part of the crest overhangs the internarial bar that forms the upper part of the bony nostril, a distinguishing feature of this genus. Like other proceratosaurids, Proceratosaurus probably had a large pneumatic (hollow) crest that ran along the midline of the skull, which may have been covered by keratin. The shape of the complete crest is unknown and was previously thought to be similar to that of Ceratosaurus, but after the discovery of the close, crested relative Guanlong, that genus has since been considered a likely model. The maxilla (the main tooth bearing bone of the upper jaw) is long, around 16.3 cm (6.4 in) in length, probably over 50% of the total complete skull length. The front portion of the maxilla forward of the antorbital fenestra differs considerably in shape from its counterpart in Guanlong. In contrast to Guanlong, the jugal bone of the skull makes little contribution to the border (outer edge) of the antorbital fenestra in Proceratosaurus.

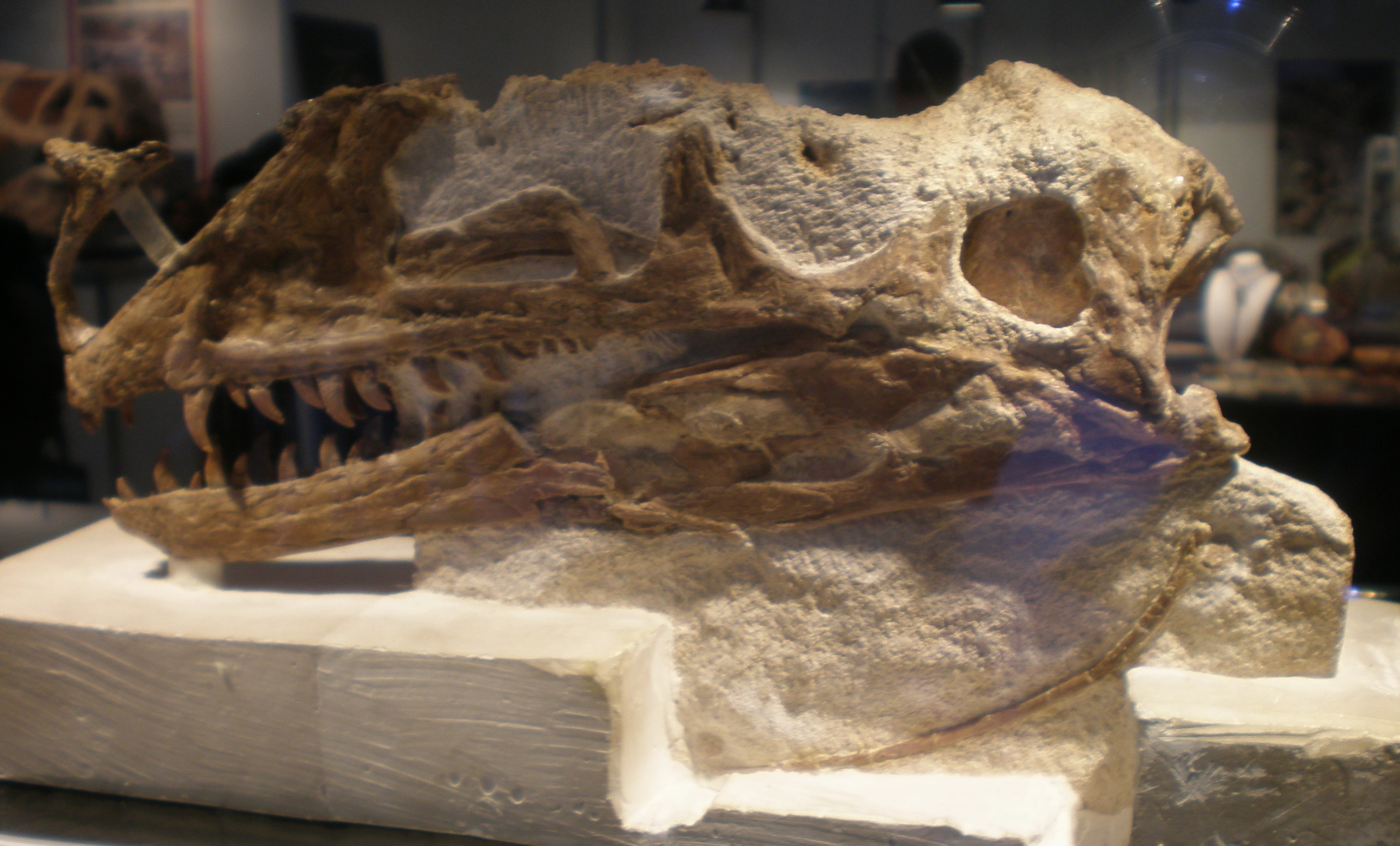
Holotype skull shown from the left

The mandible (lower jaw) of Proceratosaurus is 26 cm (10 in) long, somewhat shorter than the skull, which is unusual for theropods. The retroarticular process at the posterior end of the mandible where the lower jaw articulates with the skull is relatively short. The dentary bone (the tooth-bearing front portion of the mandible) is slender, though it becomes considerably wider towards the rear, which bears a large, elongate mandibular fenestra (opening), with a length of 2.6 cm (1.0 in). The dentary bone tapers to a blunt point towards the front. Although not all teeth are preserved, the tooth sockets show that each premaxilla had around 4 teeth, each maxilla had around 22 teeth, and each dentary had around 20 teeth. The teeth are heterodont, showing differences in morphology depending on their position in the jaw. The premaxillary teeth are D-shaped in cross-section, with the front facing surface of the teeth being arched. The maxillary teeth, like those of many other theropods, are ziphodont, that is they are narrow from side-to-side and serrated, as is typical of carnivorous members of Archosauria. The three frontmost pairs of teeth of the lower jaw are procumbent, that is they protrude forwards. The denticles are rounded and chisel-like in shape. The density of denticles is highest in the frontmost teeth in both the upper and lower jaws. In the teeth further back, denticle density increases in the posteriormost teeth of the maxilla but remains constant in the dentary.

The preserved left hyoid (a bone that supported the tongue) is around 12 cm (4.7 in) long along its curved length. The central part of the shaft is relatively straight, while the posterior and front ends are flexed upwards.

== Classification ==
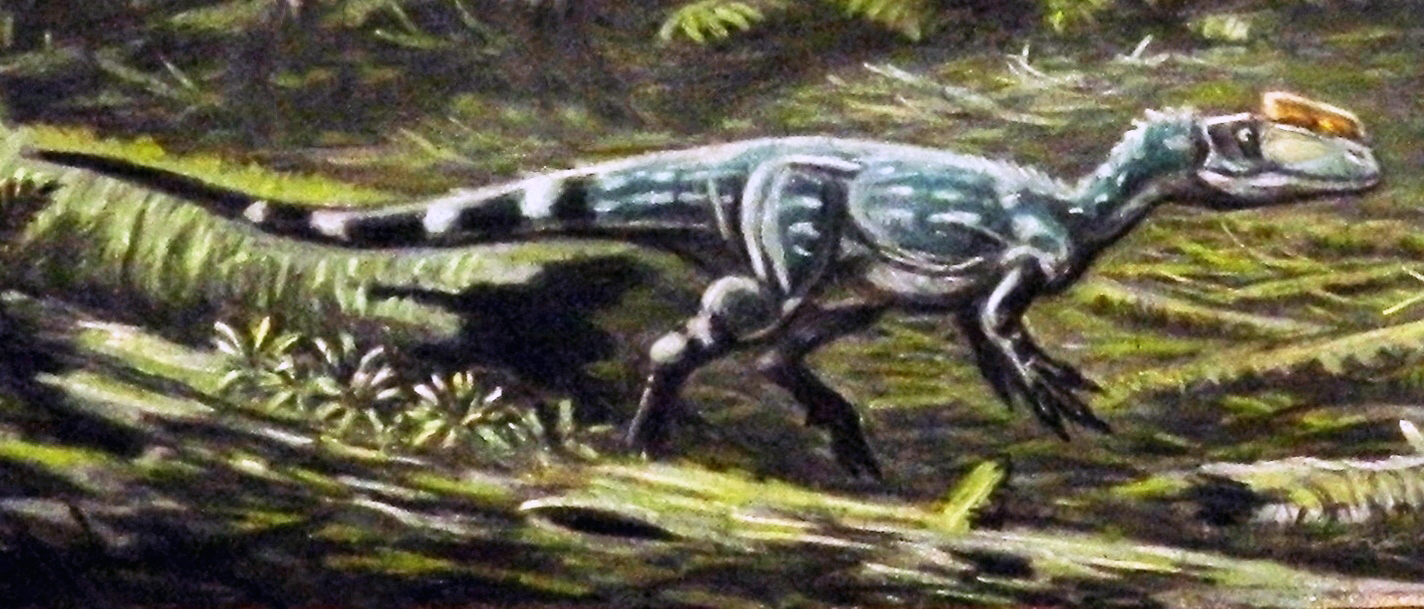
Hypothetical life restoration showing speculative complete crest-shape, similar to that of Guanlong

Woodward classified Proceratosaurus as a species of Megalosaurus in his 1910 description, because both had four premaxillary teeth. This trait was later shown to be the ancestral condition found in the common ancestor of all theropod dinosaurs, and thus not a distinguishing characteristic. Studies during the 1930s by von Huene suggested a closer relationship with Ceratosaurus, and he thought both dinosaurs represented members of the group Coelurosauria.

It was not until the late 1980s, after Ceratosaurus had been shown to be a much more basal (early diverging) theropod and not a coelurosaur, that the classification of Proceratosaurus was re-examined. Paul suggested in 1988 that it was a close relative of Ornitholestes, again mainly because of the crest on the nose (though the idea that Ornitholestes bore a nasal crest was later disproved). Paul considered both Proceratosaurus and Ornitholestes to be neither ceratosaurs nor coelurosaurs, but instead primitive allosauroids.

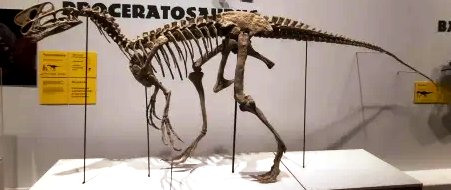
Skeletal mount of Proceratosaurus with hypothetical crest shape and skeleton, Worcester Museum

A 1998 phylogenetic analysis by American paleontologist Thomas R. Holtz Jr. found Proceratosaurus to be a basal coelurosaur. Several subsequent studies confirmed this, finding Proceratosaurus and Ornitholestes only distantly related to ceratosaurids and allosauroids, though one opinion published in 2000 considered Proceratosaurus a ceratosaurid without presenting supporting evidence. A 2004 study by Holtz and colleagues also placed Proceratosaurus among the coelurosaurs, though with only weak support, and again found an (also weakly supported) close relationship with Ornitholestes.

The first major re-evaluation of Proceratosaurus and its relationships was published in 2010 by Oliver Rauhut and colleagues. Their study concluded that Proceratosaurus was in fact a coelurosaur, and moreover a tyrannosauroid, an early diverging member of the lineage culminating in the large tyrannosaurids of the Late Cretaceous. Furthermore, they found that Proceratosaurus was most closely related to the tyrannosauroid Guanlong from the Late Jurassic of China. They named the clade containing these two dinosaurs Proceratosauridae, defined as all theropods closer to Proceratosaurus than to Tyrannosaurus, Allosaurus, Compsognathus, Coelurus, Ornithomimus, or Deinonychus. Proceratosaurus is currently the oldest known tyrannosauroid, along with Kileskus, which is known from equivalently aged rocks in Western Siberia. The fossil record of early coelurosaurians and their initial diversification is sparse, and it has previously been disputed whether coelurosaurian dinosaurs had suddenly radiated at the Middle–Late Jurassic boundary, or gradually during the late Early Jurassic – Middle Jurassic. The presence of tyrannosauroids such as Proceratosaurus in the Bathonian implies that the initial diversification of Coelurosauria had already considerably progressed by the early Middle Jurassic.

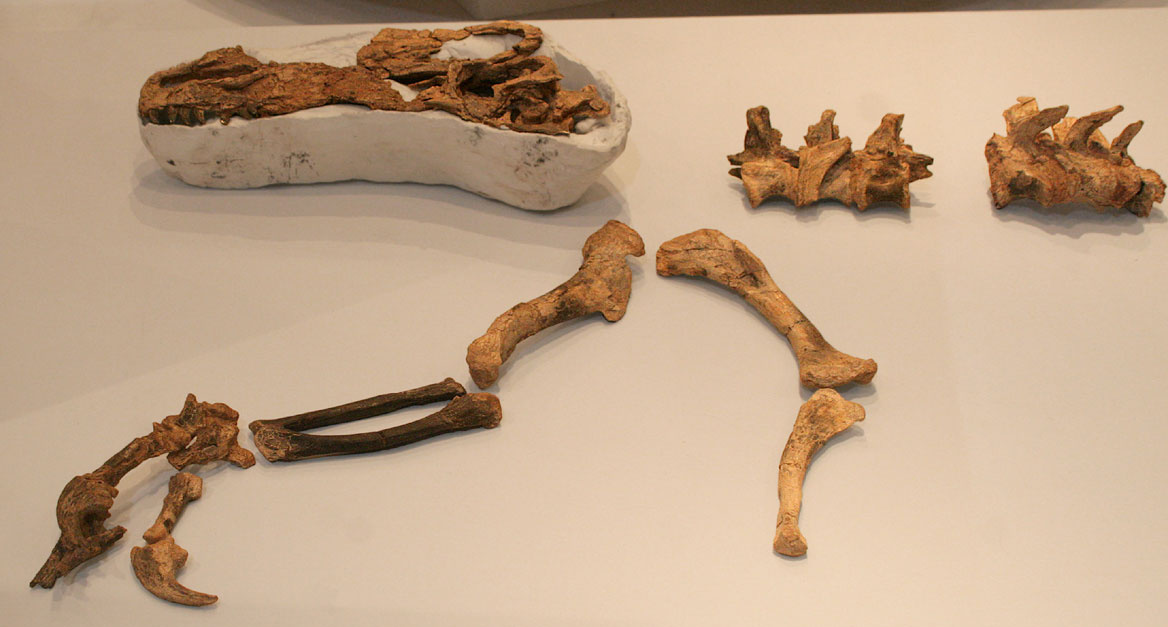
Specimen of the related Guanlong with better preserved crest

Subsequent published analyses have consistently recovered Proceratosaurus in a close relationship with Guanlong, as well as the genera Kileskus and Sinotyrannus. Other genera which may be close relatives include Yutyrannus, Dilong, and Stokesosaurus, but the exact affinities of these taxa as they relate to Proceratosaurus remain uncertain. Below is a cladogram from a 2022 study by British paleontologist Darren Naish and Italian paleontologist Andrea Cau on the genus Eotyrannus, which recovered similar relationships to previous studies.

- Tyrannosauroidea
  - - Juratyrant
    - Stokesosaurus
  - - Coeluridae
    - - Proceratosauridae
        - Dilong
        - - Guanlong
          - - Proceratosaurus
            - Sinotyrannus
      - Pantyrannosauria
        - Yutyrannus
        - - Eotyrannus
          - - Xiongguanlong
            - - Megaraptora
              - Eutyrannosauria

== Palaeobiology ==
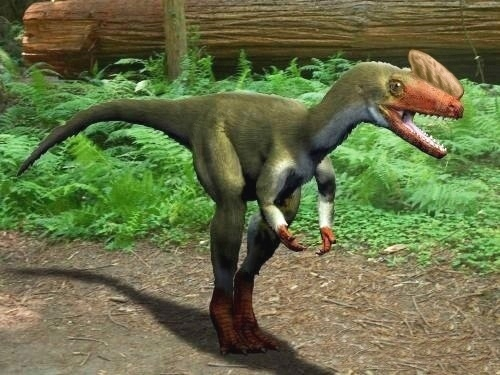
Hypothetical life restoration of Proceratosaurus in a forested environment

The study of the general biology of Proceratosaurus is limited by the lack of postcranial remains. However, the better-understood anatomy of the related Guanlong allows for general inferences about the biology of Proceratosauridae as a whole. As is ancestral for theropods, all tyrannosauroids, including proceratosaurids like Proceratosaurus, are thought to have been carnivores. Proceratosaurids such as Guanlong differ from tyrannosaurids like Tyrannosaurus in the possession of relatively large and powerfully built forelimbs, suggesting that they were used in capturing and holding prey, unlike in Late Cretaceous tyrannosaurids which have relatively small forelimbs, who are thought to have relied on their heads in combination with a muscular neck to capture and kill prey. In spite of this, proceratosaurids possessed many of the key adaptations of Cretaceous tyrannosaurids. In particular, proceratosaurids already possessed the fused nasal bones that were inherited by their successors. In later forms, the fusion of the left and right nasal bones is believed to have been an adaptation for withstanding higher bite forces. Proceratosaurus also possessed the characteristic "D-shaped" premaxillary teeth that are unique to tyrannosauroids. According to Rauhut and colleagues in 2010, this suite of adaptations indicates that the "puncture-pull" feeding strategy of tyrannosaurids was already present in proceratosaurids. In the "puncture-pull" strategy, which was likely exhibited by many coelurosaurian theropods, following closure of the jaws around prey, the head was pulled back, causing the theropod's teeth to slice through the held flesh to rip it away from the body of the prey.

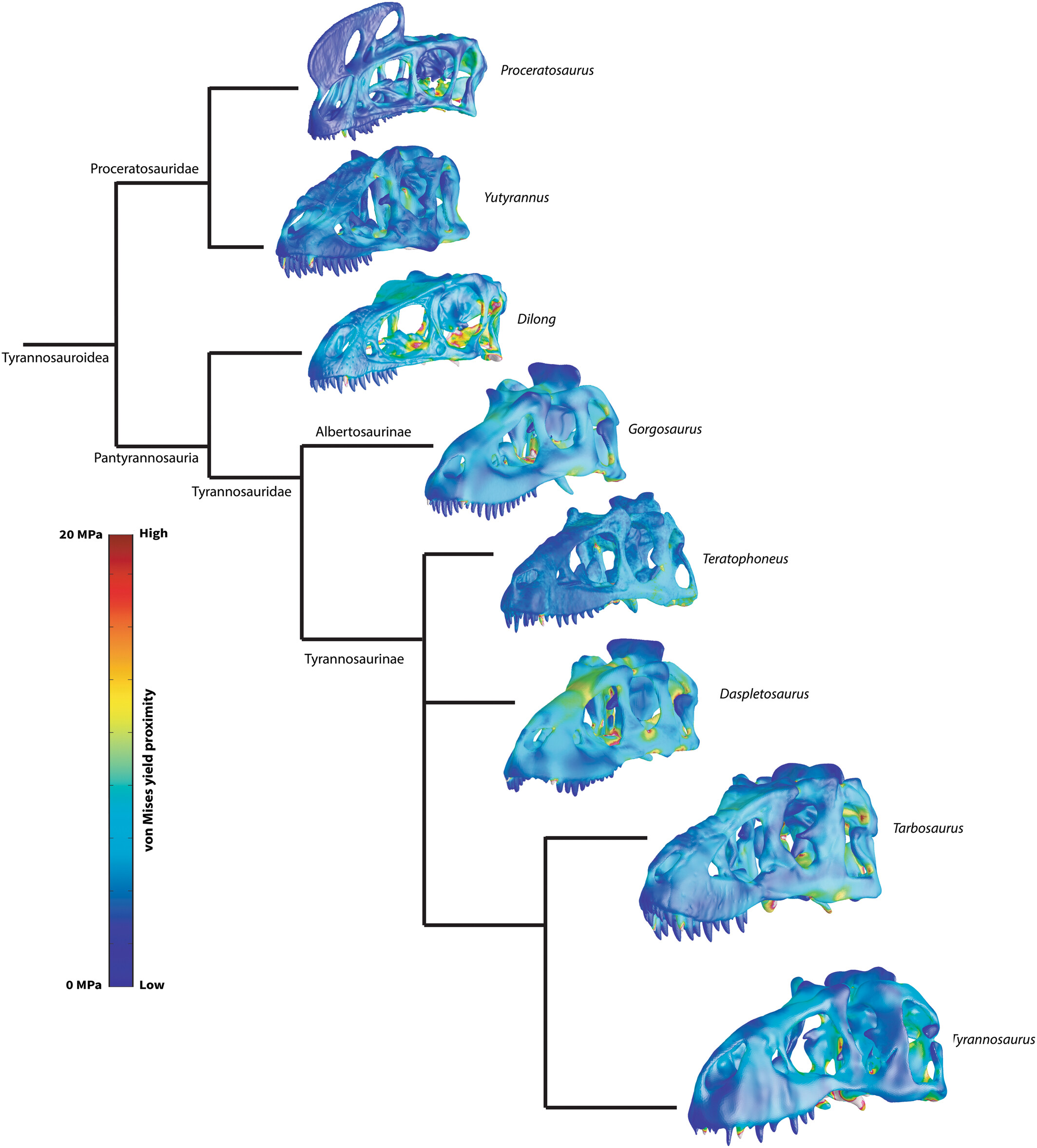
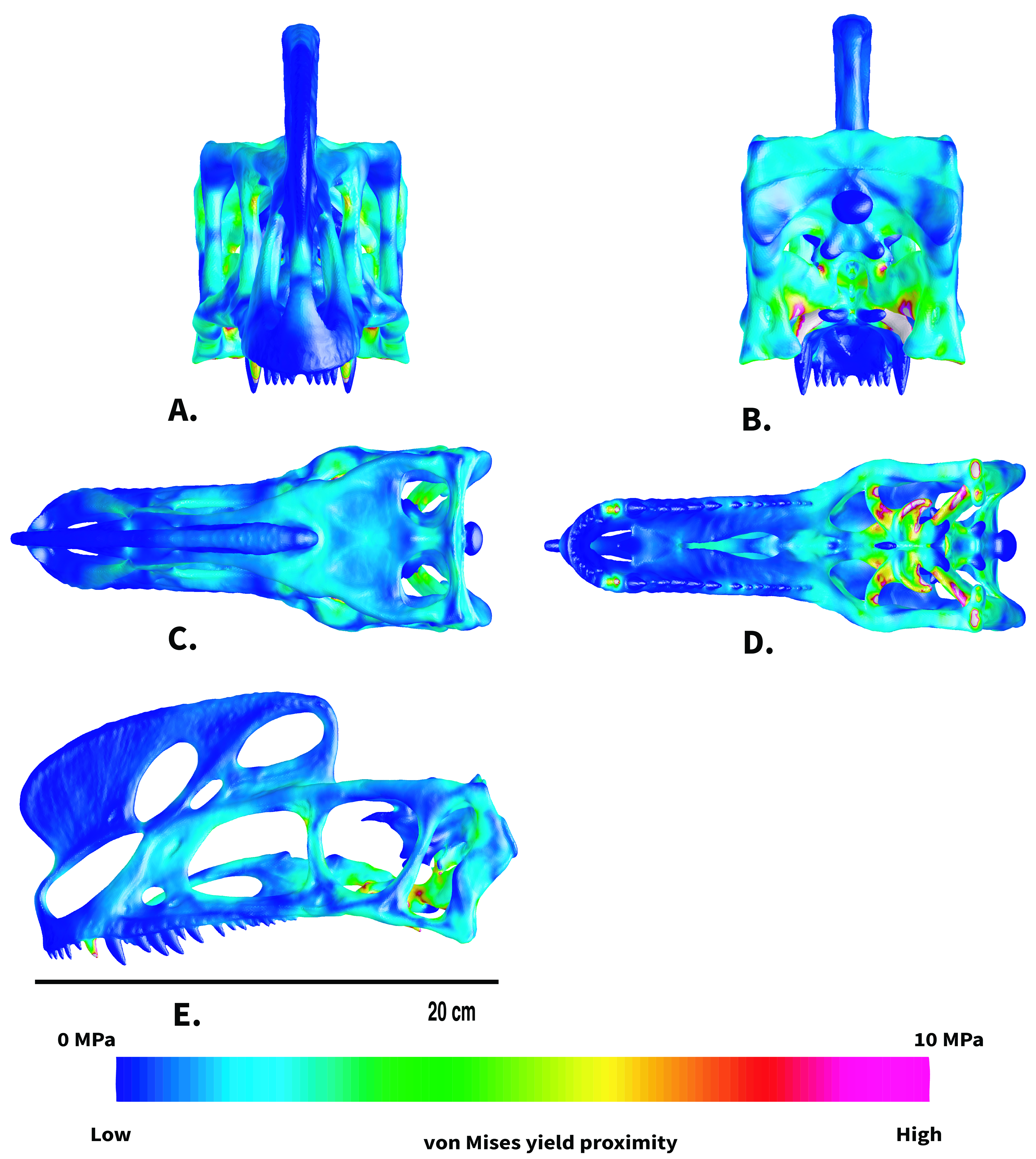
Left: comparison of cranial stress for Proceratosaurus (top) with other tyrannosauroids. Right: biting stresses in reconstructed skull of Proceratosaurus in various views. Following a 2023 study

A 2023 study by the American palaeontologist Evan Johnson-Ransom and colleagues used data from the skulls of Proceratosaurus and Guanlong to create a virtual composite model of a hypothetical, complete Proceratosaurus skull, and created other virtual skull models for other tyrannosauroids. They added simulated muscles to these model skulls to estimate the highest possible bite force. Their model for Proceratosaurus exhibited an estimated bite force of 390 N (88 lbf), comparable to Dilong, but much lower than those of adult tyrannosaurids. Their results suggested that the skull of Proceratosaurus had a proportionately lower ability to withstand stresses than those of tyrannosaurids, contributing to their low bite force. The crest may have helped to redistribute stress and buttress the skull when biting. The low bite force in combination with the morphology of the skull suggests that Proceratosaurus most likely fed on small-bodied prey. Some of the teeth on the lower jaw of the Proceratosaurus holotype display damage likely caused during feeding.

According to Rauhut and colleagues, the prominent head crest of Proceratosaurus was also likely to have been used as a display feature. Paul agreed in a 2016 popular book, pointing out that the crest would have been too delicate for head-butting.

== Palaeoenvironment ==
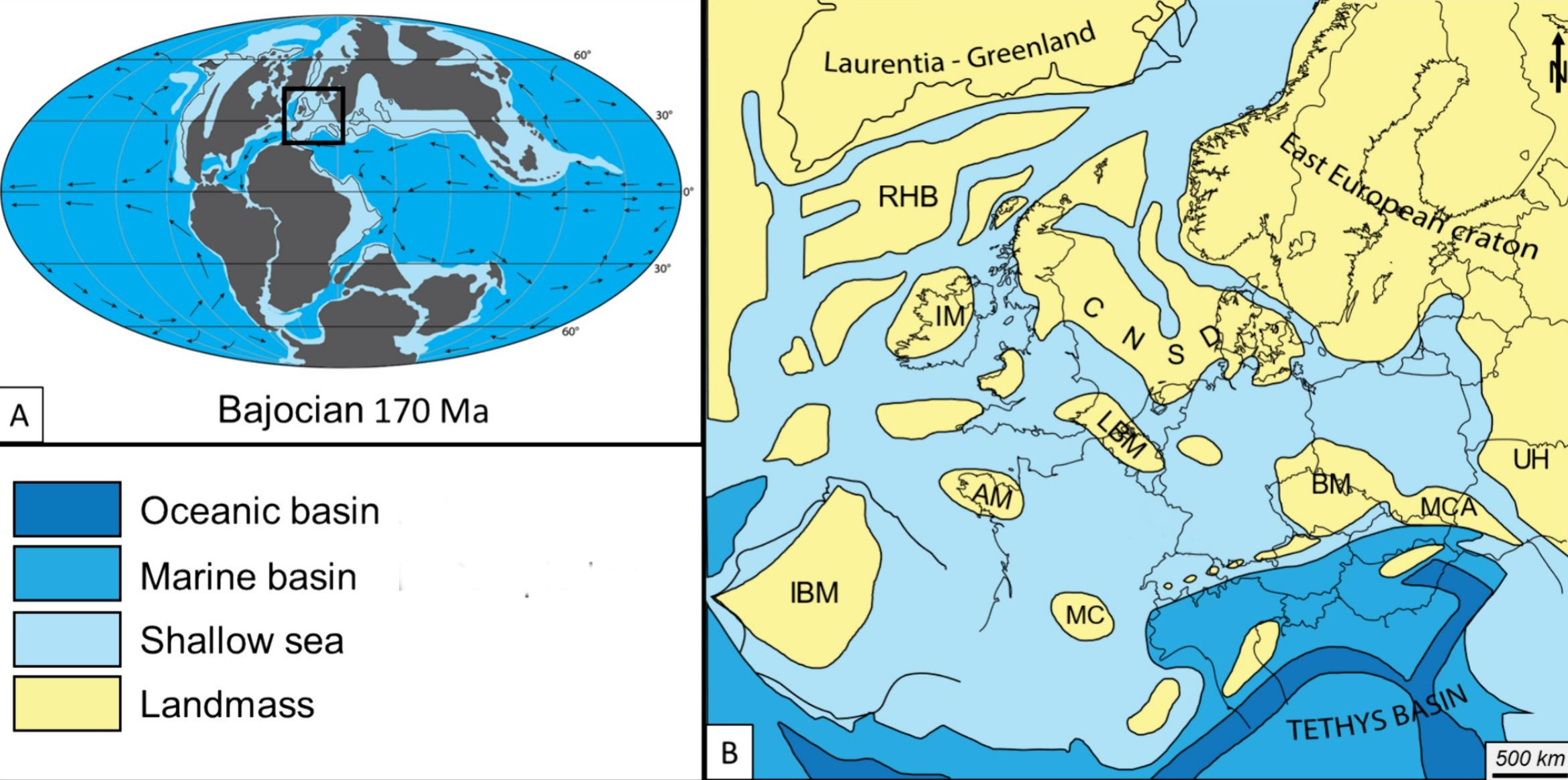
Map of Europe during the preceding Bajocian age, which had a broadly similar paleogeography to the Bathonian in which Proceratosaurus lived. The London-Brabant Massif is labelled "LBM", while CNSD stands for "Central North Sea Dome".

The only known Proceratosaurus specimen was found in rocks of the Great Oolite Group, which date to the late Bathonian age of the Middle Jurassic. The exact stratigraphic layer in which Proceratosaurus was discovered is unknown, but it is probably part of either the White Limestone Formation or the overlying Forest Marble Formation. The oolitic limestones in which Proceratosaurus was discovered are thought to have formed in very shallow marine conditions on the continental shelf.

During the Middle Jurassic, Britain was located in the subtropics, and along with the rest of Western Europe formed a part of an island archipelago, in a seaway narrowly separated from Laurentia (the landmass consisting of North America and Greenland) to the west and the Fennoscandian Shield to the northeast. Britain was divided into a number of islands separated by shallow seas, including one formed by the London–Brabant Massif to the east, the Welsh Massif to the west, the Cornubian Massif to the southwest, and the Pennine-Scottish Massif to the north. The Great Oolite Group was deposited in conditions varying from shallow marine to paralic (coastal). The coastlines of these islands fluctuated throughout the Bathonian, with areas of shallow marine deposition being sometimes temporarily transformed into lagoonal or terrestrial environments with lakes and ponds, and it has been suggested that animals were able to disperse between them and possibly the Fennoscandian Shield, with many terrestrial vertebrate species found in Bathonian deposits of the Great Oolite Group of England also found in the equivalently aged rocks of the Kilmaluag Formation of the Isle of Skye in northern Scotland.

The flora from the Bathonian-aged Taynton Limestone Formation in Oxfordshire (which is immediately east of Gloucestershire where Proceratosaurus was found) was dominated by araucarian and cheirolepidiacean conifers, the probable conifer Pelourdea, as well as bennettitaleans, with other plants including cycads (Ctenis), ferns (Phlebopteris, Coniopteris), Caytoniales, the living genus Ginkgo, and the seed ferns Pachypteris and Komlopteris, probably representing a seasonally dry coastal environment. In the White Limestone Formation, evidence of wildfires indicates the periodic occurrence of long periods of drought.

=== Contemporary fauna ===
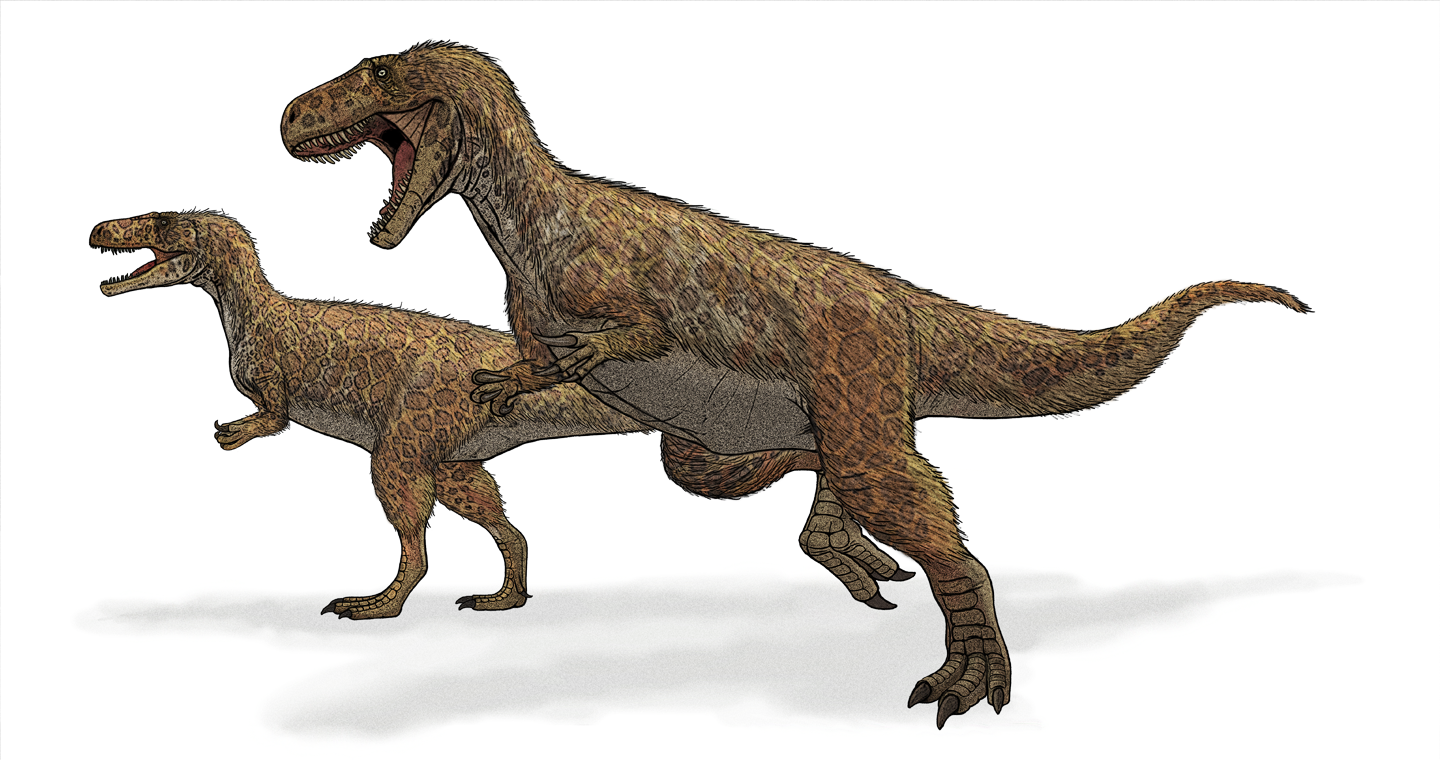
Restoration of Megalosaurus bucklandii, a large theropod also from the Great Oolite Group of England, which Proceratosaurus was once thought to be congeneric with

Other dinosaurs known from the Bathonian age in Britain include the large theropod Megalosaurus and the sauropod Cetiosaurus. Ornithischian remains have also been discovered, but none of these remains have been given scientific names. Bones and teeth of stegosaurs, as well as teeth of ankylosaurs, basal thyreophorans, and heterodontosaurids have been found, alongside remains that have not been confidently assigned to a single group. Maniraptoran theropods, possibly including dromaeosaurs, were also present in the environment, also only known from indeterminate teeth. Pterosaurs from the Great Oolite Group included rhamphorhynchids such as the genus Klobiodon, as well as probable monofenestratans. Large rhamphorhynchoids like Dearc and monofenestratans like Ceoptera are also known from other Bathonian aged localities in the British Isles. Crocodyliformes were also present in the environment, including atoposaurids and goniopholids.

The Great Oolite Group is also host to a diverse assemblage of small terrestrial vertebrates (microvertebrates), known from over a dozen localities across England. The most important locality, the Kirtlington Mammal Bed in Oxfordshire, deposited in swampy, coastal conditions at the boundary between the White Limestone and Forest Marble, preserves remains from large animals as well, but the majority are microvertebrates. These include primitive mammals and their close relatives, such as tritylodontid cynodonts, morganucodonts, docodonts, allotherians, haramiyidans, shuotheriids, eutriconodonts, and early-diverging cladotherians. Remains of amphibians, including salamanders, frogs and albanerpetontids as well as reptiles like turtles, lizards (among the world's oldest), choristoderes, and sphenodontians have also been discovered in the Kirtlington Mammal Bed.
