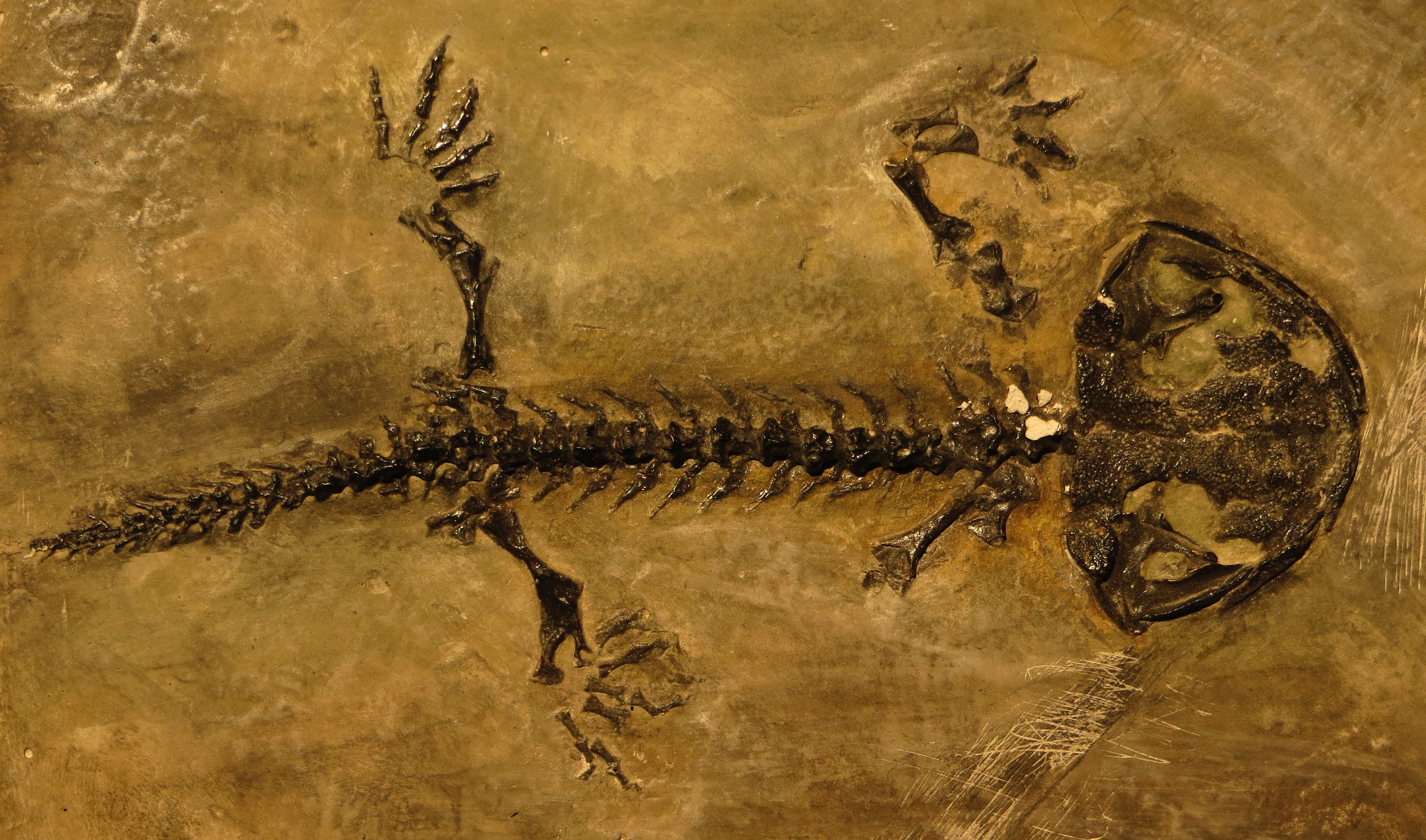
- Karaurus sharovi

Scientific classification
- Kingdom: Animalia
- Phylum: Chordata
- Class: Amphibia
- Clade: Caudata
- Family: †Karauridae; Ivachnenko, 1978

Genera
- Karaurus; Kokartus; Kuzbassia; Marmorerpeton

= Karauridae =

Karauridae Temporal range: Jurassic-Cretaceous Bathonian–Aptian

Extinct family of salamanders

The Karauridae are a family of stem-group salamanders (Caudata) that are known from the Middle Jurassic to Early Cretaceous in Central Asia (Kazakhstan and Kyrgyzstan), Northern Asia (Siberia, Russia) and Western Europe (United Kingdom). The family includes four members: Karaurus from the Middle-Late Jurassic Karabastau Formation of Kazakhstan, Kokartus from the Middle Jurassic Balabansai Formation of Kyrgyzstan, Marmorerpeton from the Middle Jurassic Forest Marble Formation of England and Kilmaluag Formation of Scotland, and Kuzbassia from the Early Cretaceous (Aptian) Ilek Formation (Kemerovo Oblast, Russia). The members are some of the oldest known salamanders. The family is united by several morphological characters, including sculptured skull roof bones, bicapitate ribs, and an irregular interparietal seam. Like some modern salamanders, karaurids were neotenic. Members of the family likely fed via suction feeding on small fish and invertebrates. The Early Cretaceous Siberian Kulgeriherpeton has been suggested to be a karaurid by some authors.

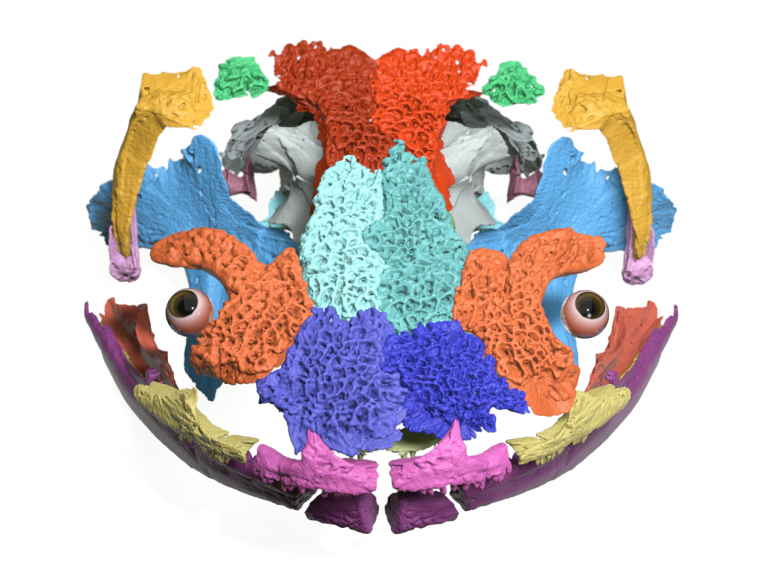
A digital 3D reconstruction of the skull of Marmorerpeton wakei based on X-ray CT data. They eyes were not preserved and are included to indicate where they would have been located
