= Forest Marble Formation =

Jurassic geological formation in England

- Stratigraphic range: Bathonian 168–164.7 Ma
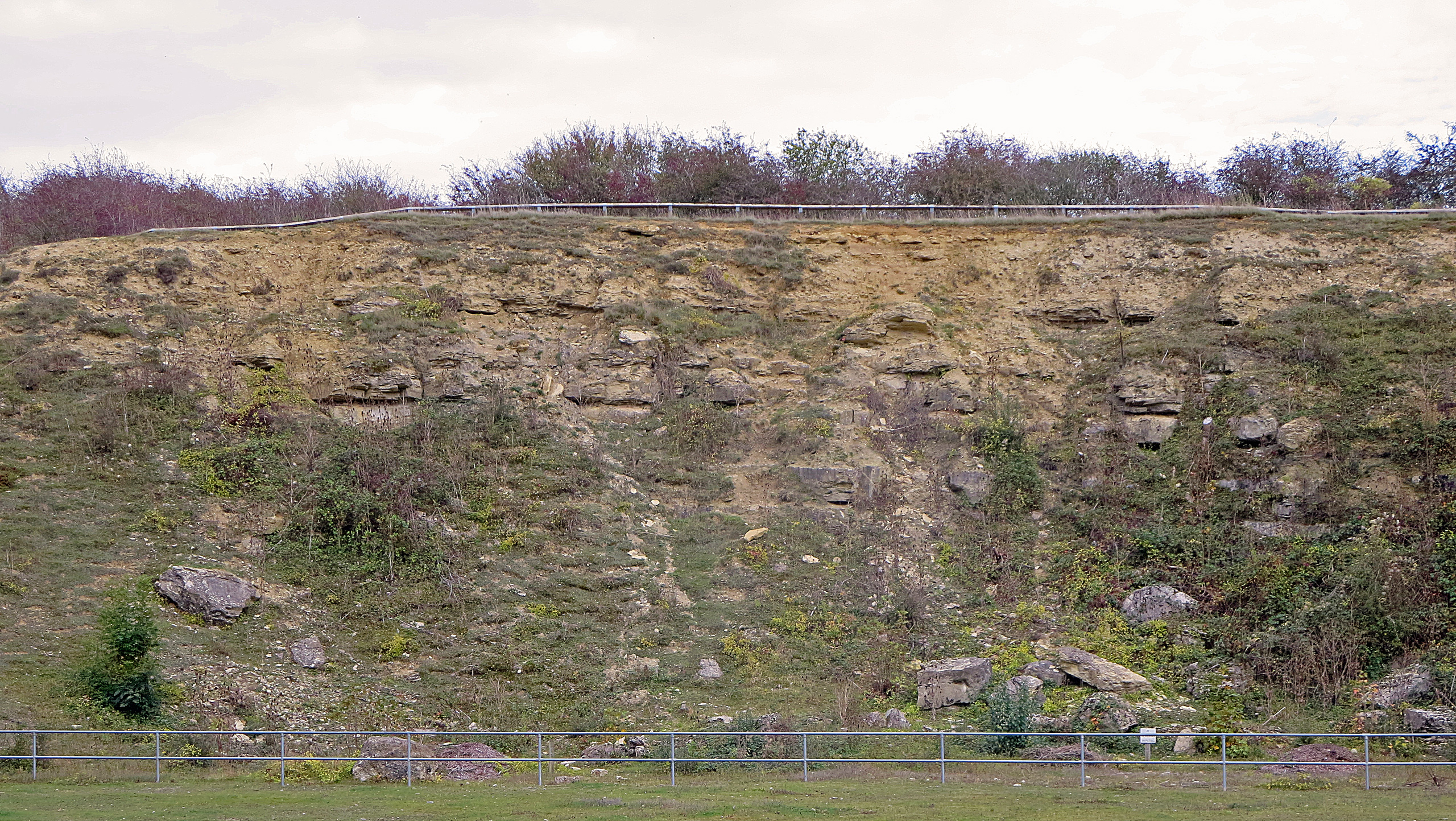
- Forest Marble Formation exposed in Kirtlington Quarry, Oxfordshire
- Type: Geological formation
- Unit of: Great Oolite Group
- Underlies: Cornbrash Formation
- Overlies: White Limestone Formation, Athelstan Oolite Formation, Chalfield Oolite Formation, Corsham Limestone Formation, Frome Clay
- Thickness: Up to 5m thick in Buckinghamshire, 10 to 30m in Oxfordshire and Gloucestershire, 30 to about 50m in north Dorset, 30 to 75m in south Dorset

Lithology
- Primary: Mudstone, Limestone
- Other: Siltstone, Sandstone

Location
- Region: Bedfordshire, Buckinghamshire, Oxfordshire, Dorset
- Country: United Kingdom

Type section
- Named for: Wychwood Forest

The Forest Marble is a geological formation in England. Part of the Great Oolite Group, it dates to the late Bathonian stage of the Middle Jurassic.

== Lithology ==
The primary lithology of the formation typically consists of greenish grey variably calcareous silicate mudstone, with lenticular cross bedded limestone units deposited in a marine setting.

== Paleobiota ==
Despite the formation being nearly entirely marine, at several localities abundant remains of terrestrial microvertebrates are found, the primary locality being the Kirtlington Mammal Bed (designated 3p) in Kirtlington Quarry near Kirtlington, Oxfordshire. Another important locality is Watton Cliff near Eype in Dorset.

=== Fish ===
Fish of the Forest Marble Formation
Genus	Species	Location	Stratigraphic position	Abundance	Notes	Images
Hybodus	Hybodus obtusus	Watton Cliff			A hybodont shark	
Egertonodus	Egertonodus duffini	Watton Cliff			A hybodont shark	
Secarodus	Secarodus polyprion	Watton Cliff			A hybodont shark	
Strophodus	Spp.				A hybodont shark, formerly considered to be Asteracanthus	
Lonchidion	Indeterminate				A hybodont shark	
Parvodus	Parvodus pattersoni				A hybodont shark	
Lissodus	Lissodus leiopleurus				A hybodont shark	
Palaeocarcharias?	Indeterminate				Possibly the oldest lamniform shark	

=== Dinosaurs ===
==== Ornithischians ====
Color key: Taxon / Reclassified taxon / Taxon falsely reported as present / Dubious taxon or junior synonym / Ichnotaxon / Ootaxon / Morphotaxon	Notes; Uncertain or tentative taxa are in small text; ~~crossed out~~ taxa are discredited.

Ornithischians of the Forest Marble Formation
Genus	Species	Location	Stratigraphic position	Abundance	Notes	Images
Alocodon	Indeterminate	Oxfordshire				
Hylaeosaurus	Indeterminate	Wiltshire			Dubious	
Iguanodon	Indeterminate	Oxfordshire			Dubious, probably indeterminate ornithischian	

==== Saurischians ====
Color key: Taxon / Reclassified taxon / Taxon falsely reported as present / Dubious taxon or junior synonym / Ichnotaxon / Ootaxon / Morphotaxon	Notes; Uncertain or tentative taxa are in small text; ~~crossed out~~ taxa are discredited.

Saurischians reported from the Forest Marble Formation
Genus	Species	Location	Stratigraphic position	Material	Notes	Images
Bothriospondylus	B. robustus	Wiltshire		"Dorsal vertebra."	Reassigned to Marmarospondylus	Cetiosaurus Proceratosaurus
Bothriospondylus	Indeterminate	Oxfordshire				Cetiosaurus Proceratosaurus
Cardiodon	C. rugulosus	Wiltshire			One tooth drawing	Cetiosaurus Proceratosaurus
Cetiosaurus	C. oxoniensis	Oxfordshire			A cetiosaurid sauropod.	Cetiosaurus Proceratosaurus
"Cetiosaurus"	C. glymptonensis	Oxfordshire		"Caudal vertebrae."	Actually indeterminate theropod remains.	Cetiosaurus Proceratosaurus
Dromaeosauridae	Indeterminate	Oxfordshire	Kirtlington Quarry	"Teeth"	Remains represent three species. Same species also present in the Chipping Norton Limestone. Other authors have questioned the attribution to dromaeosaurs.	Cetiosaurus Proceratosaurus
Marmarospondylus				Dorsal verebra	Dubious genus of sauropod	Cetiosaurus Proceratosaurus
Megalosaurus	M. bucklandii	Gloucestershire				Cetiosaurus Proceratosaurus
Megalosaurus	Indeterminate	Dorset; Oxfordshire			Actually indeterminate theropod remains.	Cetiosaurus Proceratosaurus
Proceratosaurus	P. bradleyi	Gloucestershire			A proceratosaurid theropod. The geological formation that this species comes from is disputed, and other authors have attributed the strata to the White Limestone Formation.	Cetiosaurus Proceratosaurus

=== Amphibians ===
Amphibians reported from the Forest Marble Formation
Genus	Species	Location	Stratigraphic position	Material	Notes	Images
Anoualerpeton	A. priscus	Kirtlington			Albanerpetontid	
"Eodiscoglossus"	"E." oxoniensis	Kirtlington			Frog, probably not closely related to type species of genus.	Eodiscoglossus
Marmorerpeton	M. kermacki, M. freemani	Kirtlington, Watton Cliff			Neotenic stem-group salamander (Caudata) belonging to Karauridae	Skull reconstruction of the closely related Marmorerpeton wakei
Caudata	Indeterminate	Kirtlington			2 distinct taxa, one common one small, referred to as Kirtlington Salamander A and B, respectively	

=== Turtles ===
Turtles reported from the Forest Marble Formation
Genus	Species	Location	Stratigraphic position	Material	Notes	Images
Paracryptodira	Indeterminate	Kirtlington		Shell fragments, basisphenoid		

=== Choristoderes ===
Choristoderes reported from the Forest Marble Formation
Genus	Species	Location	Stratigraphic position	Material	Notes	Images
Cteniogenys	Indeterminate	Kirtlington			A small, lizard like choristoderan. Oldest record of the group	

=== Pterosaurs ===
Choristoderes reported from the Forest Marble Formation
Genus	Species	Location	Stratigraphic position	Material	Notes	Images
"Rhamphorhynchoidea"	Indeteriminate	Kirtlington				

=== Lepidosauromorphs ===
Lepidosauromorphs reported from the Forest Marble Formation
Genus	Species	Location	Stratigraphic position	Material	Notes	Images
Balnealacerta	B. silvestris	Kirtlington			Scincomorph lizard	
Bellairsia	B. gracillis	Kirtlington			Squamate	
Eophis	E. underwoodi	Kirtlington			Stem-snake	
Marmoretta	M. oxoniensis	Kirtlington			Basal Lepidosauromorph	
Oxiella	O. tenuis	Kirtlington			Squamate	
Parviraptor	cf. estesi	Kirtlington			Stem-snake	
Saurillodon	S. marmorensis	Kirtlington			Paramacellodid lizard	
Rhynchocephalia	Indeterminate	Kirtlington				

=== Crocodyliformes ===
Crocodyliformes reported from the Forest Marble Formation
Genus	Species	Location	Stratigraphic position	Material	Notes	Images
cf. Goniopholis	Indeterminate	Kirtlington				Goniopholis
cf. Theriosuchus	Indeterminate	Kirtlington				

=== Mammaliamorphs ===
Mammaliamorphs reported from the Forest Marble Formation
Genus	Species	Location	Stratigraphic position	Material	Notes	Images
Amphitherium	Indeterminate	?Kirtlington, Watton Cliff			The first Mesozoic mammal to be described. Initially believed to be a marsupial. Close relative of Palaeoxonodon and Peramuridae.	
Borealestes	B. serendipitus	Kirtlington, Watton Cliff		molar fragments	Docodonta	
Dobunnodon	B. mussetti	Kirtlington		molar fragments	Docodonta	
Gobiconodon	G. bathoniensis	Kirtlington, Watton Cliff			Gobiconodontid	
Hahnotherium	H. antiquum	Kirtlington, Watton Cliff			Multituberculate	
Kermackodon	K. multicuspis, K. oxfordensis	Kirtlington, Watton Cliff			Allotherian belonging to the family Kermackodontidae, K. oxfordensis previously placed in separate genus Eleutherodon.	
Kirtlingtonia	K. catenata	Kirtlington			Haramiyid	
Krusatodon	K. kirtlingtonensis	Kirtlington			Tegotheriid docodontan	
Millsodon	M. superstes	Kirtlington, Watton Cliff			Haramiyid	
Morganucodon	M. tardus	Watton Cliff			Morganucodontidae	Morganucodon
Palaeoxonodon	P. ooliticus	Kirtlington, Watton Cliff			Amphitheriid	
Paritatodon	P. kermacki	Kirtlington			Docodontan or Shuotheriidae	
Peraiocynodon	P. major	Kirtlington			Docodontidae	
Phascolotherium	P. simpsoni	Kirtlington, Watton Cliff			Amphilestidae	
Simpsonodon	S. oxfordensis	Kirtlington			Docodonta	
Shuotherium	Indeterminate	Kirtington			Shuotheriidae	
Stereognathus	S. ooliticus	Kirtlington, Watton Cliff			Tritylodontidae	
Stylidens	S. hookeri	Watton Cliff			Morganucodontidae	
Wareolestes	W. rex	Kirtlington			Morganucodonta	
Allotheria	Indeterminate	Kirtlington				
Haramiyida	Indeterminate	Kirtlington				
Dryolestida	Indeterminate			Lower molars		
Peramuridae	Indeterminate	Watton Cliff				

== See also ==
- List of dinosaur-bearing rock formations
- Bradford Clay
