= White Limestone Formation =

Geological formation in England

- Stratigraphic range: Bathonian
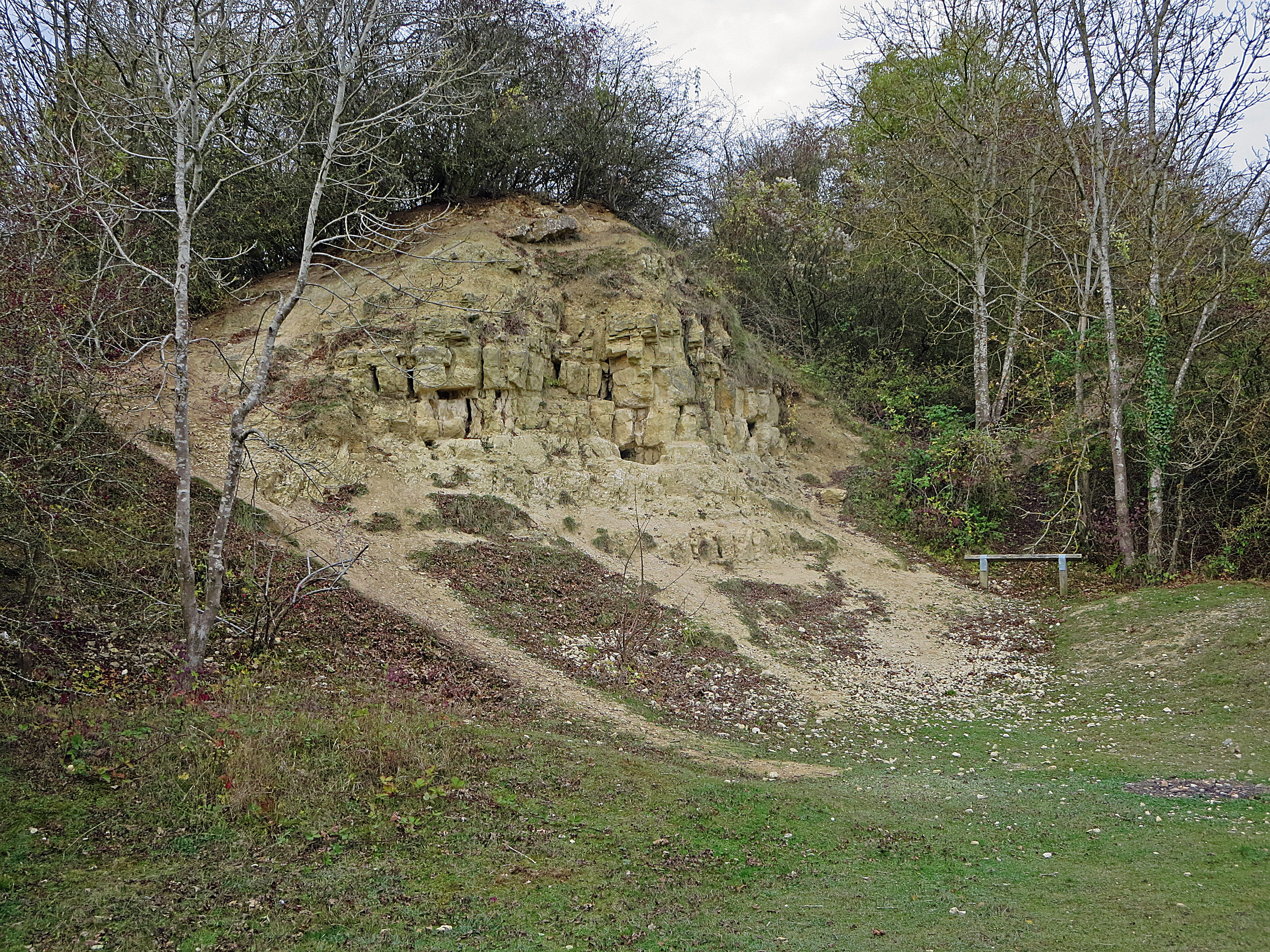
- White Limestone Formation exposed at Kirtlington Quarry
- Type: Geological formation
- Unit of: Great Oolite Group
- Sub-units: Shipton Member, Ardley Member, Bladon Member
- Underlies: Forest Marble Formation
- Overlies: Hampen Formation, Rutland Formation
- Thickness: Up to 30 m

Lithology
- Primary: Limestone
- Other: Mudstone Clay Marl

Location
- Region: England
- Country: United Kingdom
- Extent: Gloucestershire

Type section
- Location: Shipton-on-Cherwell Quarry
- Thickness at type section: Approximately 20 m

The White Limestone Formation is a Bathonian geologic formation in the United Kingdom, dating to the Middle Jurassic, 168.3 to 166.1 million years ago. Fossil sauropod tracks have been reported from the formation. It is the lateral equivalent of the Blisworth Limestone. It predominantly consists of grey-yellow limestone, typically wackestone and packstone with subordinate ooidal grainstone. The Woodeaton Quarry locality has yielded microvertebrates.

== Paleobiota ==
For the diverse terrestrial biota of the Kirtlington Mammal Bed, which is on the boundary between the White Limestone and the Forest Marble Formation, see Forest Marble Formation#Paleobiota

=== Dinosaurs ===
Dinosaurs reported from the White Limestone Formation
Genus	Species	Location	Stratigraphic position	Material	Notes	Images
Proceratosaurus	P. bradleyi	Minchinhampton		Partial skull and lower jaws	A proceratosaurid theropod, other authors have attributed the strata the specimen was found in to the Forest Marble Formation.	
Dromaeosauridae	Indeterminate	Woodeaton Quarry	Bed 26, Bladon Member	Teeth		
Thyreophora	Indeterminate	Woodeaton Quarry	Bed 26, Bladon Member	Teeth		
cf. Paronychodon	Indeterminate	Woodeaton Quarry	Bed 26, Bladon Member	Teeth		

=== Mammaliamorphs ===
Mammaliamorphs reported from the White Limestone Formation
Genus	Species	Location	Stratigraphic position	Material	Notes	Images
Amphitheriidae	Indeterminate	Woodeaton Quarry	Bed 26, Bladon Member	Tooth		
Phascolotherium	P. bucklandi	Woodeaton Quarry	Bed 26, Bladon Member	Tooth	Eutriconodont	
Hahnotherium	H. antiquum	Woodeaton Quarry	Bed 26, Bladon Member	Tooth	Multituberculata	
Simpsonodon	S. oxfordensis	Woodeaton Quarry	Bed 26, Bladon Member	Tooth	Docodont	
Woodeatonia	W. parva	Woodeaton Quarry	Bed 26, Bladon Member	Tooth	Allotherian	
Butlerodon	B. quadratus	Woodeaton Quarry	Bed 26, Bladon Member	Tooth	Allotherian	
Kermackodon	K. oxfordensis	Woodeaton Quarry	Bed 26, Bladon Member	Tooth	Allotherian, formerly placed in Eleutherodon	
Stereognathus	Indeterminate	Woodeaton Quarry	Bed 26, Bladon Member	Tooth	Tritylodontid	

== See also ==
- List of dinosaur-bearing rock formations
  - List of stratigraphic units with sauropodomorph tracks
    - Sauropod tracks
