= Neotonic Software =

Email software company

Neotonic Software Corporation
- Type: Subsidiary of Google since 2003.
- Genre: Customer Support
- Founded: 2001; 25 years ago
- Founder: David Jeske and Brandon Long
- Fate: acquired by Google in 2003
- Successor: Trax and Google Groups
- Headquarters: San Francisco, USA
- Key people: David Jeske and Brandon Long
- Products: Trakken and ClearSilver
- Owner: Google
- Parent: Google

Neotonic Software was a San Francisco based company that produced technology for email customer support, founded by David Jeske and Brandon Long in 2001. Google acquired the company in April 2003, bringing its Trakken CRM product in-house where it was still in use as recently as March 2009.

The company also developed the ClearSilver web templating language and the Archive email web archive. ClearSilver is open source and is used by several Google products and other projects such as Trac. The ideas behind Archive formed the basis for Google Groups.

Prior to Neotonic Software, David Jeske and Brandon Long worked together at eGroups and at Yahoo on Yahoo! Groups. Both also attended the University of Illinois.
