= Kokartus =

Kokartus Temporal range: Middle Jurassic, Bathonian–Callovian

Scientific classification
- Kingdom: Animalia
- Phylum: Chordata
- Class: Amphibia
- Family: †Karauridae
- Genus: †Kokartus; Nessov, 1988
- Species: †K. honorarius

Binomial name
- †Kokartus honorarius Nessov, 1988

Extinct genus of salamanders

Kokartus is an extinct genus of prehistoric stem-group salamander (Caudata) from the Middle Jurassic Balabansai Formation of Kyrgyzstan.

The absence of clear lines of arrested growth and annuli in long bones suggests that the animals lived in an environment with stable local conditions. Like other members of Karauridae, it is thought to have been neotenic. Kokartus is thought to have fed using suction feeding via the enlargement of the buccal cavity on small fish and invertebrates, with the well developed palatal dentition (teeth on the roof of the mouth) and marginal teeth helping to grasp prey.

== See also ==
- Prehistoric amphibian
- List of prehistoric amphibians
