= Kirtlington Quarry =

Quarry in Oxfordshire, England

Coordinates: 51.875°N 1.284°W

- Site of Special Scientific Interest
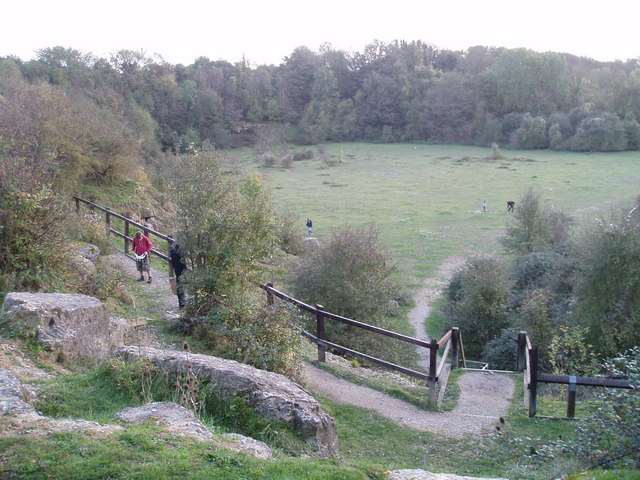
- Location of Kirtlington Quarry.
- Area of search: Oxfordshire
- Grid reference: SP 494 199
- Interest: Geological
- Area: 3.1 hectares (7.7 acres)
- Notification date: 1986
- Location map: Magic Map

Kirtlington Quarry is a 3.1-hectare (7.7-acre) former quarry and geological Site of Special Scientific Interest west of Kirtlington in Oxfordshire. It is a Geological Conservation Review site, and it is part of the 7.4-hectare (18-acre) Kirtlington Quarry Local Nature Reserve.

Kirtlington Quarry is one of the most important Middle Jurassic vertebrate localities in the world. It dates to the Upper Bathonian, around 166 million years ago, and is part of the Forest Marble Formation. Numerous species of extinct mammals have been found. There are also fossils of theropod dinosaurs, crocodilians, pterosaurs, fishes and many shark teeth (a detailed list can be found at Forest Marble Formation#Paleobiota).

== Land ownership ==
All land within Kirtlington Quarry SSSI is owned by the local authority
